= Paul Wynnyk =

Canadian general

Paul Wynnyk CMM MSM CD
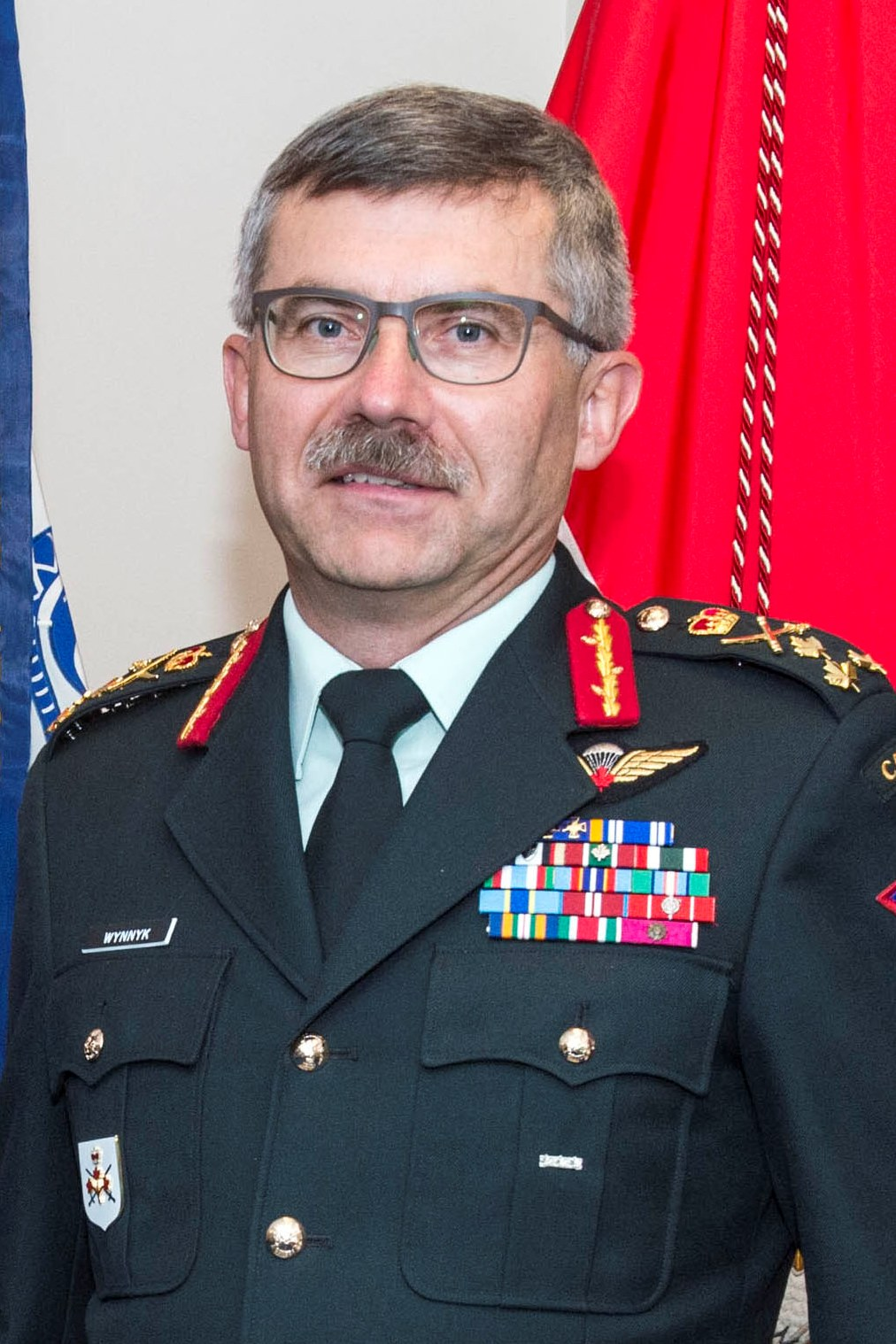

Acting Deputy Minister of Executive Council
- In office November 2024 – February 2025
- Premier: Danielle Smith
- Preceded by: Ray Gilmour
- Succeeded by: Christopher McPherson

Deputy Minister of Executive Council, Intergovernmental Relations
- In office June 2023 – November 2024
- Premier: Danielle Smith
- Preceded by: Coleen Volk
- Succeeded by: Mary MacDonald

Deputy Minister of Health
- In office May 2021 – June 2023
- Minister: Tyler Shandro; Jason Copping; Adriana LaGrange
- Preceded by: Janet Davidson
- Succeeded by: Andre Tremblay

Deputy Minister of Municipal Affairs
- In office October 2019 – May 2021
- Minister: Kaycee Madu; Tracy Allard; Ric McIver
- Preceded by: Brad Pickering
- Succeeded by: Brandy Cox

Personal details
- Born: June 29, 1964 (age 62)
- Children: 2
- Awards: Commander of the Order of Military Merit; Meritorious Service Medal; Canadian Forces' Decoration

Military service
- Allegiance: Canada
- Branch/service: Canadian Army
- Rank: Lieutenant General
- Commands: 1 Combat Engineer Regiment; 1 Area Support Group; Land Force Western Area; Canadian Forces Intelligence Command; Commander of the Canadian Army; Vice Chief of the Defence Staff
- Battles/wars: War in Afghanistan

Lieutenant General Paul Francis Wynnyk, CMM, MSM, CD (born June 29, 1964) is a former Canadian Army officer who served from 2016 to 2018 as Commander of the Canadian Army. On July 16, 2018, he was named Vice Chief of the Defence Staff, until his resignation and retirement in July 2019.

== Personal life ==
Paul Wynnyk is of Ukrainian descent, the grandson of emigrants in Alberta from Radvantsi, Lviv region, in Western Ukraine. He was born in Edmonton on June 29, 1964, and was raised in the village of Breton, Alberta.

He's married to Marianne and has two sons. His late father, Walter Wynnyk, served as both his high-school principal and the commanding officer of his army cadet corps unit.

== Military career ==
Wynnyk attended Royal Roads Military College and the Royal Military College of Canada, and he was commissioned into the Canadian Military Engineers in 1986. He became commanding officer of 1 Combat Engineer Regiment in Edmonton in 1997, commander of 1 Area Support Group in 2004 and Assistant Commanding General at the Combined Security Transition Command – Afghanistan in March 2009. He went on to be commander of Land Force Western Area in 2010, Deputy Commander of the Canadian Army in 2012 and Commander of the Canadian Forces Intelligence Command and Chief of Defence Intelligence in July 2014.

In January 2016, it was announced that he would become Chief of the Army Staff and Commander of the Canadian Army. In his speech during the ceremony, Wynnyk gave credit to his parents for supporting him on the path to this point in his career. "My mom Joan, who is here today, has watched and supported my journey in uniform from cub scout, to army cadet, to reservist, to regular officer," he said. About his late father Walter, Wynnyk said, "As both my high school principal and the commanding officer of my army cadet corps, it was he who encouraged me to embark upon a career of military service. On July 16, 2018, he was named Vice Chief of the Defence Staff.

In July 2019, Wynnyk resigned as Vice Chief of the Defence Staff after he claimed that Chief of the Defence Staff General Jonathan Vance planned to replace him as the Vice-Chief of the Defence Staff with Vice-Admiral Mark Norman. Wynnyk then claimed these plans were reversed when Vice-Admiral Norman settled with the government and retired from the military. Wynnyk was the fifth vice-chief to serve under Vance.

== Post-military career ==
In October 2019, Wynnyk was appointed as Deputy Minister of Municipal Affairs for the Government of Alberta and became Deputy Minister of Health in 2021.

== Awards and decorations ==
Wynnyk's personal awards and decorations include the following:

Ribbon	Description	Notes
	Order of Military Merit (CMM)	Appointed Commander (CMM) on 26 September 2013; Appointed Officer (OMM) on 21 September 2006
	Meritorious Service Medal (MSM)	Decoration awarded on 26 April 2011; Military division
	South-West Asia Service Medal	with AFGHANISTAN Clasp
	General Campaign Star	South West Asia Ribbon; 1 Rotation Bars
	Special Service Medal	with NATO-OTAN Clasp
	Canadian Peacekeeping Service Medal	
	United Nations	Advance Mission in Cambodia Medal: UNAMIC
	United Nations	Transitional Authority in Cambodia Medal: UNTAC
	United Nations	Mission in the Democratic Republic of the Congo Medal: MONUC / MONUSCO
	Queen Elizabeth II Diamond Jubilee Medal	Decoration awarded in 2012; Canadian version
	King Charles III Coronation Medal	
	Canadian Forces' Decoration (CD)	with two Clasp for 32 years of services
	Alberta Centennial Medal	Decoration awarded in 2005
	Queen Elizabeth II Platinum Jubilee Medal	
	Order of Military Merit (Brazil)	Decoration awarded 28 July 2018; Grand Officer level; Federative Republic of Brazil award
	Order of Military Merit José María Córdova	Decoration awarded 29 September 2018; Grand Cross level; Republic of Colombia award
	Baryaal Darajaah Uak Medal	Decoration awarded 4 February 2011; Successful 1st Grade; Islamic Republic of Afghanistan award
	Legion of Merit	Decoration awarded 28 May 2011; Officer level; United States award
	Chief of Defence Staff Commendation	

He was a qualified Paratrooper and as such wore the Canadian Forces Jump Wings with Red Maple Leaf

Military offices
Preceded by Marquis Hainse	Commander of the Canadian Army; 2016–2018	Succeeded by Jean-Marc Lanthier
Preceded by Mark Norman	Vice Chief of the Defence Staff; 2018–2019	Succeeded by Jean-Marc Lanthier
