= Michael Rouleau =

Canadian Army general officer

Michael Norman Rouleau
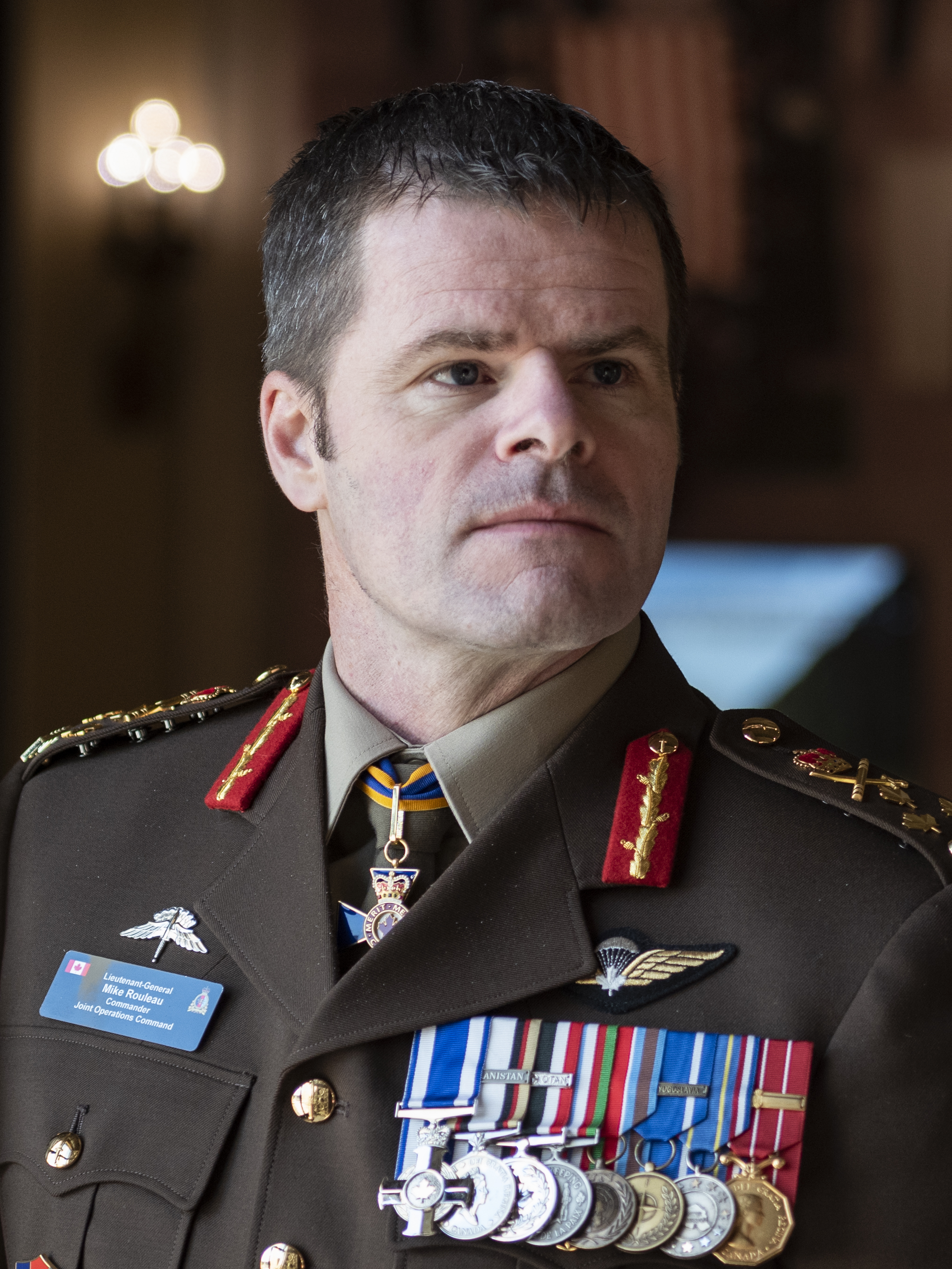
- Lieutenant-General Michael Rouleau
- Born: July 4, 1967 (age 59)
- Military career
- Allegiance: Canada
- Branch: Canadian SOF Command
- Service years: 1985–1999; 2002–2022
- Rank: Lieutenant-General
- Commands: Strategic Advisor to the Chief of Defence Staff; Vice Chief of the Defence Staff; Joint Operations Command
- Conflicts: War in Afghanistan (2001–2021); Bosnian War
- Awards: Commander of the Order of Military Merit; Meritorious Service Cross; Canadian Forces' Decoration; Governor General’s Commendation

Lieutenant-General (R) Michael Norman Rouleau CMM MSC CD (born July 4, 1967) is a retired Canadian Forces officer who served as a lieutenant-general in Canadian Special Operations Forces Command. He was the vice chief of the Defence Staff from July 15, 2020, until June 14, 2021.

== Education ==
Rouleau obtained a Bachelor of Arts degree in Political Science from the University of Manitoba. He would later graduate from the Royal Military College of Canada with a Masters in Defence Studies and a Master of Arts Degree in Security, Management, and Defence Policy.

== Military career ==
Rouleau joined the Canadian Armed Forces (CAF) in 1985 as an artillery officer.

In 1994 he became a Special Operation Assaulter with Joint Task Force 2 (JTF2)

In 1999, he retired from the CAF and joined the ranks of the Ottawa Carleton Regional Police Service as an emergency response officer. However, he re-enrolled in the CAF in 2002 following the events of the September 11 attacks against the United States. Rouleau was appointed Commander of Canadian Special Operations Forces Command in February 2014. He was Commander of Canadian Joint Operations Command from June 2018 to March 2020 before being replaced by Lieutenant-General Christopher J. Coates.

In July 2020, Rouleau was named Vice Chief of the Defence Staff. In March 2021, Frances J. Allen was announced as his successor and he was named a strategic advisor to the chief of the Defence Staff on future capabilities, pending Allen's completion of service as Canada's Representative to the NATO Military Committee. He resigned prematurely from the role on June 14, 2021, after controversy over a golf game he played with former Chief of the Defence Staff Jonathan Vance during an investigation into the latter for sexual misconduct.

== Honours and decorations ==
Rouleau has received the following orders and decorations during his military career:

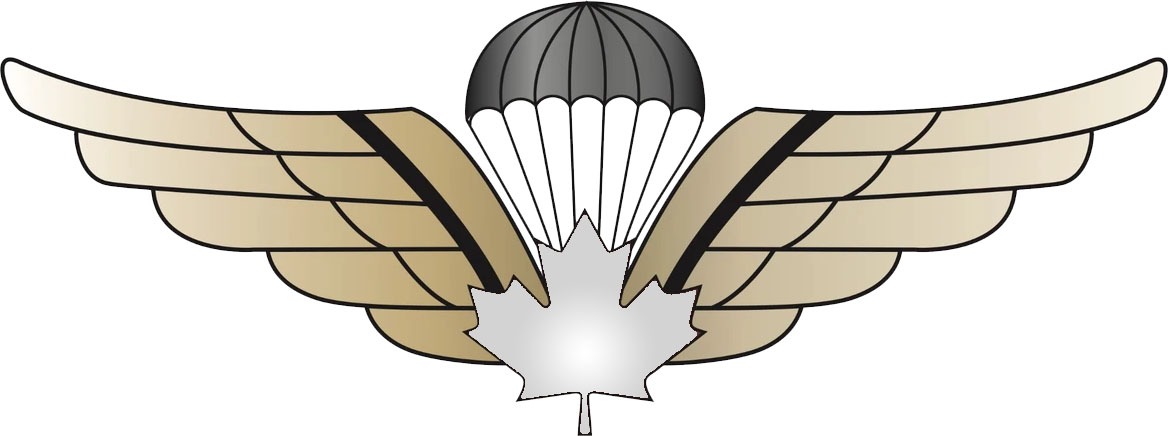

Ribbon	Description	Notes
	Order of Military Merit (CMM)	Appointed Commander (CMM) on 29 June 2018; Appointed Officer (OMM) on 7 November 2014
	Meritorious Service Cross (MSC)	
	South-West Asia Service Medal	with AFGHANISTAN Clasp and Rotation bar
	Special Service Medal	with NATO-OTAN Clasp
	Canadian Peacekeeping Service Medal	
	UNPROFOR	
	NATO Medal for the former Yugoslavia	with FORMER YUGOSLAVIA clasp
	European Community Monitor Mission Medal (Yugoslavia)	
	Canadian Forces' Decoration (CD)	with two Clasp for 32 years of services

Military offices
Preceded by Jean-Marc Lanthier	Vice Chief of the Defence Staff; 2020–2021	Succeeded by Frances J. Allen
