= Peter Devlin (general) =

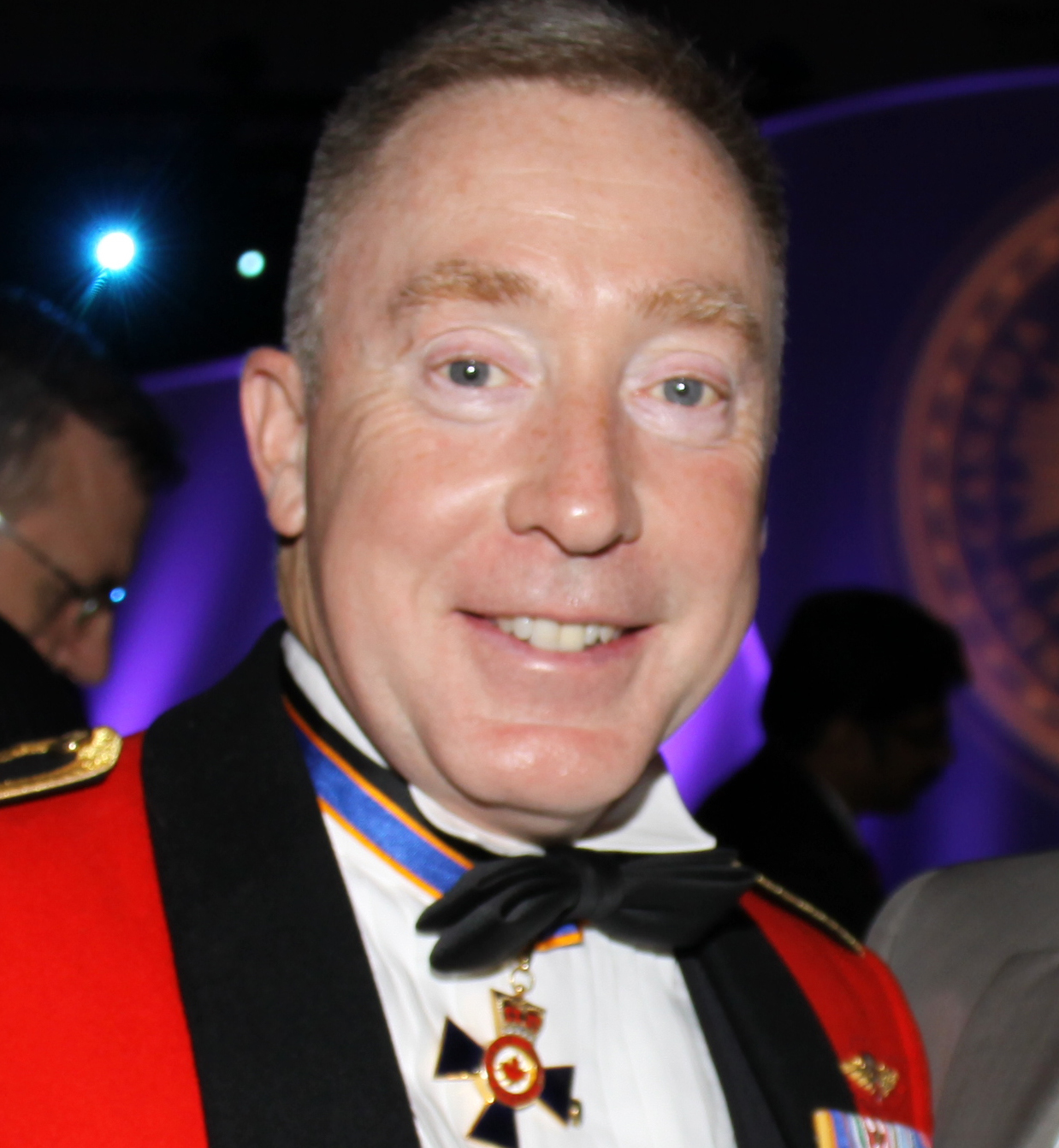
- Devlin in 2019
- Military career
- Allegiance: Canada
- Branch: Canadian Army
- Rank: Lieutenant General
- Commands: 1st Bn The Royal Canadian Regiment; 2 Canadian Mechanized Brigade Group; Kabul Multinational Brigade in Afghanistan; Canadian Army
- Conflicts: Bosnian War; War in Afghanistan; Iraq War
- Awards: Commander of the Order of Military Merit; Meritorious Service Cross; Canadian Forces' Decoration

Lieutenant General Peter John Devlin CMM MSC CD was a senior officer in the Canadian Army and is currently President of Fanshawe College. He served as Commander of the Canadian Army from 2010 to 2013.

== Personal life ==
Devlin is married to his wife, Judy, is a native of London, Ontario. The couple has four children.

On 8 June 2013, it was announced that Devlin would be the 5th President of Fanshawe College in London, Canada. His appointment was effective as of 9 February 2013.

== Military career ==
Educated at the University of Western Ontario, Devlin was commissioned into The Royal Canadian Regiment, having joined the Canadian Forces in 1978. Devlin served in an operational role in Cyprus between 1984 and 1985 and in the Former Yugoslavia in 1992, 1996 and 1998. In 1994, following his experiences in the Former Yugoslavia, Devlin published a report which was critical of the fact that the international community "had no International Peacekeeping Training Centre".

He was appointed commanding officer of 1st Battalion of The Royal Canadian Regiment in 1997. Then, in 1998, he was the Canadian Battle Group commanding officer in Bosnia.

He became commander of 2 Canadian Mechanized Brigade Group in 2002.

He served with the International Security Assistance Force as commander of the Kabul Multinational Brigade in Afghanistan from 2003 to 2004.

He was appointed deputy commanding general of III (US) Corps and Fort Hood, Texas in 2005 and deployed with the corps to Iraq. He was deputy commanding general of the Multi-National Corps – Iraq from 2006 to 2008 – in that capacity he told the Washington Post that the Multi-National Force was giving "greater legitimacy to the effort here in Iraq.". In 2008 he was made deputy commander of the Canadian Expeditionary Force Command.

In March 2010, it was announced that Devlin would be appointed Chief of the Land Staff within the year. The change of command took place on 21 June 2010.

On 6 February 2013, Devlin announced he would be retiring from the service with Lieutenant-general Marquis Hainse to be his replacement.

On 18 October 2024, Devlin was appointed colonel of The Royal Canadian Regiment during a formal ceremony at Garrison Petawawa, Ontario.

== Honours ==

| Ribbon | Description | Notes |
| | Order of Military Merit (CMM) | Commander 18 February 2011; Officer 29 May 1998 |
| | Meritorious Service Cross (MSC) | Military Division; 26 November 2004 |
| | General Campaign Star | South West Asia |
| | General Campaign Star | EXPEDITION; 2 Additional Tour Bars (For Iraq) |
| | Special Service Medal | With "NATO-OTAN" Clasp |
| | Canadian Peacekeeping Service Medal | 30 Days Service on a Peacekeeping Mission outside of Canada |
| | UN Medal | UNFICYP; 90 Days Service on United Nations Mission in Cyprus |
| | United Nations Medal | UNPROFOR; 90 Days Service on United Nations Mission During the Yugoslav Wars |
| NATO medal for the former Yugoslavia | NATO Medal | With "FORMER YUGOSLAVIA" Clasp; 30 Days Service on NATO Mission; With Rotation Numeral "2" |
| | Queen Elizabeth II Diamond Jubilee Medal | 2012; Canadian Version of this Medal |
| | Canadian Forces' Decoration (CD) | With 2 Clasps for 32 years service in the Canadian Army |
| | Legion of Merit | Degree of Officer; 25 October 2008; 2nd Award 04 December 2010; (United States) |
| | Legion of Honour | Degree of Officer; 19 February 2015; (France) |
| | Order of Military Merit | Grand Officer; 25 October 2012; (Brazil) |
| | Order of Military Merit José María Córdova | Grand Officer; 19 August 2013; Also Awarded the Faith in the Cause Military Medal; 25 October 2012; (Colombia) |

- He also wore the Canadian Forces Jump Wings With Red Maple Leaf.

Military offices
| Preceded by Andrew Leslie | Chief of the Land Staff (Retitled Commander of the Canadian Army from 2011); 2010–2013 | Succeeded by Marquis Hainse |
