= Mark Norman (Canadian naval officer) =

Canadian military officer

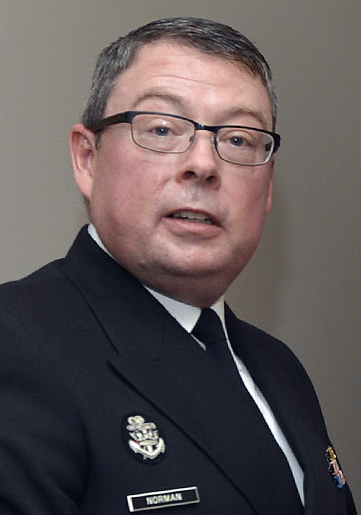
- Norman in 2015
- Born: 1963 or 1964 (age 62–63)
- Military career
- Allegiance: Canada
- Branch: Royal Canadian Navy (Note: Known as Canadian Forces Maritime Command until 2011)
- Service years: 1980–2019
- Rank: Vice-Admiral
- Commands: HMCS St. John's; Maritime Forces Atlantic
- Awards: Commander of the Order of Military Merit; Canadian Forces' Decoration; U.S. Legion of Merit (Commander)

Vice-Admiral (Ret'd) Mark A. G. Norman, CMM, CD (born 1963 or 1964) is a retired Royal Canadian Navy officer. He took up the post of Vice Chief of the Defence Staff of Canada on August 5, 2016. He was temporarily relieved of the post on January 16, 2017, and was permanently removed on June 27, 2018, accused of having released sensitive government information to affect a procurement of naval supply ships, which potentially constituted a breach of trust. In 2019, charges against him were dropped by the Crown because there was "no reasonable prospect of conviction." Norman subsequently received an "all-party" apology from the House of Commons, a settlement of claims, and full reimbursement of legal fees incurred by him.

== Early life ==
Norman was raised in Kingston, Ontario, the son of Major-General Francis John Norman, a former Commandant of the Royal Military College of Canada (1982–1985).

== Naval career ==
Educated at Queen's University, Norman joined the Naval Reserve in 1980 as a diesel mechanic with HMCS Cataraqui before transferring to the regular force in 1985 as a sub-lieutenant. He then joined the frigate HMCS Halifax before advancing to the post of executive officer of the destroyer HMCS Iroquois. He was then promoted to commanding officer of the frigate HMCS St. John's.

Norman was assigned to a series of posts ashore. He went on to be Assistant Chief of Transformation in 2005, Director General Strategy, Chief Force Development in 2007 and Commander, Canadian Fleet – Atlantic in 2009. He then became Director General of Maritime Force Development in 2010, and Assistant Chief of the Naval Staff and Deputy Commander of the Royal Canadian Navy in June 2011, before becoming Commander of the Royal Canadian Navy and Chief of the Naval Staff in June 2013.

In January 2016, it was announced that he was to be appointed Vice Chief of the Defence Staff of the Canadian Armed Forces, assuming the position on August 5. His successor as Commander of the Royal Canadian Navy was Rear-Admiral Ron Lloyd.

=== Removal from command ===
On January 13, 2017, Norman was temporarily relieved of his post as Vice Chief of Defence Staff by General Jonathan Vance, Chief of the Defence Staff. The removal was connected with an investigation into whether Norman had leaked sensitive documents relating to the procurement of an interim supply ship for the Royal Canadian Navy. Norman was replaced on a temporary basis by Vice-Admiral Ron Lloyd, the commander of the Navy.

On March 9, 2018, Norman was charged with one count of breach of trust by a public officer. He was permanently removed from his post on June 27, 2018. Even before Norman was formally charged, Prime Minister Justin Trudeau twice publicly predicted that the case would end up in court.

On May 8, 2019, Crown prosecutors stayed the charges against Vice-Admiral Norman. Crown prosecutor Barbara Mercier informed the presiding judge that there was "no reasonable prospect of conviction", adding that, while Norman's actions had been inappropriate, "inappropriate doesn’t mean criminal".

Defence Minister Harjit Sajjan said that the Federal government would pay the legal fees Norman had incurred.

=== Apology, retirement and settlement ===
The House of Commons issued an "all-party" apology to Norman on May 14, 2019.

News reports in late June 2019 stated that the Department of National Defence and Norman had concluded "a mutually acceptable agreement ... for which details will remain confidential". Norman refused to discuss the terms of the settlement and his retirement, although he had said in May 2019 that he had "an important story to tell that Canadians will want and need to hear". Whether a confidentially agreement had been signed was also to remain confidential. Other reports indicated that Norman has started making arrangements to reimburse donors who had contributed to his defence fund.

Norman's GoFundMe page had gathered from 3,547 people a total of $442,810. Justin Trudeau "twice publicly mused" that Norman "would see the inside of a courtroom", and this was all "before any criminal charge was laid" against him. As one pundit opined, the stakes were high: the "federal government’s mission [was] to destroy not only your exemplary military career, but also to ruin you financially and taint the remainder of your life with a criminal record." Norman's lawyers had said that then-President of the Treasury Board, Scott Brison, who resigned from political life in February 2019, had "tried to have the (Davie Shipbuilding) deal killed on behalf of the Irving family – who operate rival Irving Shipbuilding."

It was disclosed in January 2020 in response to a written question by the Member of Parliament Erin O'Toole that the failed prosecution of Norman had cost the taxpayer $1.4 million.

== Awards and decorations ==
Norman's personal awards and decorations included the following:

Ribbon	Description	Notes
	Order of Military Merit (CMM)	Appointed Commander (CMM), 17 October 2012
	Special Service Medal	NATO-OTAN clasp
	Canadian Peacekeeping Service Medal	
	NATO Medal for the former Yugoslavia	FORMER YUGOSLAVIA clasp
	Queen Elizabeth Diamond Jubilee Medal	Awarded 2012; Canadian version
	King Charles III Coronation Medal	
	Canadian Forces' Decoration (CD)	Two clasps, 32 years of service
	Queen Elizabeth II Platinum Jubilee Medal	
	Commander of the Legion of Merit	Awarded 21 April 2015, Commander level, United States
	Chief of Defence Staff Commendation	

== Notes ==
Military offices
Preceded by Paul Maddison	Commander of the Royal Canadian Navy; 2013–2016	Succeeded by Ron Lloyd
Preceded by Guy Thibault	Vice Chief of the Defence Staff; 2016–2018	Succeeded by Paul Wynnyk
