= Angus Topshee =

Royal Canadian Navy officer

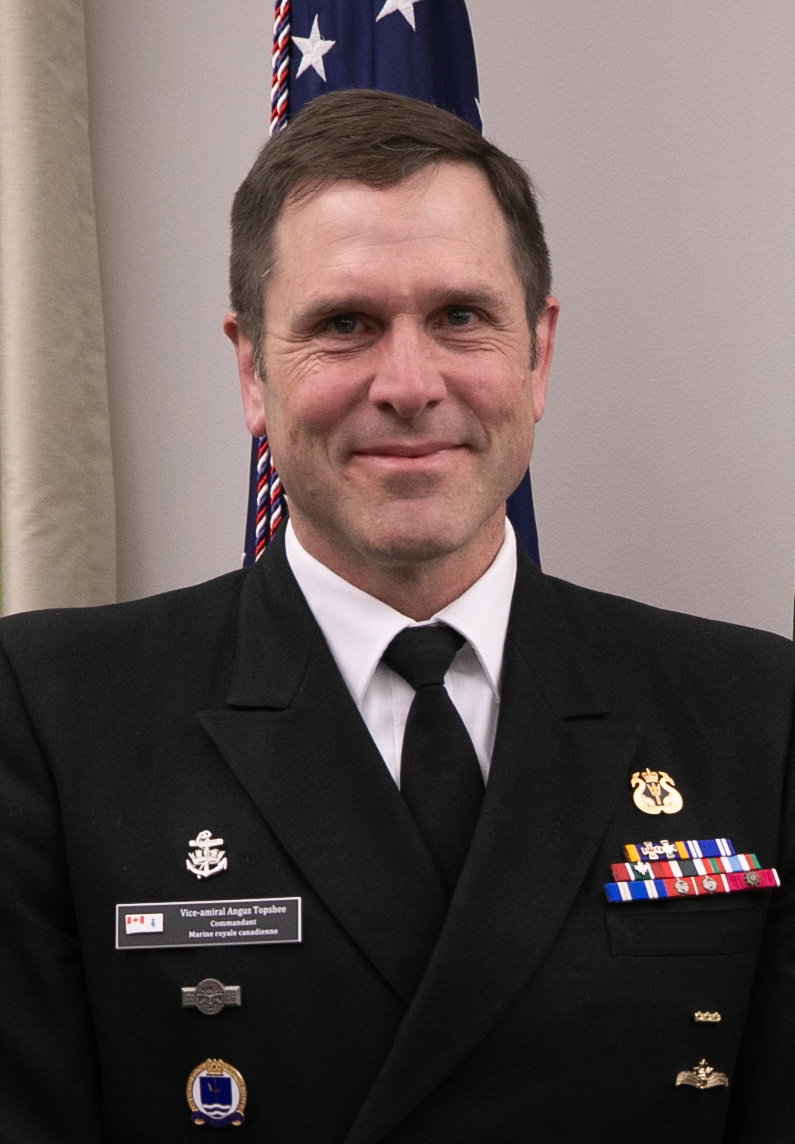
- Topshee in 2024
- Military career
- Allegiance: Canada
- Branch: Royal Canadian Navy (Note: Known as Canadian Forces Maritime Command until 2011)
- Service years: 1990–present
- Rank: Vice-Admiral
- Commands: Royal Canadian Navy; Maritime Forces Pacific; CFB Halifax; HMCS Algonquin
- Conflicts: War in Afghanistan
- Awards: Commander of the Order of Military Merit; Meritorious Service Medal; Canadian Forces' Decoration; Officer of the Legion of Merit (United States)

Vice-Admiral Angus Topshee, CMM, MSM, CD is a Royal Canadian Navy officer. He is currently Vice-Chief of Canada's Defence Staff and previously served as Commander of the Royal Canadian Navy between 30 May 2022 and 13 May 2026.

== Naval career ==
Topshee joined the Canadian Armed Forces in 1990 and graduated from the Royal Military College of Canada in 1994. He was given command of a destroyer, HMCS Algonquin, in July 2009 and was then deployed to Afghanistan as Director of Afghan National Police Training Operations in 2011.

Topshee went on to be Director of Operations for Exercise RIMPAC in 2012 and the commander of CFB Halifax in late 2012. He was awarded the Meritorious Service Medal on 19 December 2013. He became deputy director of the Strategy, Policy and Plans Directorate at North American Aerospace Defense Command in 2015 and was appointed as an Officer of the Order of Military Merit on 12 October 2017. He then became commander of the Canadian Fleet Pacific in July 2018, commander of Maritime Forces Pacific in May 2021 and Commander of the Royal Canadian Navy in May 2022.

On 13 May 2026, Topshee was named Vice-Chief of Canada's Defence Staff. Rear Admiral Dan Charlebois was named Commander of the Royal Canadian Navy as his replacement.

== Awards and decorations ==
Topshee's has received the following personal awards and decorations across his military career:

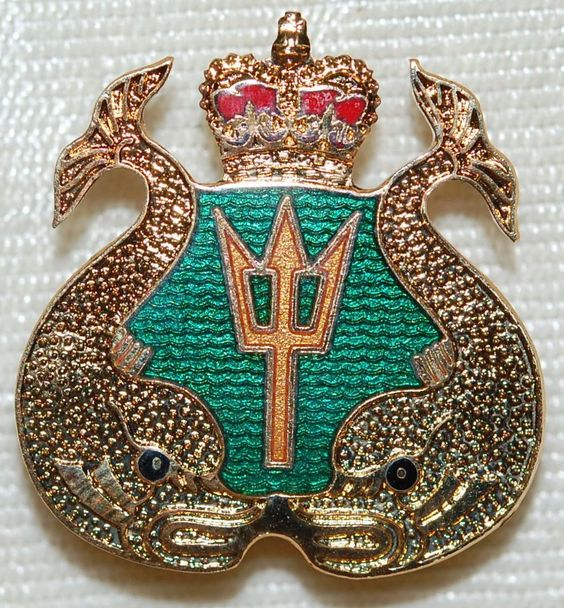

| Ribbon | Description | Notes |
| width=80 | Order of Military Merit (CMM) | Appointed Commander (CMM) on 12 May 2023; Appointed officer (OMM) on 27 May 2019 |
| | Meritorious Service Medal (MSM) | Decoration awarded on 19 December 2013; Military division |
| | General Campaign Star | South West Asia Ribbon; 1 Rotation Bars |
| | Special Service Medal | with NATO-OTAN Clasp |
| | Canadian Peacekeeping Service Medal | |
| | NATO Medal | with Non Article 5 Clasp |
| | Canadian Forces' Decoration (CD) | with two Clasp for 32 years of services |
| | Legion of Merit | Decoration awarded on 29 Jun 2019; Officer level; (United States) |

CDS Commendation (21 October 2013)

== Notes ==
Military offices
| Preceded by Craig Baines | Commander of the Royal Canadian Navy; 2022–2026 | Succeeded by Dan Charlebois |
| Preceded by Stephen Kelsey | Vice Chief of the Defence Staff; 2026–present | Incumbent |
