= Stephen Kelsey =

Canadian general officer

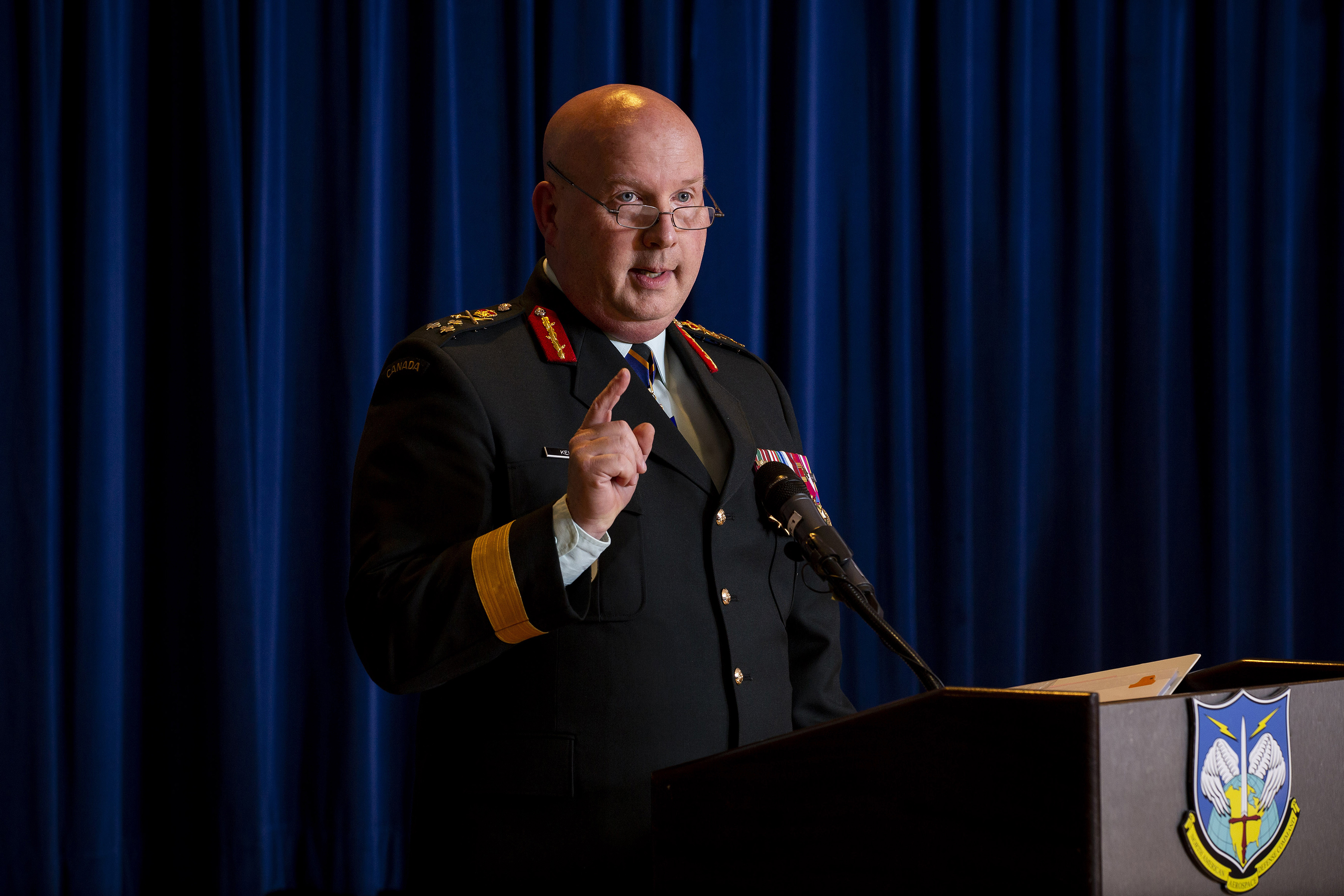
- Kelsey in 2025
- Military career
- Allegiance: Canada
- Branch: Canadian Army
- Service years: 1985–present
- Rank: Lieutenant-General
- Commands: Vice Chief of the Defence Staff
- Awards: Commander of the Order of Military Merit; Canadian Forces' Decoration

Lieutenant-General Stephen Kelsey, CMM, CD is a senior officer serving in the Canadian Army. He served as Vice Chief of the Defence Staff from August 2024 to May 2026.

== Military career ==
Kelsey joined the Canadian Army in 1985 and was commissioned in 1988. He became commander of the Western Area Training Centre in 2010, Director of Armour in 2013 and commander of CFB Kingston in 2015. After being deployed to Iraq, he became Canadian Army Director General Land Capability Development and Chief of Staff Strategy in 2017, Chief Force Development in 2020 and deputy commander at Allied Joint Force Command Naples in June 2022. On August 1, 2024, he assumed office as Vice Chief of the Defence Staff.

== Honours and decorations ==

Ribbon	Description	Notes
	Order of Military Merit (CMM)	Commander 2022; Officer 2019
	General Campaign Star	South-West Asia
	General Campaign Star	Expedition
	Special Service Medal	
	Canadian Peacekeeping Service Medal	
	UN Military Observer Mission in Prevlaka (Croatia)	With "2" Numeral
	UN Special Service Medal	
	Queen Elizabeth II Diamond Jubilee Medal	
	Canadian Forces' Decoration (CD)	2 Clasps, 32 years of Canadian Forces service
	Legion of Merit	United States of America, Degree of Officer
	Meritorious Service Medal	United States of America
	National Defence Medal	France, Degree of Gold

Military offices
Preceded by Frances J. Allen	Vice Chief of the Defence Staff; 2024–2026	Succeeded by Angus Topshee
