= Marquis Hainse =

Canadian army officer

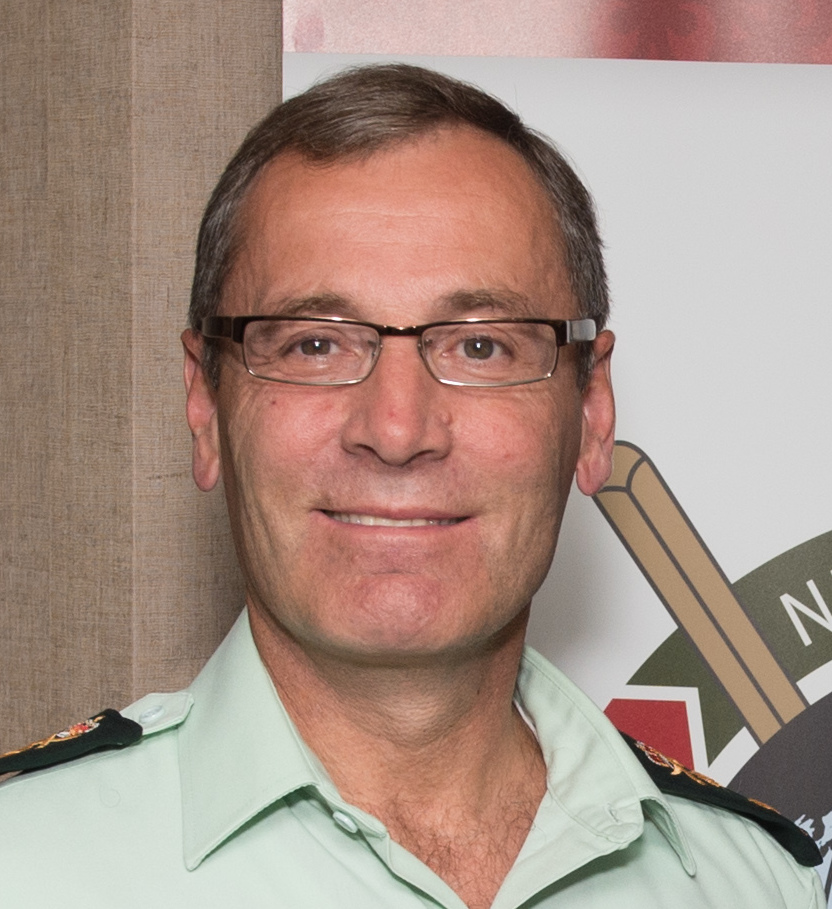
- Military career
- Allegiance: Canada
- Branch: Canadian Army
- Rank: Lieutenant General
- Commands: 1st Bn Royal 22^{e} Régiment; 5 Canadian Mechanized Brigade Group
- Conflicts: War in Afghanistan
- Awards: Commander of the Order of Military Merit; Meritorious Service Cross; Canadian Forces' Decoration

Lieutenant General Marquis Hainse CMM, MSC, CD is a Canadian Army officer who served as Chief of the Army Staff and Commander of the Canadian Army.

== Military career ==
Hainse joined the Canadian Forces in 1977 and was commissioned into the Royal 22^{e} Régiment in 1980. He was deployed during the Oka Crisis in 1990 and again during the North American Ice Storm of 1998. He became Commanding Officer of 1st Battalion Royal 22^{e} Régiment at Port-au-Prince in Haiti in 1996, Chief of Staff of Land Force Quebec Area in 2001 and Commander of the Bosnia and Herzegovina Task Force in April 2002. He went on to be senior officer in charge of international operations at the National Defence Headquarters later in 2002, Commander of 5 Canadian Mechanized Brigade Group in September 2004 and Chief of Staff of Canada Command in Ottawa in July 2006. He then served in Afghanistan as Deputy Commander Regional Command South in 2007 and became Commander of Land Force Doctrine and Training System in May 2008 before becoming Chief of Programme at National Defence Headquarters in Ottawa in August 2010 and then Deputy Commander Allied Joint Force Command Naples in 2011.

Hainse became Chief of the Army Staff and Commander of the Canadian Army in July 2013. It was announced on 19 January 2016 that Hainse would be replaced as Commander of the Canadian Army and would serve as the military representative at NATO Headquarters in Brussels. His replacement would be Major-General Paul Wynnyk.

== Medals and awards ==
Medals and awards include:

Ribbon	Description	Notes
	Order of Military Merit	Commander of the Order
	Meritorious Service Cross	
	South-West Asia Service Medal	
	Special Service Medal	
	Canadian Peacekeeping Service Medal	
	UN Mission in Cyprus	
	UN Mission in Haiti	
	NATO Medal for Former Yugoslavia	
	125th Anniversary of the Confederation of Canada Medal	
	Queen Elizabeth II Diamond Jubilee Medal	
	Canadian Forces' Decoration	with 2 bars for 32 years of service
	NATO Meritorious Service Medal	
	French Legion d'honeur	Level of Officer
	Officer of the Legion of Merit	
	Brazilian Order of Military Merit	
	Victory Cross - Chile	
	Faith in the Cause Military Medal - Columbia	

Military offices
Preceded by Peter Devlin	Commander of the Canadian Army; 2013–2016	Succeeded by Paul Wynnyk
