= Frances J. Allen =

Canadian general officer

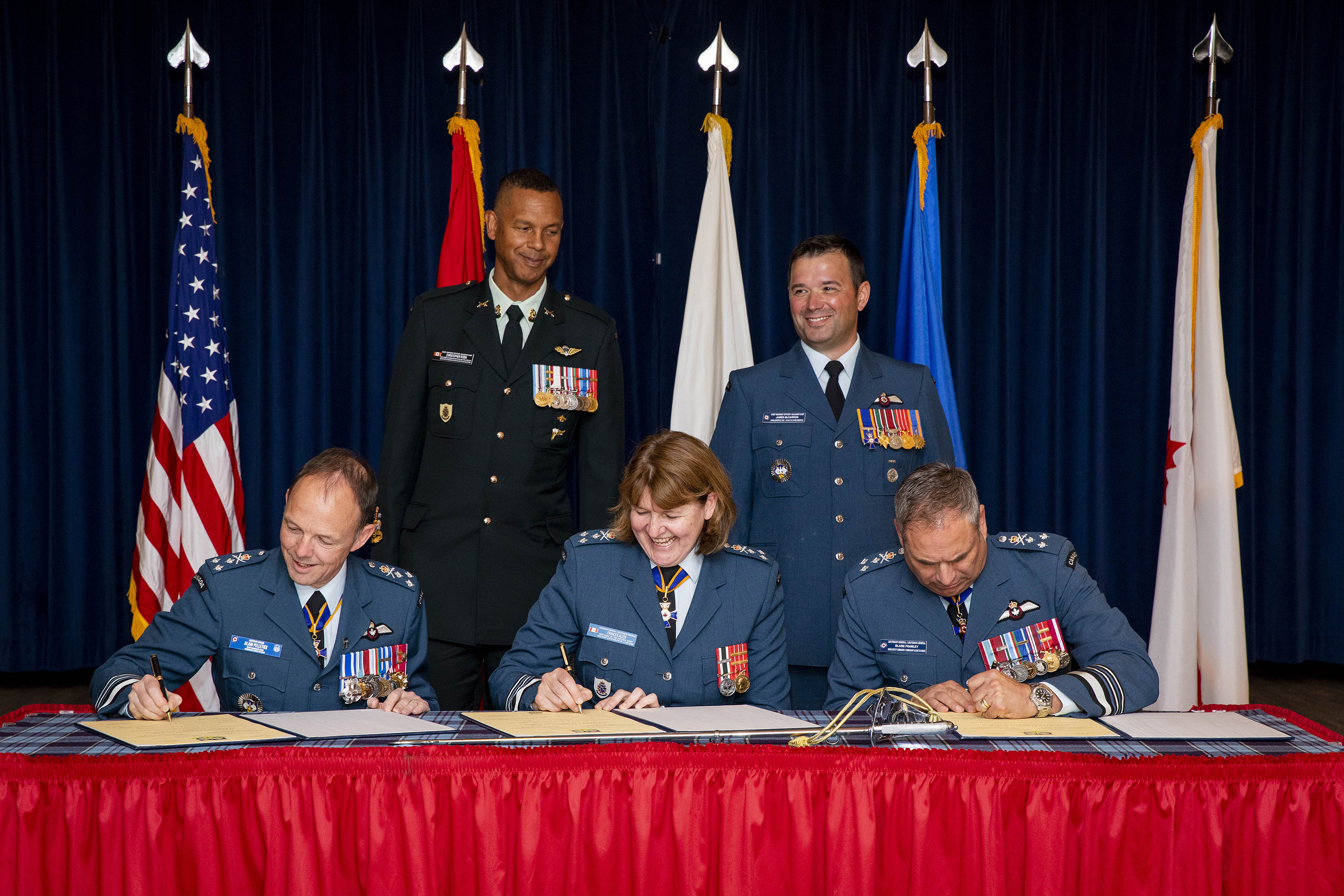
- Allen (seated centre)
- Military career
- Allegiance: Canada
- Branch: Royal Canadian Air Force (Note: Known as Air Command until 2011)
- Service years: 1983–present
- Rank: Lieutenant-General
- Units: 764 Communications Squadron; 76 Communications Group
- Commands: Vice Chief of the Defence Staff; Joint Force Cyber Component; Canadian Forces Information Operations Group; Canadian Forces Network Operations Centre; National Systems Management Centre Ottawa
- Awards: Commander of the Order of Military Merit; Canadian Forces' Decoration

Lieutenant-General Frances Jennifer Allen, CMM, CD is a senior officer serving in the Royal Canadian Air Force. On June 28, 2021, she assumed office as Vice Chief of the Defence Staff, becoming the first woman to hold the position.

== Military career ==
Allen's prior roles included serving as the Canadian military's director general for cyberspace, the National Defence Headquarters director general for information management operations, the joint force cyber component commander, and deputy Vice Chief of the Defence Staff.

In July 2020, Allen was appointed as Canada's military representative at NATO headquarters in Brussels. Allen was considered a contender to become Chief of the Defence Staff after the departure of General Jonathan Vance in January 2021, but that position was given to Admiral Art McDonald.

On March 9, 2021, it was announced that Allen would succeed Lieutenant-General Michael Rouleau as Vice Chief of the Defence Staff, making her the first woman to serve in that role. Allen's appointment to the vice chief position came amidst increased public and political scrutiny of the senior leadership of the Canadian Armed Forces because of sexual misconduct investigations into the two previous chiefs of the Defence Staff (Vance and McDonald).

Allen was appointed an Officer of the Order of Military Merit on 6 March 2017, and advanced to a Commander of the Order of Military Merit on 27 May 2019.

== Honours and decorations ==

Ribbon	Description	Notes
	Order of Military Merit (CMM)	Appointed Officer in 2017; Appointed Commander in 2019
	Special Service Medal	
	Canadian Forces' Decoration (CD)	2 Clasps; 32 years of service in the Canadian Forces

== Notes ==
Military offices
Preceded by Michael Rouleau	Vice Chief of the Defence Staff; 2021–2024	Succeeded by Stephen Kelsey
