= Guy Thibault =

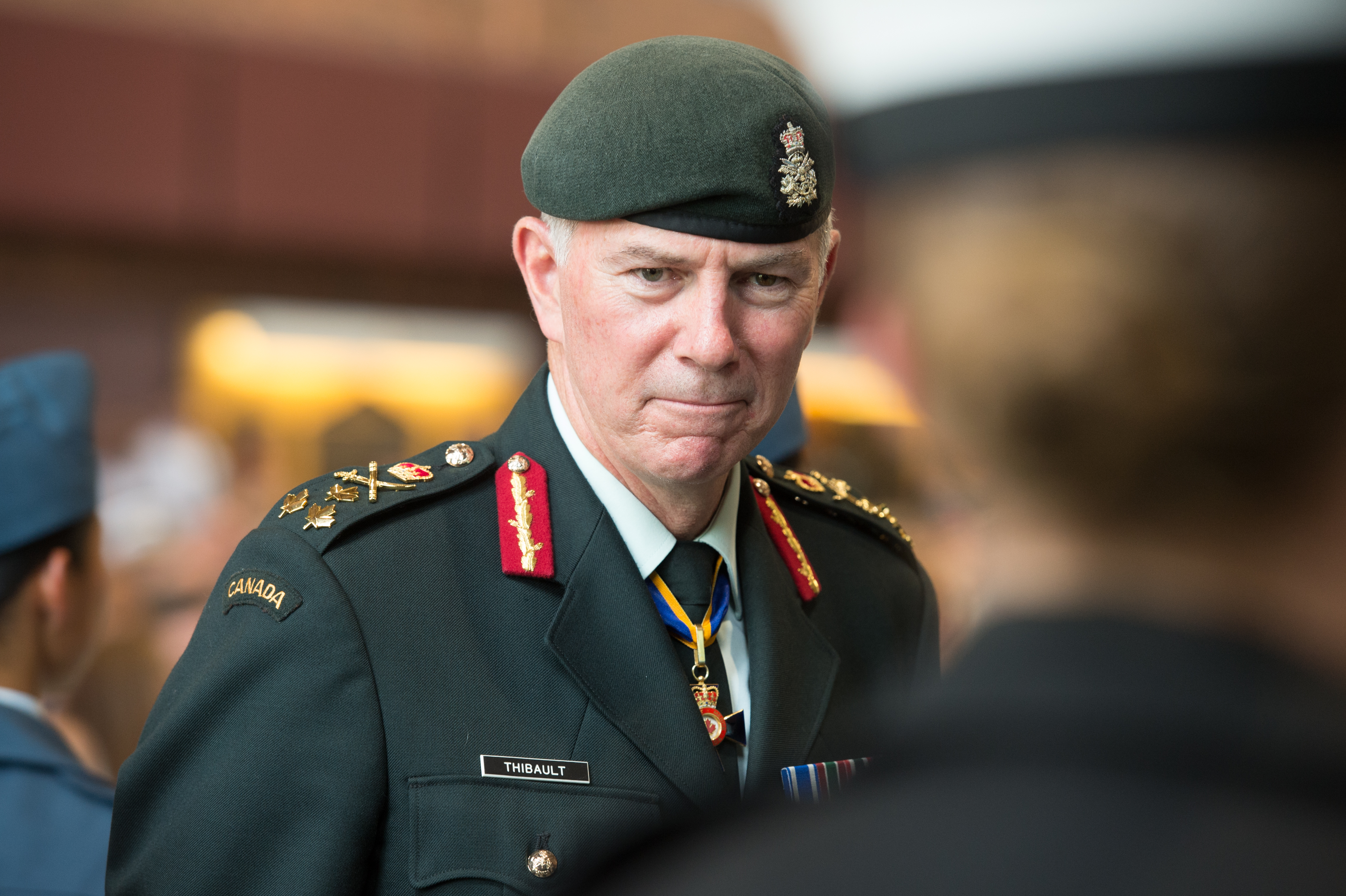
- Guy Thibault
- Allegiance: Canada
- Branch: Canadian Army
- Service years: 1978–2016
- Rank: Lieutenant-General
- Commands: CFB Kingston; Land Force Central Area
- Conflicts: War in Afghanistan
- Awards: Commander of the Order of Military Merit; Canadian Forces' Decoration; Meritorious Service Cross

Guy Robert Thibault is a retired Canadian Army officer. He is a former Vice Chief of the Defence Staff in Canada.

== Military career ==
Thibault joined the Canadian Forces in 1978. He became Base Commander, CFB Kingston in 2002 before deploying with the International Security Assistance Force in Afghanistan in 2004. He went on to be Commander of Land Force Central Area in 2005, Assistant Chief of the Land Staff in 2007 and Chief of Staff (Information Management) in 2009. After that he became Chairman of the Inter-American Defense Board in June 2011 and Vice Chief of the Defence Staff in September 2013. On 13 September 2013, he was awarded the Meritorious Service Cross.

On 19 January 2016, it was announced that Lieutenant-General Thibault would retire and be replaced in his position by Vice-Admiral Mark Norman. He retired from Canadian Armed Forces on 8 August 2016.

== Honours and decorations ==

Ribbon	Description	Notes
	Order of Military Merit (CMM)	
	Meritorious Service Cross (MSC)	
	General Campaign Star	
	Special Service Medal	
	Queen Elizabeth II's Diamond Jubilee Medal	
	Canadian Forces' Decoration (CD)	2 Clasps; 32 years of Canadian Forces service

Military offices
Preceded by Bruce Donaldson	Vice Chief of the Defence Staff; 2013–2016	Succeeded by Mark Norman
