= Denis Rouleau =

Joseph Alphonse Denis Rouleau
- Military career
- Allegiance: Canada
- Branch: Royal Canadian Navy
- Service years: 1972 - 2012
- Rank: Vice-Admiral
- Commands: Vice Chief of the Defence Staff
- Awards: Commander of the Order of Military Merit; Meritorious Service Medal; Canadian Forces' Decoration

Vice-Admiral Joseph Alphonse Denis Rouleau CMM MSM CD is a retired officer who served in the Royal Canadian Navy.

== Career ==
Rouleau completed a bachelor's degree in engineering and management at the Royal Military College of Canada and attended the Canadian Forces College, graduating the Advanced Military Studies Course and the National Security Studies Course.

Rouleau served as executive officer on HMCS Skeena and as commanding officer on HMCS Athabaskan, both destroyers, before becoming the first Canadian naval officer ever assigned to NORAD. After serving in various administrative positions at the National Defence Headquarters, he took command of the multi-national Standing NATO Maritime Group One before heading back to Ottawa.

From June 15, 2008, until July 25, 2010, Rouleau served as the Vice Chief of the Defence Staff.

Rouleau's last posting from August 2010 until his retirement in 2012 was as Canada's military representative to the North Atlantic Treaty Organization.

== Awards and decorations ==
Rouleau's personal awards and decorations include the following:

Ribbon	Description	Notes
	Order of Military Merit (CMM)	Appointed Commander (CMM) on 28 November 2008; Appointed Officer (OMM) on 29 September 2004
	Meritorious Service Medal (MSM)	Decoration awarded on 23 November 2007; Military division
	Special Service Medal	with NATO-OTAN Clasp
	Queen Elizabeth II Silver Jubilee Medal	Decoration awarded in 1977; Canadian version
	Queen Elizabeth II Golden Jubilee Medal	Decoration awarded 2002; Canadian version
	Queen Elizabeth II Diamond Jubilee Medal	Decoration awarded in 2012; Canadian version
	Canadian Forces' Decoration (CD)	with two Clasp for 32 years of services

Military offices
Preceded by W.J. Natynczyk	Vice Chief of the Defence Staff; 2008-2010	Succeeded by B. Donaldson
