= Jean-Marc Lanthier (general) =

Canadian army officer

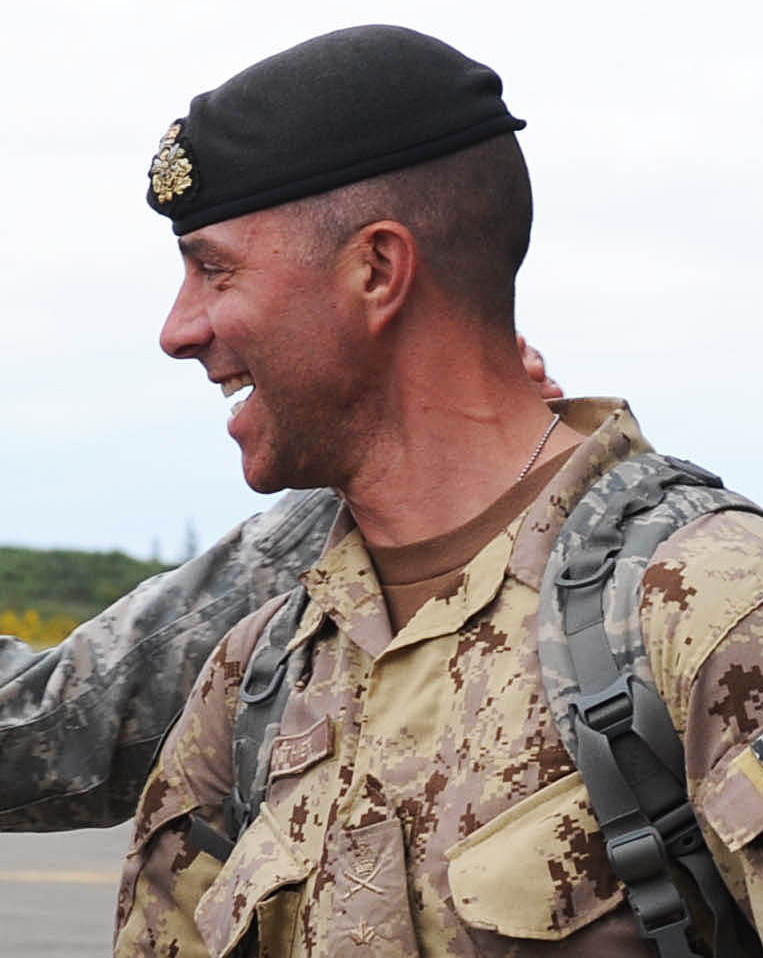
- Military career
- Allegiance: Canada
- Branch: Canadian Army
- Service years: 1989–2020
- Rank: Lieutenant General
- Commands: Vice Chief of the Defence Staff; Commander of the Canadian Army; Canadian Army Doctrine and Training Centre; 2nd Canadian Division; 5 Canadian Mechanized Brigade Group; 12e Régiment blindé du Canada
- Conflicts: War in Afghanistan
- Awards: Commander of the Order of Military Merit; Meritorious Service Medal; Canadian Forces' Decoration

Lieutenant General Jean-Marc Lanthier, CMM, MSM, CD is a retired Canadian Army officer who was Commander of the Canadian Army from July 2018 to July 2019. He was Vice Chief of the Defence Staff from July 2019 to his announcement of retiring in March 2020.

== Personal life ==
Jean-Marc Lanthier's is married to Pamela (Pam) Lanthier, a native off Nova Scotia. The couple has two children, a son named Gabriel and a daughter named Victoria.

Following his military career, Lanthier transitioned to the private sector and is the CEO of ADGA Group.

== Military career ==
Lanthier was commissioned as an armoured officer in the Canadian Armed Forces in 1989 and after graduating from the University of Ottawa. He became commanding officer of the 12e Régiment blindé du Canada and went on to be commander of 5 Canadian Mechanized Brigade Group. After that he became Deputy Commanding General Sustainment I Corps, a unit of the United States Army, in June 2011, Commander of 2nd Canadian Division in July 2013, and Commander Canadian Army Doctrine and Training Centre in July 2014, before becoming Chief of Programme in April 2017.

Lanthier was appointed Commander of the Canadian Army on 16 July 2018. A year later, on 18 July 2019, he succeeded Lieutenant General Paul Wynnyk as Vice Chief of the Defence Staff.

== Honours and decorations ==

Ribbon	Description	Notes
	Order of Military Merit (CMM)	
	Meritorious Service Cross (MSC)	
	Meritorious Service Medal (MSM)	
	General Campaign Star	South-West Asia
	Operational Service Medal	
	Canadian Peacekeeping Service Medal	
	UN Protection Force (Yugoslavia)	With "2" Numeral
	NATO Medal for Former Yugoslavia	
	Queen Elizabeth II's Diamond Jubilee Medal	
	Canadian Forces' Decoration (CD)	1 Clasp 22 years of service in the Canadian Forces
	Legion of Merit	Degree of Officer Awarded by the United States of America

Military offices
Preceded by Paul Wynnyk	Commander of the Canadian Army; 2018–2019	Succeeded by Wayne Eyre
Preceded by Paul Wynnyk	Vice Chief of the Defence Staff; 2019–2020	Succeeded by Michael Rouleau
