= List of active duty Canadian flag officers =

As of 28 January 2025, there are currently 145 active-duty General and Flag Officers in the Canadian Armed Forces. There is 1 Four Star Flag Officer, 10 Three Star Flag Officers, and 36 Two Star Flag Officers.

== List of top General and Flag Officer positions ==
=== Four Maple Leaves Flag Officers ===
Position	Photo	Incumbent
Chief of the Defence Staff		General; Marie Annabelle Jennie Carignan

=== Three Maple Leaves Flag Officers ===
Position	Photo	Incumbent
Vice Chief of the Defence Staff		Lieutenaut-General; Stephen Kelsey
Chief Professional Conduct and Culture		Lieutenaut-General; Jacques Paul-Robert Prévost
Commander of the Royal Canadian Air Force		Lieutenaut-General; Jamie Speiser-Blanchet
Deputy Commander Allied Joint Force Command Naples		Lieutenaut-General; Peter Scott
Commander of the Canadian Army		Lieutenaut-General; Michael Charles Wright
Commander Canadian Joint Operations Command		Lieutenaut-General; Steve Boivin
Chief of Military Personnel and Commander Military Personnel Command		Lieutenaut-General; Erick Simoneau
Deputy Commander North American Aerospace Defense Command (NORAD)		Lieutenaut-General; Iain S. Huddleston
Deputy Commander of United Nations Command in Korea		Lieutenaut-General; Derek Allen Macaulay
Commander of the Royal Canadian Navy		Vice-Admiral; Angus Topshee

== See also ==
- General (Canada)
- Canadian Armed Forces ranks and insignia
