= Robert Hilborn Falls =

- Falls in 1978
- Born: April 29, 1924; Welland, Ontario, Canada
- Died: November 6, 2009 (aged 85); Ottawa, Ontario, Canada
- Spouse: Isabelle Urie
- Military career
- Allegiance: Canada
- Branch: Royal Canadian Air Force (1942–45); Royal Naval Volunteer Reserve (1945); Royal Canadian Navy (1945–68); Canadian Forces Maritime Command (1968–83)
- Service years: 1942–1980
- Rank: Admiral
- Commands: Chairman of the NATO Military Committee; Chief of Defence Staff; Vice Chief of the Defence Staff; Canadian Flotilla Atlantic; HMCS Bonaventure; HMCS Chaudière
- Conflicts: World War II
- Awards: Commander of the Order of Military Merit; Canadian Forces' Decoration
- Other work: President of the Canadian Centre for Arms Control and Disarmament (now the Canadian Council for International Peace and Security)

Admiral Robert Hilborn Falls, CMM, CD (April 24, 1924 – November 6, 2009) was Chief of Defence Staff of the Canadian Forces from 1977 to 1980.

== Military career ==
Falls first joined the Royal Canadian Air Force in 1942 as a pilot and later transferred to the Royal Canadian Navy after World War II. He served as commander of the Canadian Flotilla Atlantic, as Vice Chief of the Defence Staff from 1974 to 1977, as Chief of Defence Staff of the Canadian Forces from 1977 to 1980, and as Chairman of the NATO Military Committee from 1980 to 1983.

Falls later became president of the Canadian Centre for Arms Control and Disarmament (now the Canadian Council for International Peace and Security).

== Awards and decorations ==
Falls' personal awards and decorations received during his naval career include the following:

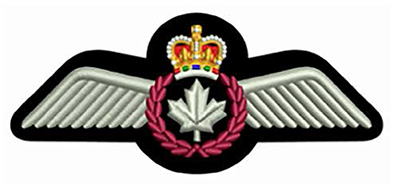

Ribbon	Description	Notes
	Commander of the Order of Military Merit (CMM)	Appointed on 26 January 1976
	Canadian Volunteer Service Medal	WWII 1939-1945 with Overseas Service bar
	War Medal 1939–1945	WWII 1939-1945
	Special Service Medal	with NATO-OTAN Clasp
	Canadian Centennial Medal	Decoration awarded in 1967
	Queen Elizabeth II Silver Jubilee Medal	Decoration awarded in 1977; Canadian version
	Canadian Forces' Decoration (CD)	with two Clasp for 32 years of services

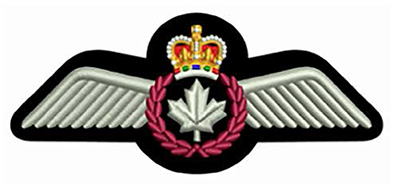
- He was a qualified RCAF Pilot and as such wore the Royal Canadian Forces Pilot Wings

Military offices
Preceded by A.C. Hull	Vice Chief of the Defence Staff; 1974–1977	Succeeded by R.M. Withers
Preceded by J.A. Dextraze	Chief of the Defence Staff; 1977–1980	Succeeded by R.M. Withers
