= Ramsey Muir Withers =

Canadian general (1930-2014)

- Born: July 28, 1930; Scarborough, Ontario
- Died: December 24, 2014 (aged 84); Ottawa, Ontario
- Military career
- Allegiance: Canada
- Branch: Canadian Army / Canadian Forces
- Service years: 1948-1983
- Rank: General
- Awards: CMM, CStJ, CD, LL.D
- Other work: Deputy Minister of Transport

General Ramsey Muir Withers, CMM, CD (July 28, 1930 – December 24, 2014) was a Canadian Army Officer and Chief of the Defence Staff, the highest ranking position in the Canadian Forces, from 1980 to 1983. He died of a heart attack in 2014.

== Military career ==
Born in Scarborough, Ontario, to Scottish immigrant parents, Withers spent 35 years in uniform, serving in the Korean War and in command and staff positions throughout Canada and overseas. General Ramsey Withers served 35 years in the Regular Force and six years in the Militia. His reserve service was as Honorary Lieutenant-Colonel of the Governor-General's Foot Guards. Withers was a professional engineer and a Fellow of Georgian College, holding earned degrees from the Royal Military College of Canada (student # 2951) and Queen's University. He was a graduate of the Canadian Army Staff College and Britain's Joint Services Staff College.

On graduation from the Royal Military College of Canada in 1952, his first posting was to 1 R 22eR in Korea. He was commissioned as a lieutenant in the Royal Canadian Corps of Signals. His first appointment as a general officer was in 1970 as the founding Commander of Canadian Forces Northern Region, with headquarters in Yellowknife, Northwest Territories. He commanded Canadian Forces Europe, in the rank of major-general. In 1977 on promotion to lieutenant-general, he returned to Canada as Vice Chief of the Defence Staff. In 1980, on promotion to general, he was appointed Canada's sixth Chief of Defence Staff (CDS) and Principal Commander of the Order of Military Merit. He retired in 1983. He was appointed Deputy Minister of Transport Canada 1983 until 1988, and served under Ministers Pépin, Axworthy, Mazankowski and Crosbie. During which time he was awarded the Commissioner's Award of the Northwest Territories in 1973 and the Outstanding Achievement Award of the Public Service of Canada. He retired from the Public Service in 1988.

== Personal life ==
He married Alison Saunders in 1954. She died on 19 October 2011. They were survived by their son, twin daughters, and six grandchildren.

== Civilian career ==
After retirement, Withers became president of a government relations firm, director of an aerospace technology company, a consultant to the Office of the Auditor General and Chairman of the Industry Government Relations Group. From 1988 to 1998, he worked in the private sector as president of one government relations firm and founding chairman of another, as a director of an aerospace technology company and as a consultant to the Office of the Auditor General.

== Voluntary work ==
He also continued to be active in volunteer work. In addition to chairing the 1998 Royal Military College Board of Governors Study on Undergraduate Programs (culminating in the Withers Report), Withers was the honorary director of the Canadian War Museum. He was a former Trustee of the Canadian Museum of Civilization and from 1988 to 1995 was Chairman of the Canadian War Museum Committee, former Director of the Canadian Institute of Strategic Studies, and an Honorary Vice-President of the Boy Scouts of Canada. He was an Honorary Life Director of the Friends of the Canadian War Museum. From 1997 to 2003 he was an elected member of Queen's University Council and, was Honorary President of the Royal Military Colleges Club of Canada as well as an Honorary Life Member. He also served as a Director of the CDA Institute.

== Honours ==
Decorations include Commander of the Order of Military Merit, Commander of the Venerable Order of St. John and the Canadian Forces decoration with two bars. He served from 1977 to 1990 on the National Council of Scouts Canada and was a recipient of the Silver Wolf Award.

Other awards include the Canadian Centennial Medal (1967), the Confederation of Canada 125 Medal (1992), The Queen Elizabeth II Silver Jubilee Medal (1977), Queen Elizabeth II Golden Jubilee Medal (2002), The Commissioner's Award of the Northwest Territories, the Outstanding Achievement Award of the Public Service of Canada and the National Transportation Award of Excellence.

Ramsey Withers held two doctorates (honoris causa), was a Fellow of Georgian College and an honorary graduate of the National Defense College and the NATO Defense College. He was the recipient of the 1995 Queen's University Alumni Achievement Award and the 1996 Bi-Centennial Award of Merit from the City of Scarborough. In 2002, on being nominated by The Royal Canadian Legion, he was awarded the Queen Elizabeth II Golden Jubilee Medal.

He was awarded the Commissioner's Award of the Northwest Territories and the Outstanding Achievement Award of the Public Service of Canada. He is the winner of the Queen's University Alumni Achievement Award. He was an honorary graduate of the National Defence College and the NATO Defense College. Archie Cairns composed the General Ramsey M. Withers (3/4 Retreat March 2003) for bagpipes in his honour.

== Awards and decorations ==
Withers received the following orders and decorations:

Ribbon	Description	Notes
	Order of Military Merit (CMM)	Appointed Commander (CMM) on 12 December 1977
	Order of Saint John	Appointed Commander in 1981; Appointed Officer in 1979
	Korea Medal	1950-1953
	Canadian Volunteer Service Medal for Korea	
	Special Service Medal	with NATO-OTAN Clasp
	United Nations Korea Medal	1950-1954
	Canadian Centennial Medal	Decoration awarded in 1967
	Queen Elizabeth II Silver Jubilee Medal	Decoration awarded in 1977
	125th Anniversary of the Confederation of Canada Medal	Decoration awarded in 1992
	Queen Elizabeth II Golden Jubilee Medal	Decoration awarded in 2002; Canadian version
	Queen Elizabeth II Diamond Jubilee Medal	Decoration awarded in 2012; Canadian version
	Canadian Forces' Decoration (CD)	with two Clasp for 32 years of services

Military offices
Preceded by R.H. Falls	Vice Chief of the Defence Staff; 1977-1980	Succeeded by G.C.É. Thériault
Preceded by R.H. Falls	Chief of the Defence Staff; 1980-1983	Succeeded by G.C.É. Thériault
