= Daniel Mainguy =

Canadian officer (1930–2010)

Daniel Nicholas Mainguy
- Born: 2 December 1930; Victoria, British Columbia
- Died: 17 August 2010 (aged 79); Ottawa, Ontario
- Military career
- Allegiance: Canada
- Branch: Royal Canadian Navy; Canadian Forces
- Service years: 1949–1985
- Rank: Vice-Admiral
- Commands: HMCS Annapolis
- Awards: Commander of the Order of Military Merit; Canadian Forces' Decoration

Vice-Admiral Daniel Nicholas Mainguy CMM, CD (2 December 1930–17 August 2010) was a Canadian Forces officer who served as Vice Chief of the Defence Staff.

== Career ==
The son of Vice-Admiral Rollo Mainguy, Mainguy joined the Royal Canadian Navy in 1949, initially in the Reserve and then, from 1950, in the Regular service. He became Commanding Officer of HMCS Annapolis in 1966, Staff Officer and Operations Officer with Standing Naval Force Atlantic in 1967 and Director of Operational Readiness Maritime in 1970. He went on to be Director of Strategic Planning in 1973, Chief of Maritime Doctrine and Operations in 1976 and Chief of Staff to the Commander-in-Chief, Western Atlantic in 1979. After that he became Deputy Chief of the Defence Staff in 1982 and Vice Chief of the Defence Staff in 1983 before retiring in 1985. He died in August 2010.

== Awards and decorations ==
Mainguy's personal awards and decorations include the following:

Ribbon	Description	Notes
	Order of Military Merit (CMM)	Appointed Commander (CMM) on 15 June 1981
	Special Service Medal	with NATO-OTAN Clasp
	Canadian Forces' Decoration (CD)	with two Clasp for 32 years of service

Military offices
Preceded by Gérard Thériault	Vice Chief of the Defence Staff; 1983–1985	Succeeded by Jack Vance
