= Patrick O'Donnell (Canadian general) =

- Born: July 12, 1940; Toronto, Ontario, Canada
- Died: September 24, 2015 (aged 75); Ottawa, Ontario, Canada
- Military career
- Allegiance: Canada
- Branch: Canadian Forces
- Service years: 1959–1995
- Rank: Lieutenant-General
- Commands: Northern Region
- Awards: Commander of the Order of Military Merit; Canadian Forces' Decoration

Lieutenant-General Patrick J. "Paddy" O'Donnell CMM CD (July 12, 1940 – September 24, 2015) was a Canadian Forces officer. He was Vice Chief of the Defence Staff in Canada.

== Military career ==
Educated at Queen's University, O'Donnell joined the Royal Canadian Air Force in 1959 and pursued a flying career. He became Commander of Canada's Northern Region in 1987, Deputy Commander of Air Command in 1990 and Assistant Deputy Minister (Personnel) at the National Defence Headquarters in 1992. His last appointment was as Vice Chief of the Defence Staff in 1993 before retiring in 1995.

In retirement he became Director of Business Planning at Spar Aerospace. After working at Spar, he became a partner at CFN Consultants in Ottawa, retiring early in 2015. On September 24, 2015, O'Donnell died at the age of 75.

Military offices
Preceded by John Anderson	Vice Chief of the Defence Staff; 1993–1995	Succeeded by Larry Murray
