= Peter Devlin =

Peter Devlin may refer to:

- Peter Devlin (general), 21st-century Canadian Army officer
- Peter Devlin (snooker player) (born 1996)
- Peter J. Devlin, American sound engineer
