= Jack Vance (general) =

Vice Chief of the Defence Staff

- Born: John Elwood Vance; July 28, 1933; Tweed, Ontario, Canada
- Died: September 10, 2013 (aged 80) Tweed, Ontario, Canada
- Allegiance: Canada
- Branch: Canadian Army
- Service years: 1952–1988
- Rank: Lieutenant-General
- Commands: 3 Mechanized Commando; 4 Canadian Mechanized Brigade Group
- Awards: Commander of the Order of Military Merit; Canadian Forces' Decoration
- Children: Jonathan Vance

Lieutenant-General John Elwood "Jack" Vance, CMM, CD (July 28, 1933 – September 10, 2013) was a Canadian Forces officer who became Vice Chief of the Defence Staff in Canada.

== Career ==
Vance joined the Canadian Army in 1952 and graduated from the Royal Military College of Canada in 1956. He became Commanding Officer of 3 Mechanized Commando at CFB Baden-Soellingen in 1971, Deputy Chief of Staff Training in 1972, and Director Individual Training at National Defence Headquarters in 1973. He went on to be Director-General Recruiting, Education and Training in 1975, Commander of 4 Canadian Mechanized Brigade Group in 1976, and Chief of Staff Operations in 1978. After that he became Chief of Postings, Careers and Senior Appointments in 1980, Chief of Personnel in 1983, and Vice Chief of the Defence Staff in 1985 before retiring in 1988. He died in September 2013.

His son Jonathan, was Chief of the Defence Staff from 2015 to 2021.

Military offices
Preceded by Daniel Mainguy	Vice Chief of the Defence Staff; 1985–1988	Succeeded by John de Chastelain
