= Dan Charlebois =

Royal Canadian Navy officer

- Military career
- Allegiance: Canada
- Branch: Royal Canadian Navy (Note: Known as Canadian Forces Maritime Command until 2011)
- Service years: 1992–present
- Rank: Vice-Admiral
- Commands: Royal Canadian Navy
- Awards: Meritorious Service Medal; Canadian Forces' Decoration

Vice-Admiral Daniel Alan Charlebois, (born 1974 or 1975) MSM, CD is a Royal Canadian Navy officer who serves as Commander of the Royal Canadian Navy.

== Naval career ==
Charlebois joined the Canadian Armed Forces in 1992 and graduated from Wilfrid Laurier University in 1997. He was given command of the frigate HMCS Regina in 2013. He then became Director Structure Integration in Chief of Force Development in 2017, Commander of Combined Task Force 150 in 2020 and Director General Readiness at Canadian Joint Operations Command in July 2021. After that he was appointed Director General Future Ship Capability in 2022 and Deputy Commander of the Royal Canadian Navy in 2025. In May 2026, it was announced that he would become Commander of the Royal Canadian Navy. He took over the role on 16 June 2026.

Charlebois was awarded the Meritorious Service Medal for his work in an anti-terrorism role in the Indian Ocean in 2014.

== Notes ==
Military offices
Preceded by Angus Topshee	Commander of the Royal Canadian Navy; 2026–present	Incumbent
