= Jean-Marc Lanthier =

Jean-Marc Lanthier may refer to:

- Jean-Marc Lanthier (general), Canadian Army officer
- Jean-Marc Lanthier (ice hockey) (born 1963), Canadian ice hockey player
