= Jonathan Vance =

Canadian army general

General Jonathan Vance MSC CD
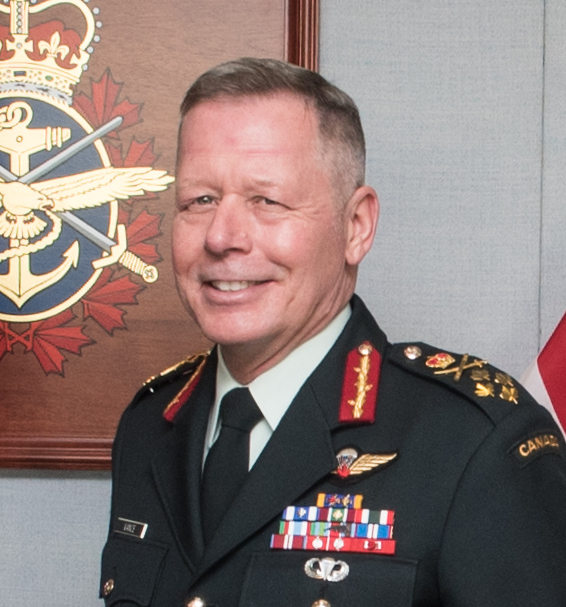
- Vance in 2018
- Born: Jonathan Holbert Vance; January 3, 1964 (age 62); Kingston, Ontario, Canada
- Alma mater: Royal Roads Military College (BA); Royal Military College of Canada (MA)
- Spouse: Kerry Vance
- Military career
- Allegiance: Canada
- Branch: Canadian Army
- Service years: 1982–2021
- Rank: General
- Nickname: Jon
- Commands: Chief of the Defence Staff; Canadian Joint Operations Command; Task Force Kandahar; 1 Canadian Mechanized Brigade Group; 2nd Battalion, Royal Canadian Regiment
- Conflicts: War in Afghanistan; Military intervention against ISIL
- Awards: Meritorious Service Cross; Canadian Forces' Decoration

General Jonathan Holbert Vance (born January 3, 1964) is a retired Canadian Forces officer who served as a general in the Canadian Army. Vance was the Chief of the Defence Staff from 2015 to 2021.

In July 2021, Vance was charged with one count of obstruction of justice, in relation to investigations of sexual misconduct. Prior to this charge, it was alleged he boasted that he was "untouchable" by military police due to his high rank. On March 30, 2022, Vance pleaded guilty to a summary (misdemeanour) charge of obstruction of justice, and subsequently received a conditional discharge.

== Early life, education and family ==
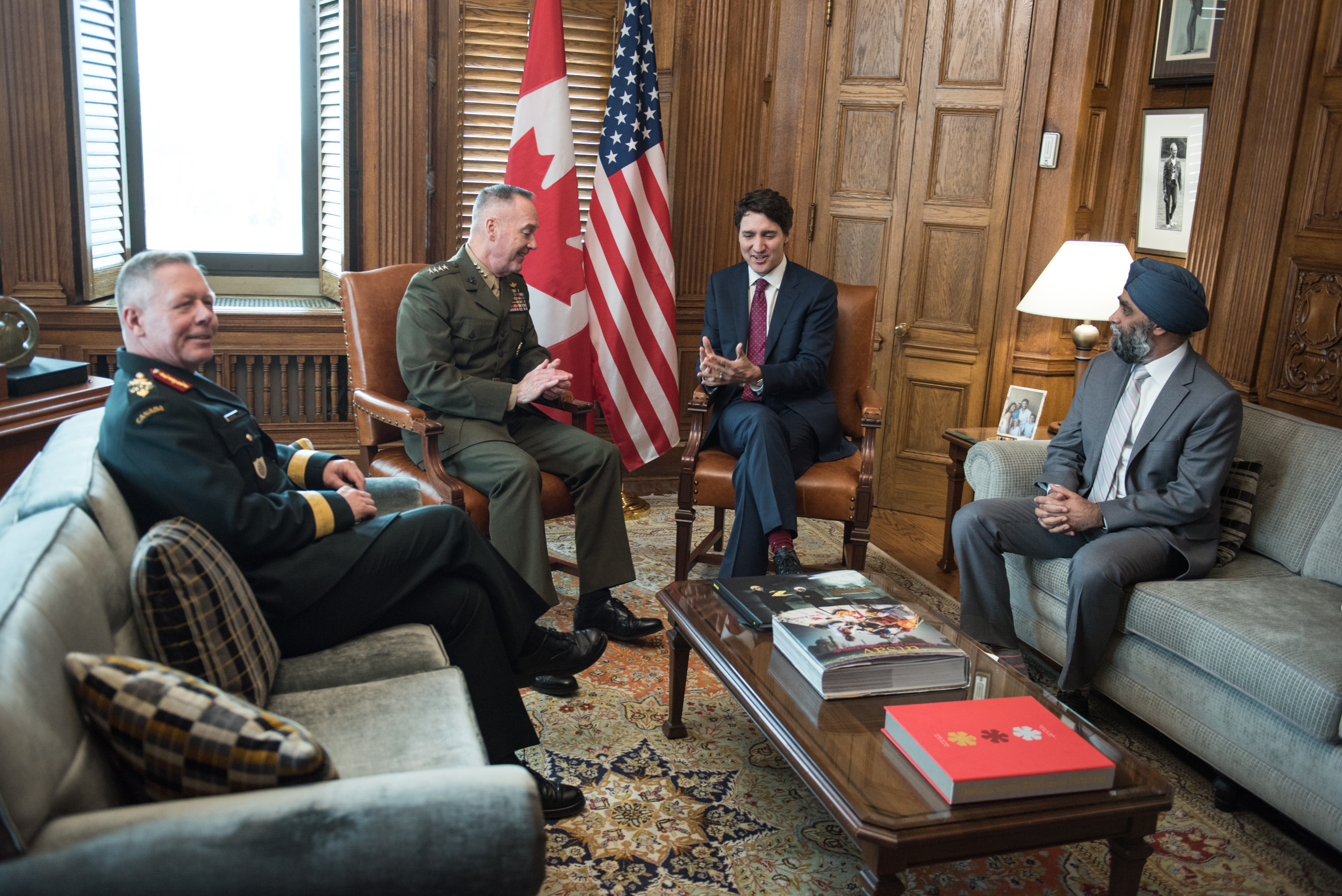
Vance (left) and meets with General Joseph Dunford of the United States, Prime Minister Justin Trudeau and Minister of National Defence Harjit Sajjan

Vance was born on January 3, 1964, in Kingston, Ontario. At the age of 13, while his father Jack Vance—a Canadian Forces officer—was posted in Lahr, Germany, he joined the Army Cadets.

His father Jack Vance reached the rank of lieutenant-general, and served as the Vice Chief of Defence Staff in 1985.

Vance himself went on to join the Canadian Forces in 1982, attending the Royal Roads Military College where he obtained a bachelor of arts (BA) in military and strategic studies in 1986. He also holds a master of arts (MA) degree in war studies from the Royal Military College of Canada.

His current wife is Kerry Vance (née Mahon), a retired United States Army colonel in the Judge Advocate General's Corps. The couple met when they were both serving in a NATO posting in Naples, Italy.

== Military career ==
Upon graduation in 1986, Vance was commissioned in the Canadian Forces as an infantry officer with The Royal Canadian Regiment. His father, Jack, was serving as the Vice Chief of the Defence Staff when he was commissioned.

He served as deputy commander of the Allied Joint Force Command Naples, and commander of the Canadian Task Force in Kandahar, Afghanistan in 2009 and 2010. He went on to be commander of the Canadian Joint Operations Command in September 2014.

=== Chief of the Defence Staff ===
On April 27, 2015, Prime Minister Stephen Harper announced that Vance had been selected as the new Chief of the Defence Staff. He formally succeeded General Thomas J. Lawson in the role following a transfer of command ceremony held on July 17, 2015.

In 2016, Vance announced Operation Honour which aimed to stamp out sexual misconduct in the Armed Forces.

=== Retirement ===
On July 23, 2020, Vance announced his intention to retire as chief of Defence Staff after five years in office, serving until his replacement would be named. Despite being a potential candidate for an upcoming vacancy as chairman of the NATO Military Committee, the federal government announced its intention not to pursue the competition.

On December 23, 2020, Prime Minister Justin Trudeau announced that Vance would be succeeded by then-Vice Admiral Art McDonald as Chief of the Defence Staff, with the change of command held on January 14, 2021.

== Misconduct allegations and guilty plea ==
Shortly following his retirement, a report emerged detailing inappropriate behaviour from Vance towards two female subordinates, at least one of which was allegedly "unwanted", possibly violating "directives that govern personal relationships and such actions might contravene provisions in the National Defence Act (NDA) that relate to good order and discipline."

Following the allegations, an investigation into Vance's conduct was launched by the Canadian Forces National Investigation Service, a unit of the Military Police. Additionally, the House of Commons defence committee voted to study the matter, and the Department of National Defence committed to an external probe into Vance, which has since expanded to "also deal with rising concerns that the issue of sexual misconduct by the senior ranks could be a systemic issue in the Canadian Armed Forces".

On July 15, 2021, Vance was formally charged with obstruction of justice under Section 139 of the Criminal Code. The indictment focuses on allegations made by Major Kellie Brennan that he instructed her to lie when being interviewed by military police investigating charges against him. Vance was reportedly engaged in a 20-year consensual relationship with Brennan, concurrent with his higher rank in the military and fathered two of her eight children. Brennan says that Vance told her that he was "untouchable" and that he "owned" the military police. Subsequent paternity testing showed that one child had 99.99991% chance of being fathered by Vance, while the other child did not.

No charges were laid against Vance under the military justice system. Following a review of the law by Morris Fish, retired justice of the Supreme Court of Canada Fish concluded that given Vance's high rank, it would not have been possible to empanel a military jury, which must be composed of officers of equal or higher rank.

On March 30, 2022, Vance pleaded guilty to one count of obstruction of justice in the Ontario Court of Justice in Ottawa. As a result of the guilty plea, he was given a conditional discharge with 80 hours of community service and 12 months of probation. Vance's criminal defence lawyer, Rodney Sellar, also confirmed that due to the turn of events, Vance started to pay child support to Kellie Brennan. Furthermore, Sellar emphasized that Vance's reputation and finances have suffered immensely as a consequence of the criminal charge and subsequent guilty plea. In Canada, a conditional discharge stays on the criminal record for three years after sentencing and thereafter will be sealed by the Royal Canadian Mounted Police.

In May 2022, Vance was expelled from the alumni association of the Royal Military College of Canada over his guilty plea.

== Awards and decorations ==
Vance has received the following orders and decorations during his military career:

Honours and decorations
Ribbon	Description	Notes
	Meritorious Service Cross (MSC)	With Bar; December 13, 2011
	General Campaign Star	Southwest Asia; With two rotation bars
	Special Service Medal	With NATO clasp
	Canadian Peacekeeping Service Medal	
	UNPROFOR	With MID Oakleaf March 10, 1995
	Queen Elizabeth II Golden Jubilee Medal	2002; Canadian Version of this Medal
	Queen Elizabeth II Diamond Jubilee Medal	2012; Canadian Version of this Medal
	Canadian Forces' Decoration (CD)	With 2 clasps
	Commander of the National Order of the Legion of Honour	Foreign honour from the French Republic; Filed with the Canada Gazette on September 30, 2017
	Order of Viesturs, First Class	Foreign honour from the Republic of Latvia; Filed with the Canada Gazette on September 29, 2018
	Commander of the National Order of the Star of Romania	Foreign honour from the Republic of Romania; Filed with the Canada Gazette on June 29, 2019

- Vance was a qualified Paratrooper and as such wore the Canadian Forces Jump Wings with Red Maple Leaf.
- By virtue of his position, he served as an aide-de-camp to the Governor General of Canada, and as such he wore the gold aiguillette to denote this position.
- At his request, Vance's appointment to the Order of Military Merit in the grade of Commander was terminated effective April 20, 2022 by the Governor General of Canada Mary Simon. He was appointed as an Officer of the Order in 2010 and upgraded to Commander in 2015.

Military offices
Preceded by Tom Lawson	Chief of the Defence Staff; 2015–2021	Succeeded by Art McDonald
Preceded by Stuart Beare	Commander of the Canadian Joint Operations Command; 2014–2015	Succeeded by Stephen Bowes
