= Vice Chief of the Defence Staff (Canada) =

Deputy professional head of the Canadian military

- Vice-chef d’état-major de la Défense
- Emblem of the VCDS

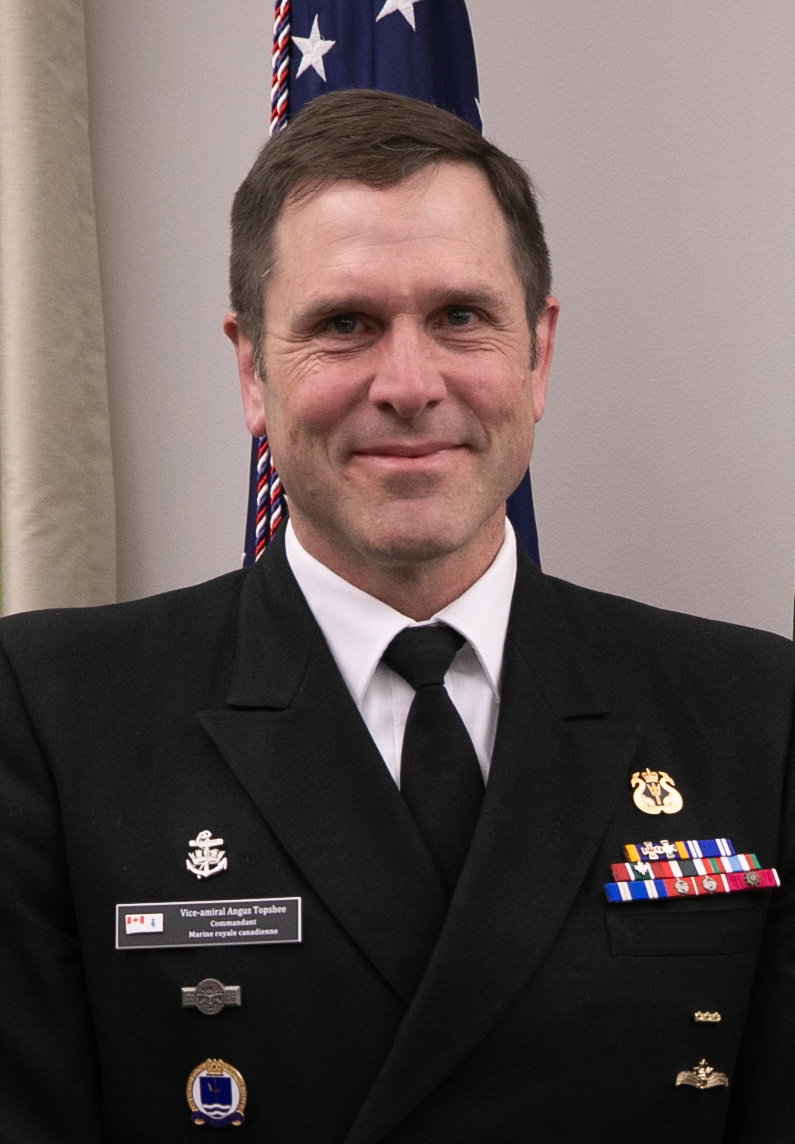
- Incumbent; Vice-Admiral Angus Topshee since 13 May 2026
- Canadian Armed Forces
- Type: Commissioned Officer
- Status: Currently constituted
- Abbreviation: VCDS
- Reports to: Chief of the Defence Staff
- Formation: 1964
- First holder: Geoffrey Walsh
- Deputy: DG Executive Coordination; Chief of Staff VCDS
- Website: Official website

Vice Chief of the Defence Staff (VCDS; French: Vice-chef d’état-major de la Défense) is the title of the second most senior member of the Canadian Armed Forces, reporting to the Chief of the Defence Staff (CDS) as well as the Deputy Minister of National Defence. The Directorate General Executive Coordination, the Canadian Forces Provost Marshal, the National Cadet and Junior Canadian Rangers Support Group and several other departments report to the VCDS, who is appointed by the CDS.

== Recent history ==
Vice-Admiral Mark Norman was temporarily relieved as VCDS on January 13, 2017, due to an ongoing investigation by the Royal Canadian Mounted Police. As a temporary replacement, Vice-Admiral Ron Lloyd was appointed the duties of VCDS on an acting basis, and he was subsequently replaced by Lieutenant-General Alain Parent on May 30, 2017.

On July 16, 2018, Lieutenant-General Paul Wynnyk was named Vice Chief of the Defence Staff. On July 9, 2019, Wynnyk announced his retirement after he claimed that the Chief of the Defence Staff, General Jonathan Vance, planned to replace him as Vice Chief of the Defence Staff with Vice-Admiral Mark Norman. Wynnyk then alleged that these plans were reversed when Vice-Admiral Norman settled with the government and retired from the military. Wynnyk was the fifth Vice Chief to serve under Vance.

On July 12, 2019, Lieutenant-General Jean-Marc Lanthier was appointed Vice Chief of the Defence Staff, effective July 18, 2019. On March 16, 2020, it was announced that Lanthier was retiring in the summer, to be replaced by Lieutenant-General Michael Rouleau.

In March 2021, it was announced that Rouleau would be succeeded by Lieutenant-General Frances J. Allen, the first woman to hold the position. On June 28, 2021, she formally assumed the role of VCDS in a ceremony at National Defence Headquarters.

== Vice Chiefs of the Defence Staff ==
No.	Portrait	Name	Took office	Left office	Time in office	Home Province	Defence branch	Appointed by	Ref.
1	Geoffrey Walsh	Lieutenant-General; Geoffrey Walsh (1909–1999)	1964	1965	0–1 years	Ontario	Canadian Army	Frank Miller	
2	Robert Moncel	Lieutenant-General; Robert Moncel (1917–2007)	1965	1966	0–1 years	Quebec	Canadian Army	Frank Miller	
3	Frederick Sharp	Lieutenant-General; Frederick Sharp (1915–1992)	1966	1969	2–3 years	Saskatchewan	Royal Canadian Air Force	Jean Allard	
4	Michael Dare	Lieutenant-General; Michael Dare (1917–1996)	September 1969	1972	2–3 years	Quebec	Canadian Army	Frederick Sharp	
5	Chester Hull	Lieutenant-General; Chester Hull (1919–2012)	1972	1974	1–2 years	Ontario	Royal Canadian Air Force	Jacques Dextraze	
6	Robert Falls	Vice-Admiral; Robert Falls (1924–2009)	1974	1977	2–3 years	Ontario	Royal Canadian Navy	Jacques Dextraze	
7	Ramsey Withers	Lieutenant-General; Ramsey Withers (1930–2014)	1977	1980	2–3 years	Ontario	Canadian Army	Robert Falls	
8	John Allan	Vice-Admiral; John Allan (1928–2014)	1980	1982	1–2 years	Ontario	Royal Canadian Navy	Ramsey Withers	
9	Gérard Charles Édouard Thériault	Lieutenant-General; Gérard Charles Édouard Thériault (1932–1998)	1982	1983	0–1 years	Quebec	Royal Canadian Air Force	Ramsey Withers	
10	Daniel Mainguy	Vice-Admiral; Daniel Mainguy (1930–2010)	1983	1985	1–2 years	British Columbia	Royal Canadian Navy	Gérard Charles Édouard Thériault	
11	Jack Vance	Lieutenant-General; Jack Vance (1933–2013)	1985	1988	2–3 years	Ontario	Canadian Army	Gérard Charles Édouard Thériault	
12	John de Chastelain	Lieutenant-General; John de Chastelain (born 1937)	1988	1989	0–1 years	Romania	Canadian Army	Paul Manson	
13	Charles Thomas	Vice-Admiral; Charles Thomas (born 1936)	1989	11 May 1991	1–2 years	British Columbia	Royal Canadian Navy	Paul Manson	
14	Fred Sutherland	Lieutenant-General; Fred Sutherland (born 1942)	1991	1992	0–1 years	Nova Scotia	Royal Canadian Air Force	John de Chastelain	
15	John Anderson	Vice-Admiral; John Anderson (born 1941)	1992	1993	0–1 years	British Columbia	Royal Canadian Navy	John de Chastelain	
16	Patrick O'Donnell	Lieutenant-General; Patrick O'Donnell (1940–2015)	1993	1995	1–2 years	Ontario	Canadian Army	John Anderson	
17	Larry Murray	Vice-Admiral; Larry Murray (born 1947)	1995	1997	1–2 years	Ontario	Royal Canadian Navy	John de Chastelain	
18	Gary Garnett	Vice-Admiral; Gary Garnett	1997	2001	3–4 years	British Columbia	Royal Canadian Navy	Maurice Baril	
19	George Macdonald	Lieutenant-General; George Macdonald	2001	2004	2–3 years	.	Royal Canadian Air Force	Raymond Henault	
20	Ronald Buck	Vice-Admiral; Ronald Buck	2004	2006	1–2 years	Quebec	Royal Canadian Navy	Raymond Henault	
21	Walter Natynczyk	Lieutenant-General; Walter Natynczyk (born 1957)	28 June 2006	15 June 2008	1 year, 353 days	Manitoba	Canadian Army	Rick Hillier	
22	Denis Rouleau	Vice-Admiral; Denis Rouleau	15 June 2008	25 July 2010	2 years, 40 days	Quebec	Royal Canadian Navy	Rick Hillier	
23	Bruce Donaldson	Vice-Admiral; Bruce Donaldson	26 July 2010	11 September 2013	3 years, 47 days	.	Royal Canadian Navy	Walter Natynczyk	
24	Guy Thibault	Lieutenant-General; Guy Thibault	11 September 2013	5 August 2016	2 years, 329 days	Quebec	Canadian Army	Thomas Lawson	
25	Mark Norman	Vice-Admiral; Mark Norman (born 1964)	5 August 2016	13 January 2017	161 days	Ontario	Royal Canadian Navy	Jonathan Vance	
-	Ron Lloyd	Vice-Admiral; Ron Lloyd (born 1963); Acting	13 January 2017	30 May 2017	137 days	.	Royal Canadian Navy	.	.
-	Alain Parent	Lieutenant-General; Alain Parent; Acting	30 May 2017	16 July 2018	1 year, 47 days	.	Royal Canadian Air Force	.	.
26	Paul Wynnyk	Lieutenant-General; Paul Wynnyk (born 1964)	16 July 2018	9 July 2019	358 days	Alberta	Canadian Army	Jonathan Vance	
27	Jean-Marc Lanthier	Lieutenant-General; Jean-Marc Lanthier	18 July 2019	15 July 2020	363 days	.	Canadian Army	Jonathan Vance	
28	Michael Rouleau	Lieutenant-General; Michael Rouleau (born 1967)	15 July 2020	14 June 2021	334 days	.	Canadian Special Operations Forces Command	Jonathan Vance	
29	Frances J. Allen	Lieutenant-General; Frances J. Allen	28 June 2021	1 August 2024	5 years, 72 days	.	Royal Canadian Air Force	Wayne Eyre (acting)	
30	Stephen Kelsey	Lieutenant-General; Stephen Kelsey	1 August 2024	13 May 2026	2 years, 38 days	.	Canadian Army	Jennie Carignan	
31	Angus Topshee	Vice-Admiral; Angus Topshee	13 May 2026	Incumbent	118 days	.	Royal Canadian Navy	Jennie Carignan	
