= Jacques Dextraze =

Canadian general (1919–1993)

Jacques Alfred Dextraze
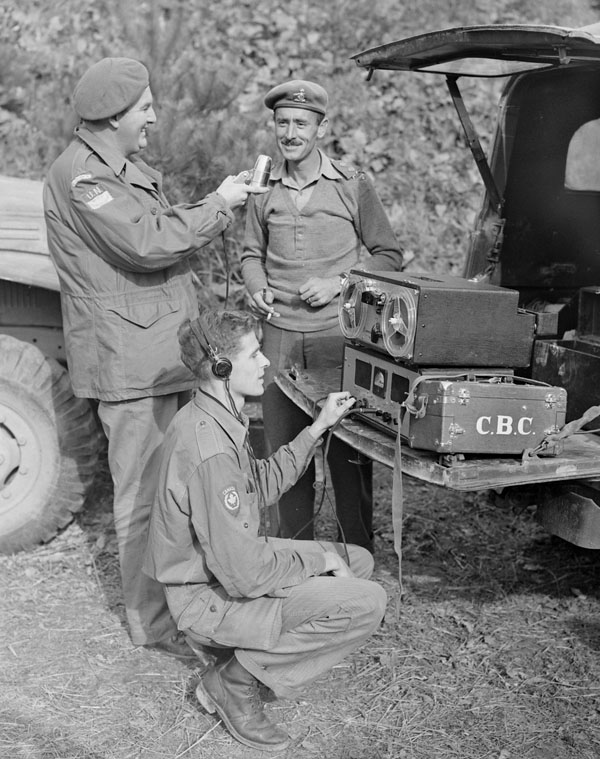
- Dextraze interviewed by a CBC War Correspondent
- Nicknames: "Mad Jimmy" "Jadex"
- Born: August 15, 1919; Montreal, Quebec
- Died: May 9, 1993 (aged 73) Montreal, Quebec
- Allegiance: Canada
- Branch: Canadian Forces Land Force Command-Canadian Forces
- Service years: 1940–1977
- Rank: General
- Commands: Chief of the Defence Staff
- Conflicts: Second World War; Korean War; Congo Crisis
- Awards: Companion of the Order of Canada; Companion of the Order of Military Merit; Commander of the Order of the British Empire; Distinguished Service Order& Bar; Knight of the Venerable Order of Saint John; Canadian Forces' Decoration
- Spouse: Frances Helena Pare
- Other work: Chairman of the Canadian National Railways

Jacques Alfred Dextraze CC CMM CBE DSO & Bar CD (August 15, 1919 – May 9, 1993) was a Canadian military officer who rose through the ranks from private to general in his career and served as Chief of the Defence Staff of Canada from 1972–1977.

== Early life ==
Born in Montreal, Quebec, the son of Alfred Dextraze and Amanda (Bond) Dextraze, he joined Les Fusiliers Mont-Royal in 1940 as a private, and was swiftly promoted through the ranks and then commissioned as lieutenant.

== Military career ==
He served in World War II in North West Europe where he was granted command of his regiment in action and was awarded two Distinguished Service Orders. In 1950 he was called back from a civilian career with the Singer sewing machine company to build, train and command the 2nd Battalion, Royal 22^{e} Régiment, leading it in the Korean War. His battalion won considerable acclaim for its stubborn stand at "Hill 355" when allied troops withdrew, leaving the "Vingt deux" surrounded but unshaken.

In 1962 he was promoted to the rank of brigadier general.

In 1963 he was the first Canadian to be chief of staff of the United Nations Operation in the Congo in Congo (Léopoldville).

The military component headquarters, coordinated by Dextraze, was in the process of planning the mission's withdrawal in early 1964 as the Simba rebellion loomed. Dextraze launched a small-scale operation during Pierre Mulele's Kwilu Province uprising of January 1964 in order to save at least some of the threatened aid workers and missionaries under attack from the jeunesse.

He also led missions to rescue a group of non-governmental organization personnel, who were hostages of Katangan rebels in the Congo. He was awarded the Commander of the Order of the British Empire for his service. He was one of Canada's most distinguished peacekeeping commanders.

In 1967 he was promoted to major general and lieutenant-general in 1968. In 1972, he was promoted to the rank of general and became Chief of Defence Staff of the Canadian Forces for an unusual period of five years.

== Civilian career ==
He retired from the Canadian Forces in 1977 and from 1977 to 1982 was chairman of the Canadian National Railway.

== Honours ==
In 1978 he was made a Companion of the Order of Canada.

Dextraze Pavilion, a dining hall at the Royal Military College Saint-Jean was named in his honour.

The General J. A. Dextraze Fitness Center at Canadian Forces College in Toronto is likewise dedicated to him.

== Family ==
In 1942, he married Frances Helena Pare. They had four sons; Richard, Jacques, Robert and John.

His son, Richard Paul Dextraze, was killed in Action (KIA) in Vietnam on April 23, 1969, where he fought as a lance corporal in the United States Marine Corps, and was a posthumous recipient of the Silver Star medal and the Purple Heart. He is interred along with his father in Notre Dame des Neiges Cemetery in Montreal, Quebec.

== Notes ==
Military offices
Preceded by F.R. Sharp	Chief of the Defence Staff; 1972-1977	Succeeded by R.H. Falls
