= United Nations Special Service Medal =

Service medal of the United Nations

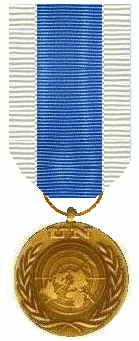
- Obverse of the UNSSM
- Type: Service medal
- Awarded for: 90 days on a peace mission for which no other medal was established
- Presented by: the United Nations
- Eligibility: Soldiers and police officers serving with UN missions
- Established: June 1995
- Ribbon bar of the medal

Precedence
- Next (higher): Varies by country
- Next (lower): Varies by country

The United Nations Special Service Medal (UNSSM) is presented to personnel with 90 days of service with a United Nations mission not covered by a specific United Nations Medal. United Nations Headquarters service is not eligible.

== Eligibility ==
The following is an incomplete listing of eligible missions which qualify for the Special Service Medal:

- United Nations Office for the Coordination of Humanitarian Affairs (UNOCHA) Peshawar 1989 to 1990
- United Nations Mine Awareness and Clearance Training Program in Pakistan and Afghanistan 1989 to 1991
- United Nations Special Commission on Iraq (UNSCOM), 180 non-consecutive days may also fulfill service requirement. April 1991 to the present
- Service with United Nations High Commissioner for Refugees (UNHCR) detachments in support of the Sarajevo Airlift or 100 landings in Sarajevo while serving as part of Operation Cheshire (United Kingdom) 1 July 1992 to 12 January 1996 or Operation Airbridge (Canada) 15 February 1992 to 31 March 1995
- Cambodian Mine Action Center (CMAC) 17 February 1994 to present
- United Nations Assistance Mission in Afghanistan (UNAMA) as part of Operation Accius November 2002 to present
- Office of the Special Representative of the Secretary General in West Africa as part of Operation Solitude since 22 March 2003.
- United Nations Advance Mission to Sudan (UNAMIS) as part of Operation Safari from July 2004 to 23 March 2005.
- United Nations Assistance Mission in Iraq, 2 October 2004 to present
- United Nations Department of Humanitarian Affairs Accelerated De-Mining Programme (MADP) in Mozambique 1995 to 2005
- United Nations Demining Programme National Institute for the Removal of Obstacles and Explosive Ordnance (INAROE) in Angola 1997-2000
- Programme for the Assistance to the Lao National Unexploded Ordnance Programme (UXOL) from 1997 to 2003
- United Nations Monitoring, Verification and Inspection Commission (UNMOVIC) in Iraq from 2002 to 2003
- United Nations Assistance Mission in Afghanistan (UNAMA) from 2004 to the present
- United Nations Assistance Mission for Iraq (UNAMI) from 2005 to the present
- United Nations Office in Timor-Leste (UNOTIL) in East Timor from 2005 to 2006
- United Nations Mine Action Coordination Centre in Southern Lebanon (UNMACC-SL) from 2007 to 2008

== Appearance ==
The UN Special Service Medal is a circular bronze medal 35 mm in diameter. The obverse depicts the official emblem of the United Nations, a world map oriented from the north pole. Above the emblem are the letters UN. The reverse is plain except for the words "In the Service of Peace" in relief. This design is common to the all United Nations Medals starting with the UNTSO Medal and the UNMOGIP Medal and follows the current convention of a common medal design with a varying ribbon.

The ribbon of the UN Special Service Medal is wide stripe of light blue, often referred to as UN Blue, with white edges.

Claps or medal bars are worn on the ribbon of the medal to denote areas of service with the country name where the service took place, or the name of the UN organization involved. Examples are a "Timor Leste" clasp for service with UNOTIL in East Timor, "Afghanistan" for service with UNAMA in Afghanistan, or "UNSCOM" for service in Iraq.

== See also ==
- International decoration
