= Meritorious Service Decoration =

Canadian decoration

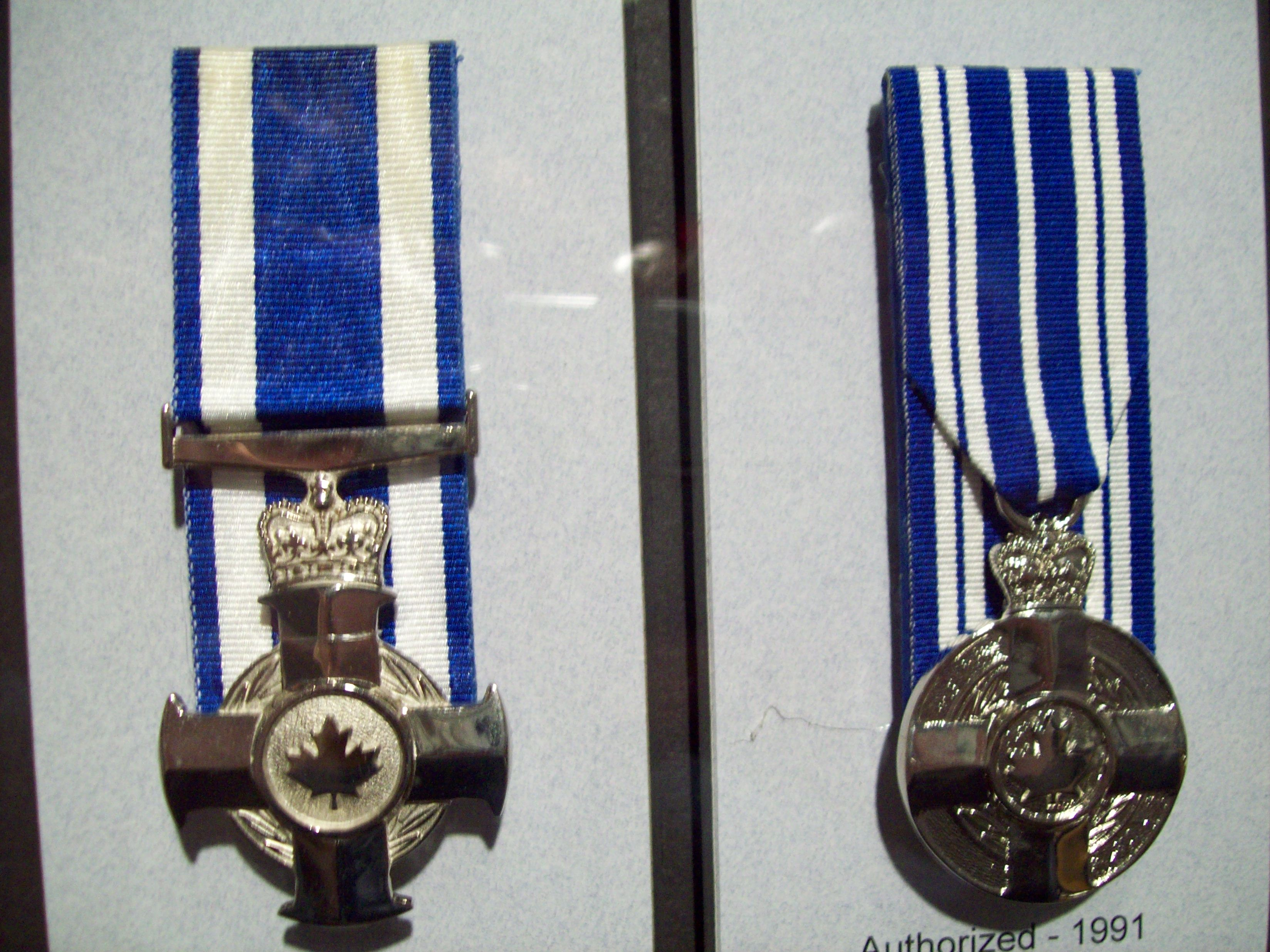
The Meritorious Service Cross, Military (left) and the Meritorious Service Medal, Civil (right).

The Meritorious Service Decorations (French: Décorations pour service méritoire) are Canadian decorations awarded to those who have demonstrated an outstanding level of service or set an exemplary standard of achievement to benefit or honour Canada. The decorations are available in two forms as the Meritorious Service Cross (Fr.: Croix du service méritoire) and the Meritorious Service Medal (Fr.: Médaille du service méritoire). The decoration, awarded to both Canadians and non-Canadians and available in both military and civilian divisions, is awarded by the reigning Canadian monarch (currently King Charles III) and presented on his behalf by the Governor General.

The military version of the Meritorious Service Cross was created in 1984. In 1991, the Meritorious Service Medal was added to the military division, and the civilian division was created for both the cross and medal.

The military division recognizes individuals for bringing honour to the Canadian Forces (CF). The civilian division recognizes contributions that bring benefit or honour to Canada in any field or improve the quality of life of a community, from athletics to diplomatic relations to humanitarian activities, setting an example for others to follow. Meritorious Service Decorations recognize the performance of a military deed or military activity in an outstandingly professional manner of such a rare, high standard that it brings considerable benefit to or reflects great credit on the CF.
