= Meritorious Service Medal (Canada) =

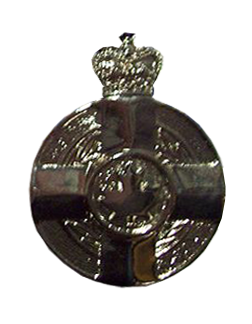
- Obverse of the medal
- Type: State decoration
- Awarded for: An action performed in an outstanding manner that brings great benefit or honour to the Canadian Forces or to Canada.
- Presented by: The monarch of Canada
- Post-nominals: MSM
- Status: Currently awarded
- Established: 6 June 1991

Highlights
- Total: 647
- Ribbon bars of the Meritorious Service Medal (MSM with bar on right); military division at top, civil division at bottom

Precedence
- Next (higher): Medal of Bravery
- Next (lower): Royal Victorian Medal

The Meritorious Service Medal (French: Médaille du service méritoire) is a decoration that is, within the Canadian system of honours, one of the two Meritorious Service Decorations gifted by the Canadian monarch, through the Governor-in-Council. Created in 1991, the medal is intended to recognize individuals—both Canadian and foreign—who have carried out meritorious acts bringing benefit and honour in either of two categories: military and civilian. Award of the medal grants recipients the use of the post-nominal letters MSM.

== Design ==
The Meritorious Service Medal, for both divisions, is in the form of a circular, silver disc with, on the obverse, a raised Greek cross, the ends splayed and rounded, a laurel wreath visible between them, and St. Edward's Crown, as a symbol of the Canadian monarch's role as the fount of honour, capping the top arm beyond the circumference of the medal. At the cross's centre is a roundel bearing a maple leaf, and on the reverse are two concentric circles, the inner one containing an etched royal cypher of the reigning monarch and Commander-in-Chief of the Canadian Forces, and the outer one engraved with the words "meritorious service méritoire".

This medallion is worn on the left chest, on a 31.8-millimetre-wide (1.25 in) blue and white ribbon; however, that for the military division has only four white stripes, paired and centred on the outer third of each side of the ribbon, while that for the civilian division has an additional 1-millimetre-wide (0.039 in) white stripe centred between the other four. For men, the cross is hung from a bar, and for women, on a ribbon bow, both pinned to the left chest. Should an individual already possessing a Meritorious Service Medal be awarded the medal again, he or she is granted a medal bar, in silver and bearing a central maple leaf, for wear on the ribbon from which the original medal is suspended.

== Eligibility and receipt ==
On 6 June 1991, Queen Elizabeth II, on the advice of her Cabinet under Prime Minister Brian Mulroney, created the Meritorious Service Medal to recognize highly professional acts that are of considerable benefit, to the Canadian Forces by military personnel, and to the nation by civilians. Any person, living or deceased, may be nominated for the medal: the military division is awarded to members of the Canadian Forces, or of any foreign military allied with Canada, and nominations come from commanding officers; the civilian division is open to both Canadians and foreigners, and nominations may be submitted by any person. In all cases, however, the event being recognized must have taken place in Canada or involved Canadian citizens.

As of August 2009, the Meritorious Service Medal has been presented to 568 people—279 in the military division and 289 in the civilian—all of whom are permitted to use the post-nominal letters MSM.

== See also ==
- Meritorious Service Cross
- Canadian order of precedence (decorations and medals)
- State decoration
