= General Campaign Star =

- Obverse and reverse of the medal (with the original version of bars)
- Type: Campaign medal
- Awarded for: Service in operations in the presence of an armed enemy.
- Presented by: Monarch of Canada
- Eligibility: All members of the Canadian Armed Forces
- Campaign: Various.
- Status: Currently awarded
- Established: 7 July 2004
- First award: 29 November 2004
- Ribbon bar for Allied Force GCS Ribbon bar for South-West Asia GCS Ribbon bar for Expedition GCS

Precedence
- Next (higher): South-West Asia Service Medal
- Next (lower): General Service Medal

The General Campaign Star (French: Étoile de campagne générale) is a campaign medal created in 2004 by the Canadian monarch-in-Council to recognize members of the Canadian Armed Forces who had directly participated in any military campaign under Canadian or allied command. It is, within the Canadian system of honours, the sixth highest of the war and operational service medals.

== Design ==
The General Campaign Star is in the form of a 44-millimetre-wide (1.7 in) four-point compass rose with, on the obverse, a wreath of maple leaves surrounding a superimposed composition of two crossed swords (representing the Canadian Army), an anchor (symbolizing the Royal Canadian Navy), and a soaring eagle (representing the Royal Canadian Air Force), all surmounted by a St. Edward's Crown, evoking the sovereign's roles as both fount of honour and Commander-in-Chief of the Canadian Armed Forces. On the reverse is a space for engraving the recipient's name and rank between the reigning monarch's royal cypher topped by another crown above and a sprig of three maple leaves below.

This medallion is worn at the left chest, suspended on a 31.8-millimetre-wide (1.25 in) ribbon coloured with vertical stripes in Canada's official colours of red and white flanking a central band in green, representing service. The accompanying medal bars are rectangular with raised edges and bear the name of the campaign for which they presented; the first is worn centred on the ribbon, while additional bars are evenly spaced and arranged in the chronological order earned, with the eldest at the bottom, closest to the medal. For wear on undress, a silver, gold or red maple leaf is pinned to the ribbon bar, denoting, respectively, the award of a second, third or fourth or subsequent bar.

== Eligibility ==
On 7 July 2004, Queen Elizabeth II, on the advice of her Cabinet under Prime Minister Paul Martin, created the General Campaign Star to recognize, without having to produce a new medal for each mission, members of the Canadian Armed Forces or allied forces who had participated in Canadian military campaigns. To qualify for the medal, individuals had to have served in a theatre of war in the presence of an armed enemy.

=== Bars ===
As with the General Service Medal, the General Campaign Star (GCS) was initially only awarded with one ribbon. Bars were to be attached to denote the area or mission which qualified for recognition; the first two bars were titled "ALLIED FORCE" and "ISAF+FIAS". In 2009, the system of bars was revised such that ribbons denoted specific theatres or services and bars recognized multiple rotations. As a result, recipients of the original GCS with the Allied Force bar remounted their medals without the bar and used the new Allied Force ribbon. Recipients of the medal with the ISAF+FIAS bar needed only to have the medal remounted without the bar on the same ribbon.

The Allied Force bar was presented to fighter pilots and AWACS crew members who flew a minimum of five sorties over Kosovo and other territories, including Albania and the Socialist Republic of Macedonia, as well as the Adriatic and Ionian Seas, during Operation Allied Force, between 24 March and 10 June 1999. For some recipients, it might have been necessary for them to return their NATO Medal before accepting the Allied Force bar.

Those in the Canadian Armed Forces who served for at least 30 days after 24 April 2003 in the International Security Assistance Force (ISAF) effort in Afghanistan were eligible to receive the ISAF bar. Those soldiers not under NATO control (such as those operating as part of the US controlled Operation Enduring Freedom) were awarded the South-West Asia Service Medal.

== See also ==
- Canadian order of precedence (decorations and medals)
- Gulf War military awards
