= Canadian Peacekeeping Service Medal =

- Obverse and reverse of the medal
- Type: Service medal
- Awarded for: A minimum of 30 days cumulative service in a UN or international peacekeeping mission.
- Presented by: The monarch of Canada
- Status: Currently awarded
- Established: 2000
- First award: 6 September 2000

Highlights
- Total recipients: 68,000
- Ribbon of the Canadian Peacekeeping Service Medal

Precedence
- Next (higher): Special Service Medal
- Next (lower): United Nations Korea Medal

The Canadian Peacekeeping Service Medal (CPSM; French: Médaille canadienne du maintien de la paix) is a service medal created on October 21, 1999, to recognize the contributions of all Canadian peacekeepers towards the ultimate goal of peace, after the United Nations Department of Peacekeeping Operations was awarded that year's Nobel Peace Prize. The inaugural presentation was made on September 6, 2000.

== History ==
In 1988, the Nobel Peace Prize was awarded to United Nations Peacekeepers, in recognition of their efforts over more than 50 years to establish and maintain peace. This act inspired the creation of the Canadian Peacekeeping Service Medal, its purpose being to recognize all Canadians, including serving and former members of the Canadian Forces, members of the Royal Canadian Mounted Police, other police services, and Canadian civilians, who contributed to peace on certain missions. Some time was involved in getting the medal to the presentation stage, but, as with the creation of any major honour or award, the approval of this award involved consultation with a large number of interested individuals.

Previously, all peacekeeping service was recognized by the Peace-Paix clasp to the Special Service Medal. Effective 21 June, 2001, all peacekeeping service is recognized by the Canadian Peacekeeping Medal, and recipients of the former award may, at their discretion, exchange it for the Peacekeeping Medal.

== Design ==
The Canadian peacekeeping Service Medal was designed by Bruce W. Beatty and is in the form of a 36 millimetres (1.4 in) diameter disc with, on the obverse, the words PEACEKEEPING • SERVICE DE LA PAIX, separated by maple leaves, surrounding a rendition of the three Canadian Peacekeeper figures that top the Peacekeeping Monument in Ottawa; one is an unarmed United Nations Military Observer, holding binoculars, the second, a woman, shoulders a radio, while the third stands guard with a rifle, and above them is a dove, the international symbol of peace. The medal's reverse shows the word CANADA below a maple leaf surrounded by a laurel wreath and bearing the Royal Cypher of Queen Elizabeth II, symbolizing her roles as both fount of honour and Commander-in-Chief of her various forces. A single-toe claw attaches the top of the medal to the centre of a slotted bar on which is another maple leaf. This medallion is worn at the left chest, suspended on a 31.8mm wide ribbon coloured with vertical stripes in the shade of blue used by the United Nations, green (representing service), and Canada's official colours: red (also indicative of blood shed in the service of peace), and white (also the colour of peace).

== Eligibility ==
The Canadian Peacekeeping Service Medal recognizes Canadian Peacekeepers deployed outside Canada for a minimum of 30 days, which includes members of the Royal Canadian Mounted Police, other police officers, and civilians who served with the forces on peacekeeping missions. As of September 2003, some 68,000 Peacekeeping Service Medals had been awarded.

== See also ==
- Canadian order of precedence (decorations and medals)
- Peace Prize Medal (Denmark)
