= Special Service Medal (Canada) =

- Obverse and reverse of the medal
- Type: Service medal
- Awarded for: Service performed under exceptional circumstances.
- Country: Canada
- Presented by: The monarch of Canada
- Eligibility: Members of the Canadian Forces
- Post-nominals: None
- Clasps: Pakistan 1989-90; Peace-Paix; Alert; NATO-OTAN; Humanitas; Ranger; Expedition
- Status: Currently awarded
- Established: 16 June 1984

Highlights
- Total: 76,749
- Ribbon bar of the medal

Precedence
- Next (higher): Operational Service Medal
- Next (lower): Canadian Peacekeeping Service Medal

The Special Service Medal (French: Médaille du service spécial) is a service medal awarded to members of the Canadian Forces. The medal was established by letters patent by Queen Elizabeth II on 16 June 1984. Recipients of this medal must have performed, "service under exceptional circumstances". The medal is always issued with a bar which specifies the special service which the medal recognizes. Each bar has its own criteria.

== Appearance ==
The medal is made of copper and zinc alloy and is circular, 36 millimetres (1.4 in) in diameter. The obverse depicts a maple leaf surrounded by a laurel wreath. The reverse contains the inscription "SPECIAL SERVICE SPÉCIAL", curving along the bottom edge of the medal. In the centre is the St Edward's Crown and Royal Cypher. A single-toed claw attaches at the top of the medal suspending it from a straight slotted bar, which hangs from the medal's ribbon.

The ribbon is 32 millimetres (1.3 in) wide. It has a dark green centre stripe flanked by white stripes, with red stripes at the edge. The white and red stripes are the same width.

The bars are sewn to the medal's ribbon. These bars are made of silver coloured metal, with a raised border and the name of the qualifying special service on a pebble textured background.

To indicate additional awards of the medal, upon the ribbon bar, a silver maple leaf is worn to indicate two awards of the medal, gold for three and a red maple leaf for four.

== Bars ==
=== Pakistan 1989-90 ===
Authorized 6 June 1991 for no less than 90 days of service attached to the United Nations Mine Awareness and Clearance Training Program in Pakistan. The qualifying period of service was from 15 March 1989 and ending on 29 July 1990. As there have been no additional qualifying periods of service, this bar is no longer eligible for award. Those who were awarded this bar may, at their discretion, exchange it for the United Nations Special Service Medal.

=== Alert ===
Authorized 26 November 1992, the Alert bar recognizes a cumulative 180 days of honourable service posted to CFS Alert. It may also recognize honourable service with a military force deployed on operations to or at CFS Alert, since the beginning of its operation on 1 September 1958 to the present.

=== Peace-Paix ===
Authorized 26 November 1992, the Peace-Paix bar recognizes 180 days of honourable service in peacekeeping operations where Canadian Forces personnel are deployed from Canada in an active capacity with, in conjunction with, or attached to an operational peacekeeping truce supervision team, observer force or similar mission. The period of eligibility begins with peacekeeping operations for the UN Temporary Commission on Korea (UNTCOK) in November 1947 and goes through the UN Mission in Haiti (UNMIH) in 1993. Other eligible peacekeeping operations were service with the International Control Commission, Commonwealth Election Commission Observer Group — Rhodesia/Zimbabwe, European Community Monitoring Mission in Yugoslavia, HMCS Restigouche on Maritime Interdiction Force Operations in the Red Sea, and the Cambodia Mine Action Centre. The medal is awarded with this bar for service that has is not recognized by another award, decoration or medal within the Canadian honours system. Effective 21 June 2001, no additional peacekeeping operations are approved for this bar. Peacekeeping service is now recognized by the Canadian Peacekeeping Service Medal.

=== NATO-OTAN ===
Authorized 26 November 1992, the NATO-OTAN bar recognizes 180 days of honourable service with NATO since its establishment on 1 January 1951 through 19 October 2004. Qualifying service is defined as being posted with a NATO unit, or to an allied unit or Canadian Forces unit beyond the territorial borders of Canada serving under the command of a NATO headquarters, or in Canada on a military staff directly participating in the operational control of NATO or allied units for operations or exercises. Those personnel with service within Canada must have directly served in an operations centre. Personnel in eligible postings or on operations on 19 October 2004 were able to count their service through the end of that deployment, posting or operation. Time served in Europe or at sea cannot all apply towards this bar.

For NATO service since 20 October 2004 the same 180 days of cumulative service applies as part of, or in directly supporting NATO operations and missions. Service that can be recognized by a NATO Medal is not eligible. Eligibility is limited to a few specific missions:

- Service deployed aboard ships serving with the NATO Standing Naval Force Atlantic, previously known as Standing Naval Force Atlantic (STANAVFORLANT), during Operation Sextant on 1 January 2006
- Canadian aircrew flying surveillance sorties for NATO beyond Canadian airspace.
- Service with the Canadian Contingent NATO Airborne Early Warning Force, Geilenkirchen, Germany.
- Service supporting Operation Active Endeavour (Canadian Operation Sirius)
- Service attached to a NATO Forward Logistics Site (FLS)
- Service with Operation Reassurance in Latvia

=== NATO service from 2004 to the present ===
An aggregate of 45 days of honourable service performed in approved locations or tasks outside Canada beginning on or after 20 October 2004 as part, or in direct support, of NATO operations or mission provided the service in question is not recognized by another medal. See link to eligibility list above.

Service in NATO transformation establishments, schools and colleges, NATO training, exercises and conferences, as well as other similar service not in direct support of NATO Ops remains excluded from eligibility.

Personnel who have eligible service under the 1951 - 2004 criteria but did not meet the 180 day criteria, and also have eligible service under the 2004 – onward criteria, shall be allowed to combine all the eligible days of service towards the minimum of 45 cumulative days of eligible service criteria.

Multiplying factors no longer exist.

=== Humanitas ===
Authorized 9 March 1993, the Humanitas bar recognizes a cumulative 30 days of honourable service outside Canada supporting humanitarian operations since 11 June 1984. These operations, such as rescue, relief and reconstruction operations are conducted in response to disasters and human conflict. Service that is recognized by another Canadian honour is not eligible for the Humanitas bar. The Humanitas bar is no longer awarded. Effective 31 July 2009, eligible humanitarian service is now counted towards the HUMANITAS Operational Service Medal.

=== Ranger ===
Authorized 1 October 1999, the Ranger bar recognizes four years of cumulative honourable service with the Canadian Rangers. Rangers provide a military presence in Canada's sparsely settled isolated northern coastal areas. Rangers may perform duties as varied as reporting unusual activity or compiling information specific to their locality which may be useful for military operations. They may also be called upon to provide local expertise, assistance or advice, to guide military search and rescue activities. To be eligible Rangers must also complete at least three Ranger Patrol Exercises.

=== Jugoslavija ===
The Jugoslavija bar was authorized on 9 March 1993 for a minimum of 90 days of honourable service with the European Community Monitor Mission in Yugoslavia (ECMMY). Periods of qualifying service were from 4 September 1991 until the end of the mission. This bar was never issued, instead being superseded by the European Community Monitor Mission Medal.

=== Expedition ===
The Expedition bar was authorized on 21 May 2014 for service dating back to 1 July 2007. Eligible service is an aggregate of 45 days of honourable service performed outside Canada beginning July 1, 2007, while deployed to participate in or provide direct support on a full-time basis to approved operations, provided the said service is not counted towards any other Canadian or foreign service medal. In this context, “deployed” means sent outside of Canada temporarily, without family and effects, for the specific purpose of serving in or supporting approved operations; postings to permanent positions outside of Canada are excluded from eligibility. The following are some examples of approved operations:

- Service in Operation Caribbe at Comalapa, El Salvador, Curacao, and Key West, in direct support of the Joint Interagency Task Force South mission since 1 July 2007.
- Service as a staff member at the Third Location Decompression Site, Cyprus, since 1 August 2007.
- Service with the Integrated Under Sea Surveillance Towed Array Sensor System while deployed on US Navy ships performing surveillance in the South China, East China, and Yellow Seas as well as parts of the Sea of Japan from the Paracel Islands to Vladivostok since 1 December 2007.
- Service with the Casualty Support Team, Landstuhl Regional Medical Center, from 11 February 2008 to 29 March 2014.
- Service with NAVCENT, Naval Support Activity Bahrain, including but not limited to: Combined Maritime Force Headquarters, since 21 April 2010; 5th Fleet Headquarters, since 31 Jul 2012; Coalition Intelligence Fusion Centre, since 21 May 2014; NAVCENT Liaison Officer since 21 May 2014.
- Service at the Strategic Lines of Communications Detachments in Germany since 1 October 2010, Cyprus since 21 October 2010, and Kuwait since 2 June 2011.
- Service with US Forces in Kuwait in direct support of Operation New Dawn providing advice and assisting with the transition from the Department of Defense to the State Department as well as assisting with the withdrawal of U.S. troops from Iraq, from 1 February to 31 December 2011.
- Service with Task Force Jamaica on Operation Jaguar within the political boundaries, territorial waters, and airspace of Jamaica, in support to the Jamaica Defence Force providing SAR and Medevac capability and to stand by for possible hurricanes, from 12 August to 15 November 2011 (Op Jaguar).
- Service with Air Task Force Mali in support of Operation Serval from Istres-Le Tubé Air Base, France from 15 January to 3 April 2013.
- Service with USCENTCOM Forward–Jordan, King Abdullah Special Operations Training Centre, Amman, Jordan, since 23 May 2013.
- Service with Operation Presence - Support of Task Force Mali for personnel stationed in Dakar, Senegal for theater activation and mission support since 01 June 2018.
- Service with Operation Unifier for personnel supporting the bolstering of the Armed Forces of Ukraine, in Ukraine from 14 April 2015 to February 2022, the United Kingdom since August 2022, and in Poland from October 2022 to March 2023.

=== Distantia ===
The Distantia bar was established 10 December 2024 to recognize those who have a direct impact in operations from a remote location through the use of technology. Eligible service is 180 consecutive days or an aggregate of 270 days, 60 of which must be consecutive, beginning on or after 5 November 2024. Work may be performed inside or outside Canada, but not in a theatre of operations, for the purpose of remotely participating in approved operations in approved roles such as unmanned aerial vehicle operator.

Service cannot be counted towards any other Canadian or foreign award.

Approved operations include: Op ARTEMIS, Op HORIZON, Op IMPACT, Op NEON, Op PRESENCE, Op PROJECTION, Op REASSURANCE, Op UNIFIER and Op UNION.
