= Order of Military Merit (Canada) =

Canadian military honor

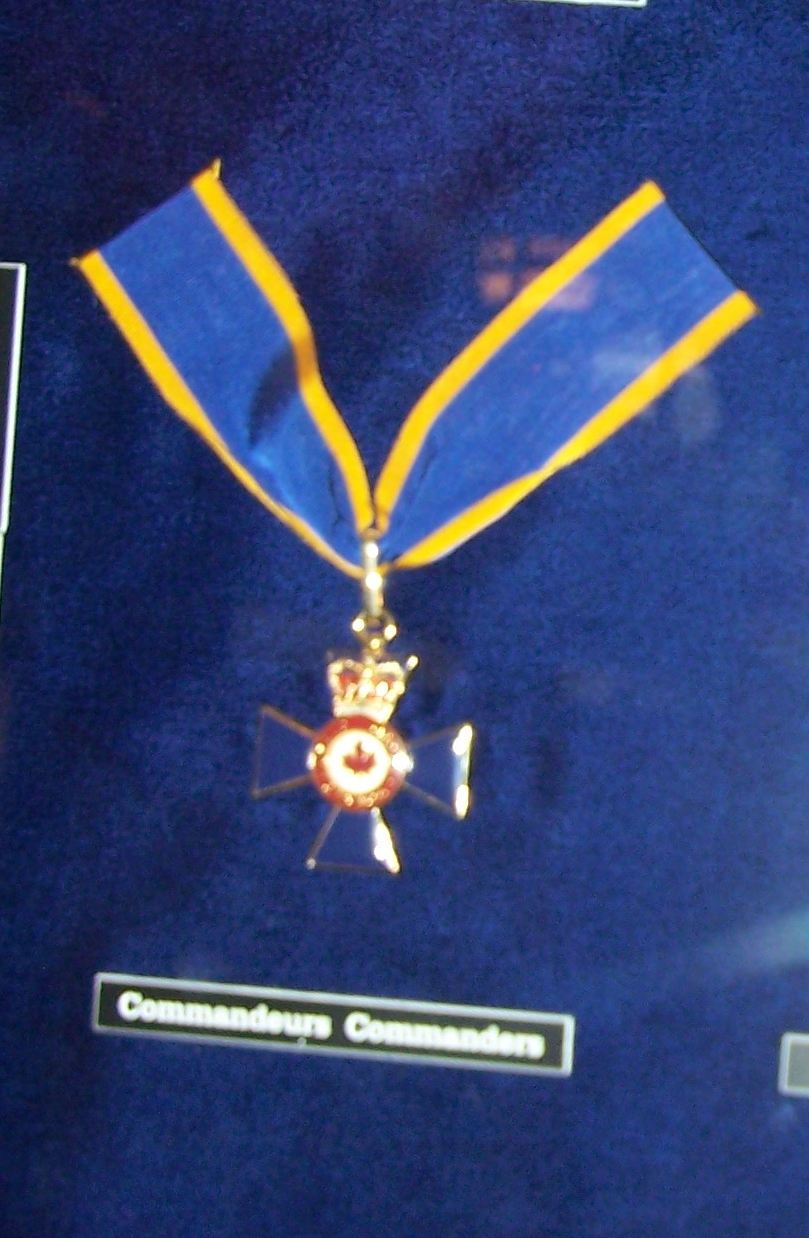
- Commander's badge and neck ribbon

Awarded by Governor general of Canada
- Type: National order
- Established: 1 July 1972
- Motto: Officium ante commodum (Latin for 'Service before self')
- Eligibility: Standing membership in the Canadian Forces
- Criteria: Conspicuous merit and exceptional service
- Status: Currently constituted
- Founder: Elizabeth II
- Sovereign: Charles III
- Chancellor: Governor general of Canada
- Principal Commander: Chief of the Defence Staff
- Grades: Commander (CMM); Officer (OMM); Member (MMM)

Statistics
- Total inductees: 5,285

Precedence
- Next (higher): Dependent on grade
- Next (lower): Dependent on grade

The Order of Military Merit (French: Ordre du mérite militaire) is a military honour for merit that is, within the Canadian system of honours, the second highest order administered by the Governor in Council (Note: The Order of Canada and the Order of Merit are civilian honours for merit, while the Cross of Valour and Victoria Cross are decorations for bravery.) on behalf of the Canadian monarch.

Created in 1972 to replace a grouping within the Order of Canada, the order was established to recognize members of the Canadian Forces—either regular or reserve personnel—who have demonstrated dedication and devotion beyond the call of duty, achieving conspicuous merit and exceptional military service. The three tiers of the order are Commander, Officer, and Member; deserving non-Canadians may also receive honorary appointments to the order.

== Grades and precedence ==
The Canadian monarch—at present King Charles III—is seen as the fount of honour and is thus at the apex of the Order of Military Merit as its sovereign, (Note: In royal proclamations issued by the King or in his name, the order is thus referred to as "Our Order of Military Merit".) followed by the governor general of Canada who serves as the fellowship's chancellor, and the chief of the Defence Staff who is the principal commander. Thereafter follow three grades—each having accordant post-nominal letters that are the same in both English and French. Additionally, any governor general, former governor general, or member of the Canadian Royal Family in the Canadian Forces may be appointed as an extraordinary commander, officer, or member. There are no limits to the population of any grade, and promotions are possible, though this is ordinarily not done within five years of the initial appointment. Any person thus honoured must return their lower grade insignia, as no member may at any time hold more than one appointment in the organization. Further, within the order of precedence for Canadian honours, each grade of the Order of Military Merit precedes a similar grade of the Order of Merit of the Police Forces, with commanders succeeding the members of the Order of Canada.

Grades of the Order of Military Merit
Grade	Post-nominal letters	Ribbon	Recognizing	Preceding	Succeeding
Commander (French: Commandeur)	CMM		Outstanding meritorious service and demonstrated leadership in duties of great responsibility. As of August 2009, there were 211 living Commanders of the order.	Member of the Order of Canada (CM)	Commander of the Order of Merit of the Police Forces (COM)
Officer (French: Officier)	OMM		Outstanding meritorious service in duties of responsibility. As of August 2009, there were 1,021 living Officers of the order.	Commander of the Royal Victorian Order (CVO)	Officer of the Order of Merit of the Police Forces (OOM)
Member (French: Membre)	MMM		Exceptional service or performance of duty. As of August 2009, there were 2,436 living Members of the order.	Lieutenant of the Royal Victorian Order (LVO)	Member of the Order of Merit of the Police Forces (MOM)

== Insignia ==
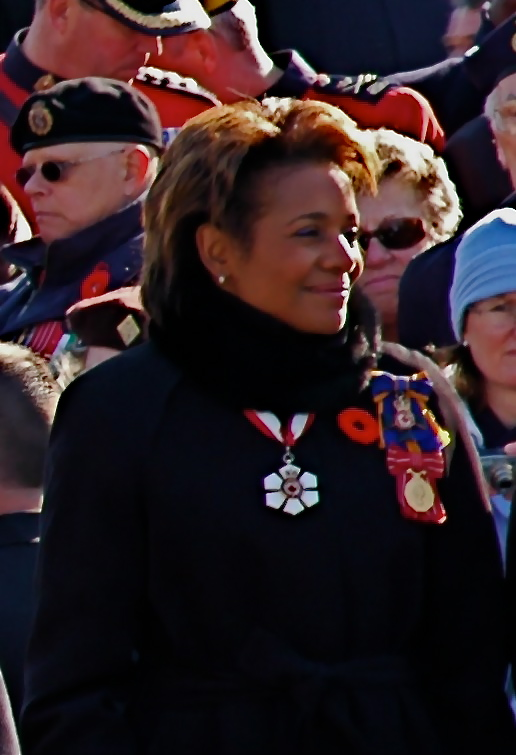
Governor General Michaëlle Jean wearing the Commander's insignia as a brooch, top on her left shoulder, at Remembrance Day ceremonies in Ottawa, 2007

Upon admission into the Order of Military Merit, members are presented the appropriate insignia, though these remain property of the Crown. The Sovereign's insignia is a jewelled, 18-carat gold crown of rubies, emeralds, and sapphires, from which is suspended a blue enamelled cross pattée with four equal arms and three diamonds between each. At the centre is a disc bearing a maple leaf in pavé-laid rubies on a white enamel background, surrounded at its edge by a red enamel ring (annulus) bearing the words "merit • mérite • Canada". The Chancellor wears the badge of a Commander, though is also, upon installation as governor general, granted a livery collar for wear at Order of Military Merit investiture ceremonies; this is composed of a series of gold medallions, and supports an enamel rendition of the shield of the Royal Arms of Canada, from which the governor general's badge is suspended.

The badges for inductees are of a similar design to the sovereign's badge, though without precious stones, and slight differences for each grade. For Commanders, the emblem is gilt with a red enamel maple leaf in the gold central disk; for Officers, it is gilt with a gold maple leaf; and for Members, both the badge itself and the maple leaf are silver. The reverse bears only a serial number, and all are topped by a St. Edward's Crown, symbolizing that the order is headed by the sovereign. These insignia are worn with the order's ribbon, which is blue with golden edges. Commanders wear the badge at the neck while Officers and Members display theirs on the left breast on a medal bar, suspended by, respectively, a bar of gold or silver decorated with a laurel motif. Women in civilian dress may wear their emblems on a ribbon bow pinned at the left chest. The ribbon bar, worn for undress, is the same for each grade, save for a miniature blue cross pattée with a maple leaf, the colour of which matches that on the badge of the grade that the wearer was appointed to; someone who has been promoted within the order may wear on their ribbon bar the pins of all grades that they have occupied. These same miniatures also serve as a lapel pin for civilian wear.

With the patriation in 1988 of oversight of coats of arms to the Canadian Heraldic Authority, the constitution of the Order of Military Merit was amended to include the entitlement of all inductees to petition the Chief Herald of Canada for personal armorial bearings, should they not already possess any. Commanders may receive supporters, and all members may have the escutcheon (shield) of their arms encircled with a blue ribbon bearing the order's motto – officium ante commodum (Latin for 'service before self') – in gold, and from which is suspended a rendition of the holder's Order of Military Merit badge.

== Eligibility and appointment ==
For military ranks of colonel and above, recommendations for appointment to the Order of Military Merit are made by a commanding officer or military advisory committee to the chief of the Defence Staff, who then forwards the name or names to the governor general; per the Queen's Regulations and Orders for the Canadian Forces, neither the nominee, nor any member of their family, can be notified or otherwise made aware that they have been suggested for induction into the order. Nominations are processed by the Advisory Committee for the Order of Military Merit, which is a part of the Chancellery of Honours at Rideau Hall, and has six members: one appointed by the governor general, four by the chief of the Defence Staff, and the chief of the Defence Staff him or herself; the secretary to the Governor General is Secretary General of the Order of Military Merit.

Appointments take place annually and are limited to 0.1% of the previous year's total population of the Canadian Forces, including reserves; for example, the 60th list included 111 appointments in 2010. Submissions for appointments must be representative of the whole of the Canadian Forces population and nominators are advised that appointments are not necessarily commensurate with senior rank and long service. Many outstanding master sailors, petty officers, and lieutenants are as deserving as senior officers and non-commissioned members. The level of Member is generally reserved for non-commissioned members of the forces, petty officers, and commissioned officers up to the rank of army or air force captain or navy lieutenant, while no more than six percent of those appointed to the order in total may be inducted as Commanders, and no more than 30% may be made Officers. Appointments are also not made posthumously, though members of foreign armed forces can be admitted as honorary members in any grade. A total of 5,285 appointments and promotions to the order have been made in the fifty years from its inception in 1972 to 2022; 300 Commanders, 1,377 Officers and 3,608 members.

== Removal ==
The Governor General may, by ordinance, remove someone from the Order.

On December 22, 2014, the membership of Lieutenant-Colonel Deborah Miller was terminated by Governor General David Johnston in light of military disciplinary action Miller faced for wearing medals and military insignia she did not earn.

On March 3, 2017, retired Warrant Officer Richard Fancy was removed from the rolls after a court martial found that he had worn medals to which he was not entitled.

On November 22, 2018, retired Master Warrant Officer William Edward Lang, appointed to the Order in 2016, was removed from the rolls at his request.

On February 3, 2021 retired Captain Jean-Charles Perreault, appointed to the Order in 1995, was removed from the rolls after wearing medals to which he was not entitled.

On April 20, 2022, retired General Jonathan Vance, appointed to the Order in 2010, was removed from the rolls at his request.

== See also ==
- Meritorious Service Decoration
