= Operational Service Medal =

Operational Service Medal may refer to:

- Operational Service Medal (Canada), a campaign medal established in 2010
- Operational Service Medal (United Kingdom), the overall name given to a group of campaign medals awarded to the British Armed Forces:
  - Operational Service Medal for Afghanistan
  - Operational Service Medal for the Democratic Republic of Congo
  - Operational Service Medal for Sierra Leone
  - Operational Service Medal Iraq and Syria
- Australian Operational Service Medal, a campaign medal established in 2012
- New Zealand Operational Service Medal, a campaign medal established in 2002
- International Operational Service Medal, a military decoration awarded since 2016 by the Government of Ireland
- Operational Service Medal (Bermuda), a medal established for members of the Royal Bermuda Regiment in 2025
