= Kevin Hurley =

British politician and police officer (born 1953)

Major Kevin Hurley TD

Surrey Police and Crime Commissioner
- In office 22 November 2012 – 11 May 2016
- Preceded by: Office created
- Succeeded by: David Munro

Personal details
- Born: September 1953 (age 73)
- Party: Zero Tolerance Policing ex Chief
- Education: University of Manchester

Military service
- Allegiance: United Kingdom
- Branch/service: Parachute Regiment; Royal Military Police
- Years of service: 1971–2011
- Rank: Major
- Battles/wars: Iraq War
- Awards: Iraq Medal; Iraq Reconstruction Service Medal; Efficiency Decoration (Territorial); Police Long Service and Good Conduct Medal; Queen Elizabeth II Golden Jubilee Medal; Volunteer Reserves Service Medal; Civilian Service Medal (Afghanistan)

Kevin Barry Hurley, TD (born September 1953) is a British politician and former police officer. He was the Surrey Police and Crime Commissioner between November 2012 and May 2016. He previously served in the Metropolitan Police, reaching the rank of Detective Chief Superintendent. He was also an officer of the Territorial Army, serving first in the Parachute Regiment and then in the Royal Military Police.

== Early life ==
Hurley attended St Mary's primary school in Eltham from 1959 to 1965. He then went to St. Joseph's Academy in Blackheath, South London from 1965 to 1972. He studied at the Victoria University of Manchester from 1972 to 1976. He graduated with a Bachelor of Science degree (BSc) in Civil Engineering.

== Career ==
=== Military service ===
On 16 January 1974, Hurley was commissioned into Section B of the Territorial and Army Volunteer Reserve as a second lieutenant (on probation). He was given the service number 497343. Section B is the non-deployable category of reserves.

On 1 June 1974, he transferred to the Parachute Regiment, Territorial and Army Volunteer Reserve, with seniority in the rank of second lieutenant (on probation) from 16 January 1974. He joined 4 PARA and his commission was confirmed. He was promoted to lieutenant on 1 June 1976, and to acting captain on 8 April 1978. On 1 January 1980, he transferred to the Regular Army Reserve of Officers in the rank of lieutenant. This ended his first period of active reserve service.

On 18 November 1985, he transferred to the Royal Military Police, Territorial Army, as a lieutenant with seniority in that rank from 17 April 1982. He was promoted to Captain on 1 July 1986, and to Major on 1 May 1989 with seniority in that rank from 15 May 1988. On 1 April 1991, he transferred to the Regular Army Reserve of Officers in the rank of Major. This ended his second period of active reserve service.

On 1 February 1993, he transferred once more to the Royal Military Police, Territorial Army, as a Major with seniority from 2 March 1991. He was mobilised for the 2003 invasion of Iraq. He first served as the CBRN advisor to Brigadier Jacko Page, the commander of 16 Air Assault Brigade.

=== Police ===
Hurley served in the Metropolitan Police from 1979 to 2011, when he retired with the rank of Detective Chief Superintendent, having served in his last three years as Borough Commander for Hammersmith and Fulham. From 2001 to 2005 he was the Head of the Counter Terrorism and Public Order Department for the City of London Police.

In 2006 while Chief Superintendent, Hurley gave a speech at the opening of the Church of Scientology's London headquarters, where he described the group as a "force for good" that were "raising the spiritual wealth of society:.

=== Politics ===
Hurley sought the nomination as Conservative Party candidate for Police and Crime Commissioner of Surrey Police in the 2012 Police and Crime Commissioner elections. However, he was defeated in the selection process by Julie Iles. He stood as an independent, appearing on the ballot paper as the "Zero Tolerance Policing ex Chief" candidate, a registered political party in the United Kingdom of which he is the leader. On 15 November 2012, he won the election with a majority of 7,725.

During his term as PCC Hurley became involved in a public dispute with his then Chief Constable, Lynne Owens, following an external report which criticised Surrey Police for failings around organised crime and child protection. Upon Owens' appointment as Director-General of the National Crime Agency he clashed with the Home Secretary, Theresa May, over his criticism of Owens. Hurley demanded an apology after May described his "attacks" on Owens as one of a "number of incidents" which had given PCCs a bad name.

In 2016 Hurley gained national attention for saying he wanted to "batter and break the legs" of a man convicted of a stabbing.

In the 2016 England and Wales PCC elections, Hurley's party, Zero Tolerance Policing ex Chief, stood candidates in the Surrey, Hampshire and Essex police authorities with Hurley himself standing for re-election in Surrey.

None of the party's candidates were elected and Hurley was defeated by David Munro in the second round of vote counting.

== Honours and decorations ==
Hurley was awarded the Efficiency Decoration (Territorial) (TD) in November 1997. He was awarded the Volunteer Reserves Service Medal in November 2005, and was awarded a clasp to the medal in April 2011. He was awarded the Civilian Service Medal (Afghanistan) in April 2019.

Iraq Medal	(2003)
Iraq Reconstruction Service Medal	(2004)
Queen Elizabeth II Golden Jubilee Medal	(2002)
Police Long Service and Good Conduct Medal	
Efficiency Decoration (Territorial)	(1997)
Volunteer Reserves Service Medal	(2005); Clasp 2011
Civilian Service Medal (Afghanistan)	(2019)
