= Operational Service Medal for Sierra Leone =

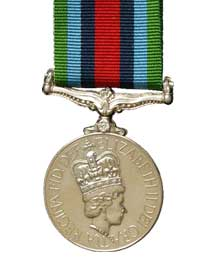
- Operational Service Medal for Sierra Leone
- Type: Military Campaign Medal
- Awarded for: Campaign service
- Description: Silver disk, 36mm diameter.
- Presented by: United Kingdom
- Eligibility: Members of the United Kingdom armed forces
- Campaign(s): Sierra Leone 2000–02
- Clasps: Nil issued
- Established: 2002
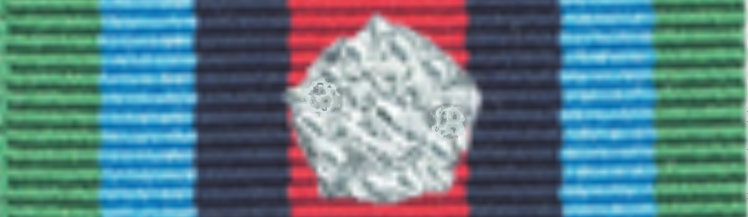
- Ribbon bar With rosette for Operations Barras and Maidenley

The Operational Service Medal for Sierra Leone is a campaign medal established in 2000 by the Ministry of Defence of the United Kingdom for participation in the British military intervention during and after the Sierra Leone Civil War, from May 2000 to July 2002.

== Operational Service Medal ==
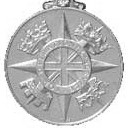
Common reverse of the OSM

The Operational Service Medal (OSM) was established in 1999 to replace the General Service Medal (1962) for all new operations. A separate medal of the same design is awarded for each campaign, differentiated by a distinct ribbon. It has been awarded for four separate campaigns:

- Afghanistan (from 11 September 2001)
- Sierra Leone (May 2000 – July 2002)
- Democratic Republic of Congo (June – September 2003)
- Iraq and Syria (Dates to be confirmed)

From 2008, British service personnel could receive the General Service Medal (2008) for participation in smaller operations that do not justify the award of the Operational Service Medal.

== Medal ==
The Operational Service Medal for Sierra Leone is silver and circular in shape.
The obverse shows the crowned effigy of Queen Elizabeth II with the inscription ELIZABETH II DEI GRATIA REGINA FID. DEF.
The reverse bears the Union Flag, surrounded by the inscription FOR OPERATIONAL SERVICE and the four major points of the compass with, between the points, four Coronets: Royal (top left), Naval (top right), Mural (Army, bottom left), and Astral (RAF, bottom right).

=== Clasp ===
No clasp was issued. A large South Atlantic Medal type silver rosette is worn on the medal for operational service within Sierra Leone during Operations Maidenly and Barras. A smaller rosette is worn on the ribbon bar.

== Ribbon ==
The ribbon consists of a broad central red stripe, flanked each side by a stripe of navy blue and one of light blue, to represent the three services, with an outer stripe of green to reflect the jungle landscape of Sierra Leone.

== Qualifying criteria ==
The length of service to qualify for the medal is determined by the mission participated in:

- 1 day of service on Operations Barras or Maidenley
- 14 days continuous or accumulated service on Operation Palliser
- 30 days continuous or accumulated service on Operations Basilica or Silkman

The precise dates of each operation varied, but all were within the period 5 May 2000 to 31 July 2002.

The medal was also awarded for service in the wider Joint Operational Area which included Senegal, Gibraltar and offshore support ships such as RFA Argus.

There is no minimum qualifying period for those decorated for operational service (including a mention in despatches and a Queen’s Commendation), while the period could be reduced for those killed or wounded on operations.

Qualifying service for the Operational Service Medal counts towards the period required to receive the Accumulated Campaign Service Medal.

British forces serving with United Nations peace keeping missions in Sierra Leone did not qualify for the Operational Service Medal, but instead received the United Nations Medal with the ribbon for either UNOMSIL (1 June 1998 to 30 September 1999) or UNAMSIL (from 1 October 1999).

== See also ==
- Operational Service Medal for Afghanistan
- Operational Service Medal for the Democratic Republic of Congo
- United Nations Medal (for UNOMSIL and UNAMSIL missions)
- Operational Service Medal Iraq and Syria
