= Operational Service Medal for the Democratic Republic of Congo =

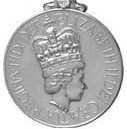
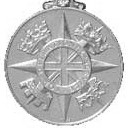
- Operational Service Medal, obverse and reverse
- Type: Military Campaign Medal
- Awarded for: Campaign service
- Description: Silver disk, 36 mm diameter.
- Presented by: United Kingdom
- Eligibility: Members of the United Kingdom armed forces
- Campaign(s): Democratic Republic of Congo, 2003
- Clasps: DROC
- Established: 2005
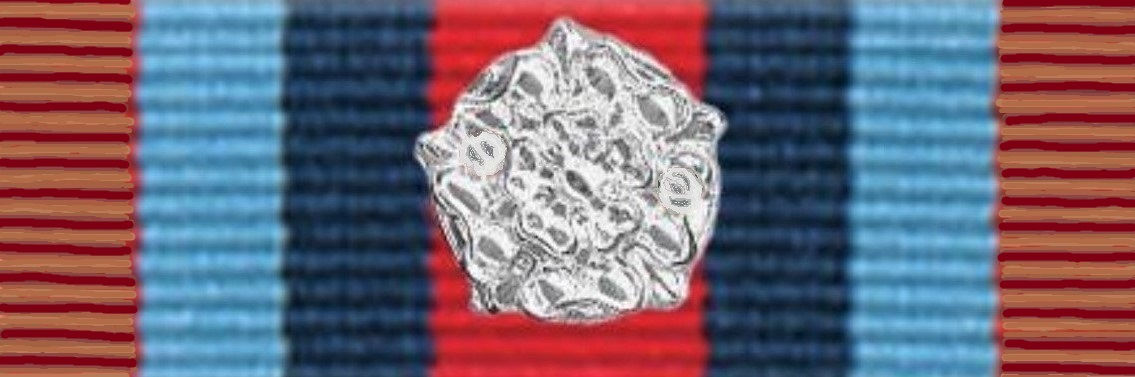
- Ribbon bar Silver rosette signifies award of the DROC clasp

The Operational Service Medal for the Democratic Republic of the Congo is a British armed forces campaign medal, awarded mostly to military personnel who served between 14 June and 10 September 2003 on Operation Coral.

== Operational Service Medal ==
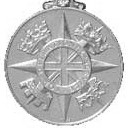
Common reverse of the OSM

The Operational Service Medal (OSM) was established in 1999 to replace the General Service Medal (1962) for all new operations. A separate medal of the same design is awarded for each campaign, differentiated by a distinct ribbon. It has been awarded for four separate campaigns:

- Afghanistan (from 11 September 2001)
- Sierra Leone (May 2000 – July 2002)
- Democratic Republic of Congo (June – September 2003)
- Iraq and Syria (Dates to be confirmed)

From 2008, British service personnel could receive the General Service Medal (2008) for participation in smaller operations that do not justify the award of the Operational Service Medal.

== Medal ==
The Operational Service Medal for the Democratic Republic of Congo is silver and circular in shape.

- Obverse: the crowned effigy of Queen Elizabeth II with the inscription ELIZABETH II DEI GRATIA REGINA FID. DEF.
- Reverse: the Union Flag, surrounded by the inscription FOR OPERATIONAL SERVICE and the four major points of the compass with, between the points, four Coronets: Royal (top left), Naval (top right), Mural-Army (bottom left), and Astral-Royal Air Force (bottom right).
- Ribbon: a broad central red stripe, flanked each side by a stripe of navy blue and one of light blue, to represent the three services, with an outer stripe of ochre, to represent the Congolese landscape.
- Clasp: DROC clasp awarded with every medal. A silver rosette denotes the clasp when worn on the ribbon bar.

== Qualifying criteria ==
The medal with clasp is awarded for 25 days continuous service in Bunia in the Ituri Province of the Congo, or five return operational flights between Entebbe and Bunia, between 14 June and 10 September 2003 on Operation Coral.

There is no minimum qualifying period for those killed, wounded or disabled during operations, or where a recipient is decorated for operational service (including a mention in dispatches and a Queen’s Commendation).

Qualifying service for the Operational Service Medal counts towards the period required to receive the Accumulated Campaign Service Medal.

British military personnel serving with United Nations forces in the Congo from 30 November 1999 for 90 days as part of the MONUC or MONUSCO missions are entitled to wear the United Nations Medal with the appropriate ribbon.

== See also ==
- Operational Service Medal for Afghanistan
- Operational Service Medal for Sierra Leone
- United Nations Medal, for MONUC (1999–2010) and MONUSCO (from 2010) missions.
- Operational Service Medal Iraq and Syria
