= Operational Service Medal for Afghanistan =

Operational Service Medal - Afghanistan
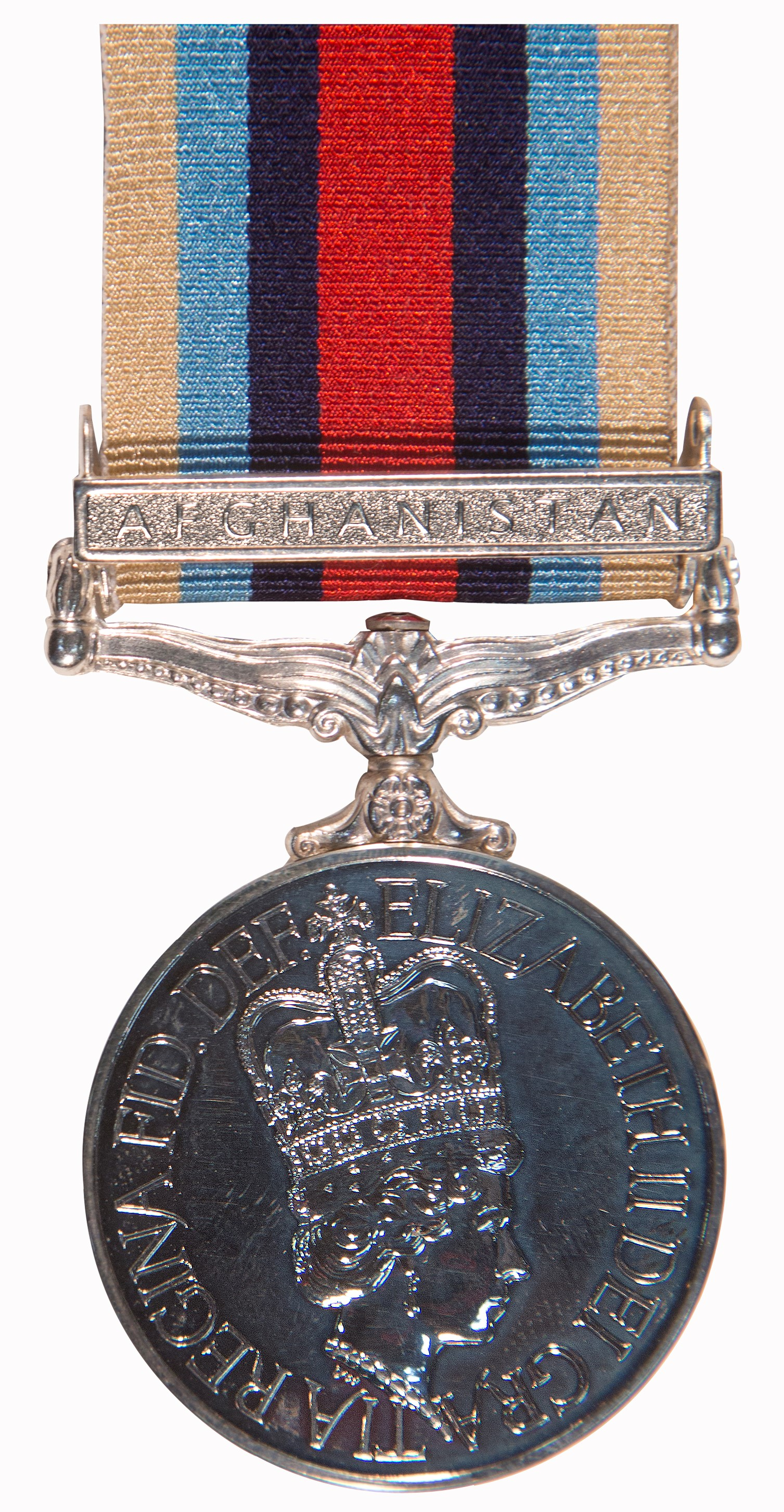
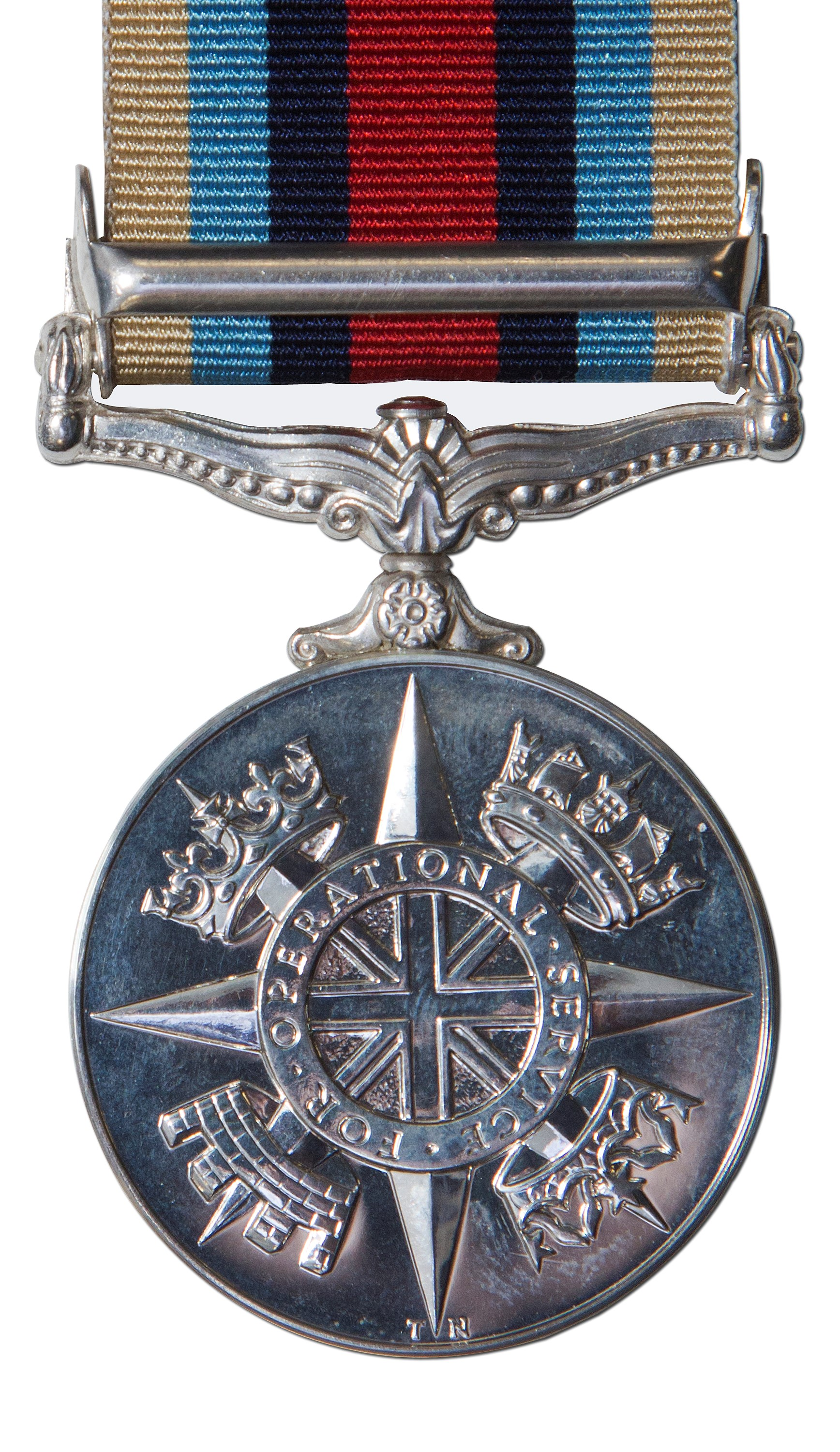
- Operational Service Medal for Afghanistan
- Type: Military Campaign Medal
- Awarded for: Campaign service
- Description: Silver disk, 36mm diameter
- Presented by: the United Kingdom
- Eligibility: Members of the United Kingdom armed forces
- Campaign: Afghanistan 2001 to 2021
- Clasps: Afghanistan; Operation Pitting
- Status: No longer awarded
- Established: 2003
- Ribbon bar Silver rosette signifies award of a clasp

The Operational Service Medal for Afghanistan was a campaign medal awarded by the Ministry of Defence of the United Kingdom for service by British Armed Forces personnel in support of the post-2001 Afghan War.

== Operational Service Medal ==
The Operational Service Medal (OSM) was established in 1999 to replace the General Service Medal (1962) for all new operations. A separate medal of the same design is awarded for each campaign, differentiated by a distinct ribbon. It has been awarded for four separate campaigns:

- Afghanistan (September 2001 – August 2021)
- Sierra Leone (May 2000 – July 2002)
- Democratic Republic of Congo (June – September 2003)
- Iraq and Syria (Dates to be confirmed)

From 2008, British service personnel could receive the General Service Medal (2008) for participation in smaller operations that do not justify the award of the Operational Service Medal.

== Medal ==
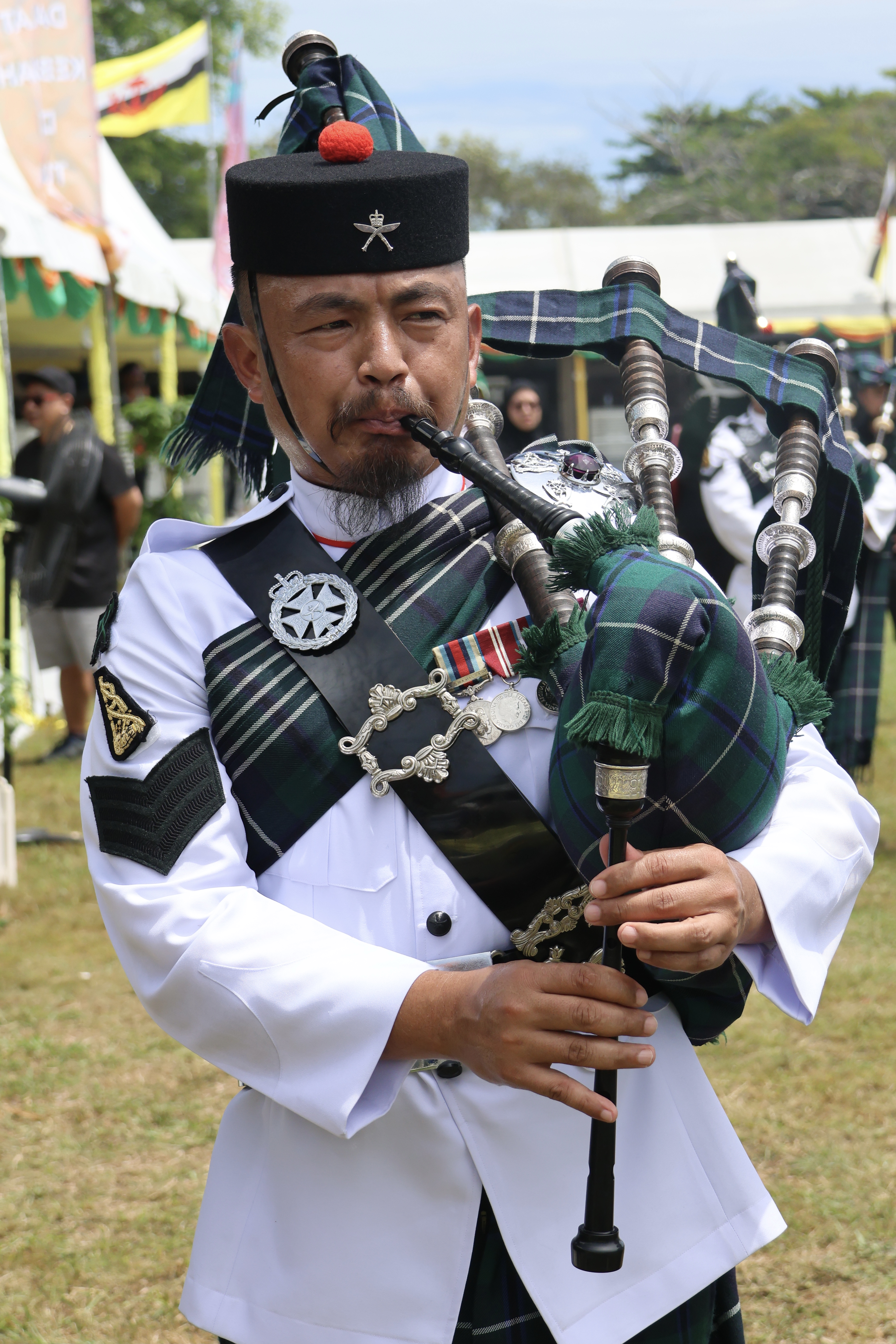
Medal seen on a soldier of the Royal Gurkha Rifles (RGR) in 2023.

The medal is silver and circular in shape and designed as follows:

- The obverse shows the crowned effigy of Elizabeth II with the inscription ELIZABETH II DEI GRATIA REGINA FID. DEF..
- The reverse bears the Union Flag, surrounded by the inscription FOR OPERATIONAL SERVICE and the four major points of the compass with, between the points, four Coronets: Royal (top left), Naval (Navy, top right), Mural (Army, bottom left), and Astral (Royal Air Force, bottom right).

=== Clasps ===
Clasps awarded with the medal are named either for geographical regions or for specific operations for which the medal is awarded. As of March 2026, two clasps have been authorised with the medal. The "Afghanistan" Clasp is awarded for service specifically in Afghanistan. The "Operation PITTING" Clasp is awarded for service in Afghanistan during Operation Pitting. A silver rosette on the ribbon denotes entitlement to each clasp when no medal is worn.

Afghanistan

There are four variants of the 'Afghanistan' clasps to date:

- The first issue from 2002–2004 – the clasp had a smooth background behind the inscription.
- From 2005 to date, from Operation Herrick onwards – the clasp has a 'dappled' effect behind the inscription, similar to the 'Northern Ireland' clasp on the General Service Medal 1962–2007.
- During 2009, 1,000 medals were awarded with a third type of background. These were manufactured by Gladman & Norman Ltd under a one-off contract in response to increased demand.
- From May 2018 a standard background was adopted by the MoD Medal Office, this background is used on all clasps produced since that date including Afghanistan.

The medal was also awarded to UK civilians who were employed on Ministry of Defence contracts in Afghanistan, in support of British Forces in Afghanistan. Qualifying criteria are the same as HM Forces. The recipient's name and title (Mr, Mrs etc.) are engraved on the edge of the medal, whereas military recipients have their rank, name and service number. British Government contractors who worked in Afghanistan but who are ineligible for the Operational Service Medal may be entitled to the Civilian Service Medal (Afghanistan).

Operation Pitting

On 19 January 2022, the Ministry of Defence announced that the members of the Armed Forces who were deployed to Afghanistan in late 2021 in support of Operation Pitting would receive the OSM with the "Operation Pitting" clasp. Personnel already holding the Afghanistan OSM would receive the clasp to add to their existing medals.

=== Ribbon ===
The ribbon consists of a broad central red stripe, flanked each side by a stripe of navy blue and one of light blue, to represent the three services, with an outer stripe of light brown, to represent the Afghan landscape.

== Qualifying criteria ==
The criteria for the award of the medal and the clasps are complex and depend on length and area of service:

- Qualification for the medal without the clasp depended on service of varying lengths on operations, for example on operations Landman, Oracle, Ramson and Damien. The medal without clasp can also be awarded for service outside Afghanistan that directly supports ongoing operations in Afghanistan including, at various times, service in Pakistan, Uzbekistan, Kenya, Diego Garcia, Saudi Arabia and the Gulf.
- To qualify for the Afghanistan clasp, personnel must have served continuously for either 5, 21, or 30 days, depending on the Operation participated in and the dates served. The principal operations were: Operation Veritas (11 September 2001 – 28 February 2002); Operation Herrick (1 March 2002 – 31 December 2014); Operation Fingal (1 December 2001 – 20 September 2004); Operation Landman (11 September 2001 – 1 June 2004) and Operation Toral (January 2015 to July 2021).
- The qualifying period for the awarding of the Operation Pitting clasp is 5 days service or 3 air sorties within Afghanistan from 14 August to 28 August 2021, in support of Operation Pitting.

There is no minimum qualifying period for those killed, wounded or disabled during operations, nor where a recipient has been decorated for operational service (including a mention in dispatches or a King’s Commendation).

Qualifying service for the Operational Service Medal counts towards the period required to receive the Accumulated Campaign Service Medal.

== See also ==
- Civilian Service Medal (Afghanistan)
- Operational Service Medal for the Democratic Republic of Congo
- Operational Service Medal for Sierra Leone
- Operational Service Medal Iraq and Syria
