= Surrey Police =

English territorial police force

Agency overview
- Formed: 1 January 1851; 175 years ago
- Annual budget: £261.7 million (2021/22)

Jurisdictional structure
- Operations jurisdiction: Surrey, United Kingdom
- Map of Surrey Police's jurisdiction
- Area: 642 square miles (1,660 km^{2})
- Population: 1.1 million

Operational structure
- Overseen by: His Majesty's Inspectorate of Constabulary and Fire & Rescue Services; Independent Office for Police Conduct
- Headquarters: Guildford
- Police officers: 2,134 (including 141 special constables) (September 2020)
- Police community support officers: 156 (September 2020)
- Police and crime commissioner responsible: Lisa Townsend
- Agency executive: Tim De Meyer, Chief constable
- Divisions: 3

Facilities
- Stations: 11

Website
- www.surrey.police.uk

Surrey Police, formerly known as Surrey Constabulary, is the territorial police force responsible for policing the county of Surrey in South East England. The force has its headquarters at Mount Browne, Guildford. The Chief Constable is Tim De Meyer.

== History ==
On 1 January 1851, the Surrey Constabulary began its policing of the county with a total of 70 officers, the youngest of whom was 14 years old. The first Chief Constable was Henry Cadogan Hastings, who served in this capacity for 48 years. Originally Guildford, Reigate and Godalming had separate borough police forces. The Reigate and Guildford forces were merged into Surrey's in 1943.

== Today ==
Part of the present force area was originally part of the Metropolitan Police District, and was only transferred to the control of Surrey Police from the Metropolitan Police in 2000. This includes the boroughs of Epsom and Ewell, Spelthorne and part of Reigate and Banstead and Elmbridge. Surrey Police was divided into three divisions but in 2010 became a single division, and in March 2014 was policed by 1,938 regular police officers, in addition to 182 Special Constables and 153 Police Community Support Officers. Surrey has one of the lowest crime rates in England and Wales. It now has two area divisions as of 2026.

For 2017/18, Surrey Police had a total expenditure of £224.1m, of which £183.2m went on employee costs, £27.3m on supplies and services, £8.8m on premises, and £4.8m on transport. It also had £11.1m of income, resulting in "gross expenditure" of £213m.

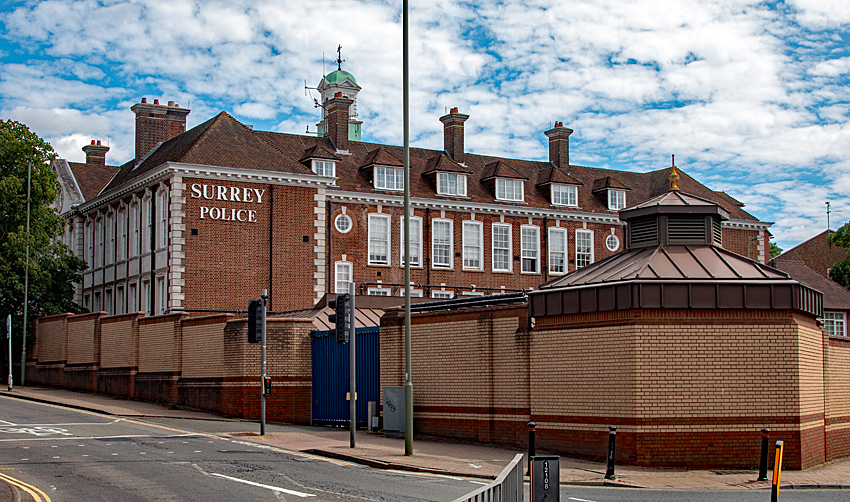
Woking police station

Surrey Police has three main divisions: two area divisions, Eastern, and Western; and a specialist crime/ops division. Within the two divisions are multiple borough teams. Typically each borough will have a Neighbourhood Specialist Team (formerly they Safer Neighbourhood Team) and a Neighbourhood Policing Team (Formerly the Area Patrol Team/Targeted Patrol Team/Response). These borough teams are supported by investigative teams which span the whole division, this being the Criminal Investigation Department (CID) and the Safeguarding Investigation Unit (SIU).

The specialist crime division is often referred to as OPS, and includes specialist units. This being the Roads Policing Unit (RPU), Tactical Firearms Unit (TFU), Specialist Dog Handlers, Crime Scene Investigation Officers (formerly SOCOs).

There are further force wide teams, some of which are now joint teams with Sussex Police, including the Paedophile and OnLine Investigation Team (POLIT), Major Crime Investigation Team (MCIT, Sussex/Surrey Joint team), Sexual Offences Investigation Team (SOIT) and then a range of support services typical of many forces.

In November 2023, Surrey Police announced it would have to move out of Reigate police station due to reinforced autoclaved aerated concrete (Raac) being discovered in the building. Repairs are expected to take up to two years to complete. The station moved to the former Surrey Fire and Rescue Service headquarters at Wray Park in the interim. In August 2026, the force announced that preparatory work on the new eastern headquarters at Cleeve Road in Leatherhead woud commence in September.

== Senior people ==
=== Police and crime commissioners ===
The first election for Surrey Police and Crime Commissioner took place on 15 November 2012. Kevin Hurley (independent, stood under the label "Zero Tolerance Policing ex Chief"), who was a retired Metropolitan Police borough commander, was elected. He defeated candidates from Labour, the Conservatives, the Liberal Democrats, UKIP, plus an independent.

The second election took place on 5 May 2016. The Conservative candidate, David Munro, was elected. He defeated Jamie Goldrick, independent; Kevin Hurley; Camille Juliff, independent; Howard Kaye, Labour; Paul Kennedy, Liberal Democrat; and Julia Searle, UKIP.

Lisa Townsend, Conservative, is the current PCC. She was first elected in 2021 and re elected in May 2024.

=== Chief constables ===
Chief constables have been:

- 1851–1899: Captain Henry Cadogan Hastings
- 1899–1930: Captain Mowbray Lees Sant
- 1930–1946: Major Geoffrey Nicholson
- 1946–1956: Joseph Simpson (later Sir Joseph Simpson)
- 1956–1968: Herman Rutherford
- 1968–1982: Sir Peter Matthews
- 1982–1991: Brian Hayes
- 1991–1997: David Williams
- 1998–2000: Ian Blair
- 2000–2004: Denis O'Connor
- 2004–2008: Robert Quick
- 2009–2011: Mark Rowley
- 2012–2015: Lynne Owens
- 2016–2019: Nick Ephgrave
- 2019–2023: Gavin Stephens
- 2023–present: Tim De Meyer

== Ranks ==
Surrey Police has the following ranks. Every rank from constable to chief superintendent has a detective equivalent. These confer no additional powers or authority from their uniform equivalents.

- Chief constable
- Deputy chief constable
- Assistant chief constable
- Chief superintendent
- Superintendent
- Chief inspector
- Inspector
- Sergeant
- Constable

== Air operations unit ==
Surrey has air operations covered by the National Police Air Service. The helicopter, call sign NPAS15, which predominately covers the Surrey Policing area is based at Redhill Aerodrome and also covers the Sussex, West Hampshire and Essex Area.

== Surrey Police Museum ==
To help celebrate its 150th anniversary, a museum portraying the history of the Force was opened at Mount Browne, the Surrey Police's headquarters in Guildford. Surrey resident Sir Michael Caine, CBE, opened the museum on 22 October 2001. Displays included artefacts and touch-screen technology, tracing the history of the Force up to the present day.

== Training of new recruits ==
Surrey Police now operates the PLC (police, law & community) course method of training and recruitment. This course ensures that potential recruits already possess knowledge of police law before applying to join Surrey Police. The course is run by several colleges in Surrey, as well as the University of Portsmouth. Although the PLC certificate can be obtained with a pass mark of 40% in the final examination, Surrey Police require a pass mark of 60% to become eligible to reach the application stage of the recruitment process.

The course allows the training phase of a police officer to be reduced by 15 weeks.

== Complaints ==
There were 710 complaint cases for Surrey Police in 2009/10. This is a 206% change on the 2003/04 figure. This is the second highest increase (after Northamptonshire) of all 43 forces in England and Wales. For comparison, the average change across forces in England and Wales over the same period was 113%. Surrey Police have been condemned by a coroner's jury over the death of Terry Smith who was restrained and put in a spit hood and kept in restraints for over two hours despite saying repeatedly that he could not breathe. In June 2024 the force referred itself to the police complaints watchdog following an incident in which a police vehicle was used to ram a calf that was loose in the streets of Staines. Home Secretary James Cleverly said he would be asking for an urgent explanation, describing the actions as "heavy handed".The RSPCA said the police response, which saw the animal hit twice by a marked vehicle in Staines-on-Thames, "appears disproportionate".

== Proposed force mergers ==
Under merger plans announced by then Home Secretary, Charles Clarke, in 2006, the number of police forces in England and Wales would have been cut from 43 to 24. Proposals put forward on 20 March 2006 would have seen the Surrey force merged with Sussex Police to form a single strategic police force for the area. The two organisations do have certain specialist departments which are shared across both force areas such as the firearms & roads policing units and alongside major investigations.

Police authorities had until 7 April 2006 to respond to the plans; the Home Secretary then announced on 11 April 2006 that Surrey Police and Sussex Police would merge by 2008. However, on 12 July 2006, a Government minister announced that all proposed police merger plans in England and Wales were on hold.

In January 2026, the Home Secretary, Shabana Mahmood, proposed to significantly reduce the number of police forces by the end of the next parliament. In response, Police and Crime Commissioner, Lisa Townsend, set up a public consultation on merging Surrey Police with neighbouring police forces.

== Crime and detection rates ==
Surrey has the joint seventh lowest crime rate (with one other force) of the 43 force areas in England and Wales, with 55 crimes per 1,000 population. In the year to the end of March 2012 there were 61,757 crimes recorded in Surrey, according to Office for National Statistics figures published in July 2012. This is a 5.2% drop on 2010/11 when there were 65,125 crimes recorded in Surrey.

Despite having the joint seventh lowest crime rate, the detection rate for offences was the joint second lowest (with one other force) of the 43 forces in England and Wales, with a rate of 20 percent. The average for England and Wales was 27 percent.

Detection rates by offence group, percentages
	Total	Violence against the person	Sexual offences	Robbery	Burglary	Offences against vehicles	Other theft offences	Fraud and forgery	Criminal damage	Drug offences	Other offences
Surrey (2011/12)	20	27	27	21	10	6	17	15	8	92	54
Surrey (2010/11)	20	28	26	25	10	6	17	22	9	91	48
England and Wales (2011/12)	27	44	30	21	13	11	21	22	13	92	68
England and Wales (2010/11)	28	44	30	21	13	11	22	24	14	94	69

== Notable cases ==
- Guildford Four and Maguire Seven
- Deaths at Deepcut army barracks
- Murder of Milly Dowler
- Operation Arundel and Operation Ravine

== Breakdown of officer numbers ==
Surrey Police officer numbers by rank and division as at 31 December 2015:
Division	Police Constables	Det Constables	Sergeants	Inspectors	Ch Inspectors	Supt	Ch Supt	ACPO	Total
Western	319	40	60	14	3	2	1	0	439
Eastern	280	40	57	14	3	2	1	0	397
Northern	244	37	55	12	3	2	0	0	353
Specialist Crime	78	74	41	14	5	5	1	0	218
Operations	158	1	26	3	1	2	0	0	191
Support Services	162	2	10	1	0	1	0	0	176
CJ & Custody	7	0	52	5	1	1	0	0	66
DCC Portfolio	5	2	8	5	2	1	1	0	24
Contact	0	0	4	11	2	1	0	0	18
Support Units	1	2	4	3	0	0	0	4	14
Total	1,254	198	317	82	20	17	4	4	1,896

== Road casualties in Surrey ==
Mercedes-Benz C-Class used by Surrey Police in 2023, alongside road safety equipment carried in the vehicle

As well as preventing and detecting crime, Surrey Police say that "dealing with road accidents forms a large part of our job, or at least taking measures to try and prevent them". The following table shows the number of casualties, grouped by severity, on Surrey's roads over recent years.

	2008	2009	2010	2011	2012	2013	2014
Fatal	45	41	32	28	18	18	38
Serious	483	530	488	554	556	581	697
Total	528	571	520	582	574	599	735
Slight	5,411	5,184	4,811	5,173	4,991	4,624	4,673
Grand total	5,939	5,755	5,331	5,755	5,565	5,223	5,408

== Criticism by the IPCC ==
=== Lack of investigation of phone hacking ===
In criticism widely reported in the media, Deborah Glass, Deputy Chair of the IPCC, said in a six-page report regarding the hacking in 2002 of the phone of the murdered Milly Dowler:

"It is apparent from the evidence that there was knowledge of this at all levels within the investigation team.

"There is equally no doubt that Surrey Police did nothing to investigate it; nobody was arrested or charged in relation to the alleged interception of those messages either in 2002 or subsequently, until the Operation Weeting arrests in 2011.

"Phone hacking was a crime in 2002 and it should have been investigated. [...] We have not been able to uncover any evidence, in documentation or witness statements, of why and by whom that decision [not to investigate] was made: former senior officers in particular appear to have been afflicted by a form of collective amnesia about this." She also said: "In view of the widespread knowledge uncovered in this investigation, we consider that it is scarcely credible that no one connected to the Milly Dowler investigation recognised the relevance and importance of the knowledge that Surrey Police had in 2002, before this information was disclosed by Operation Weeting."

=== Return of firearms used in double murder ===
In Farnham in February 2014, John Lowe murdered Christine and Lucy Lee, using one of his firearms that had been returned to him by Surrey Police. In October 2014, Lowe was convicted of their murders and received a life sentence with a minimum term of 25 years.

Two independent reports by Hampshire Constabulary and North Yorkshire Police criticised the decision to return his firearms, which prompted the IPCC to launch an independent investigation. This investigation concluded in February 2016 and it published its findings in a 73-page report in April 2017. IPCC associate commissioner Tom Milsom said: "Our investigation paints a deeply concerning portrait of how Surrey Police's firearms licensing team operated at that time. We found a unit which lacked the necessary training and processes to manage such a serious responsibility, staffed by individuals who were failing to undertake their duties with rigour and due consideration."

Two staff members left Surrey Police as a result of this investigation, one being dismissed for gross misconduct and the other retiring before a hearing for gross misconduct could take place.

The IPCC also conducted a separate independent investigation into complaints made by Stacey Banner, the daughter of Christine Lee and sister of Lucy Lee, who was arrested in a separate incident weeks after the murders. The IPCC found that a detective constable and a detective sergeant had cases to answer for misconduct and a detective inspector for gross misconduct.

== See also ==
- List of law enforcement agencies in the United Kingdom, Crown Dependencies and British Overseas Territories
- Law enforcement in the United Kingdom

=== Other Surrey emergency services ===
- Surrey Fire & Rescue Service
- South East Coast Ambulance Service
- SURSAR
