= Operational Service Medal Iraq and Syria =

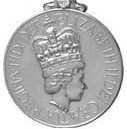
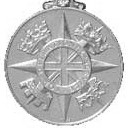
- Operational Service Medal, obverse and reverse
- Type: Military Campaign Medal
- Awarded for: Campaign service
- Description: Silver disk, 36 mm diameter.
- Presented by: United Kingdom
- Eligibility: Members of the United Kingdom armed forces and civilians
- Campaign: Operation Shader
- Clasps: Iraq & Syria
- First award: 2018
- Service ribbon of the medal

The Operational Service Medal Iraq and Syria or Operation Shader Medal is a British armed forces campaign medal, awarded mostly to military personnel who served in the operational area of, or in support of Operation Shader. The medal was first announced by then Defence Secretary, Sir Michael Fallon on 19 September 2017. It was first awarded, to service personnel, on 18 July 2018 in London by Defence Secretary Gavin Williamson. This Operational Service Medal is the first medal of the contemporary era to be awarded to individuals who served outside of the operational area, reflecting the changing nature of warfare.

== Operational Service Medal ==
The Operational Service Medal (OSM) was established in 1999 to replace the General Service Medal (1962) for all new operations. A separate medal of the same design is awarded for each campaign, differentiated by a distinct ribbon. Prior to its most recent version, the medal has been awarded for three separate campaigns:

- Afghanistan (from 11 September 2001)
- Sierra Leone (May 2000 – July 2002)
- Democratic Republic of Congo (June – September 2003)

== Medal ==
The Operational Service Medal for Iraq and Syria is silver and circular in shape.

- Obverse: the crowned effigy of Queen Elizabeth II with the inscription ELIZABETH II DEI GRATIA REGINA FID. DEF.
- Reverse: the Union Flag, surrounded by the inscription FOR OPERATIONAL SERVICE and the four major points of the compass with, between the points, four Coronets: Royal (top left), Naval (top right), Mural-Army (bottom left), and Astral-Royal Air Force (bottom right).
- Ribbon: a broad central red stripe, flanked each side by a stripe of navy blue and one of light blue, to represent the three services, with an outer stripe of grey.
- Clasp: Iraq & Syria clasp awarded to those recipients who served in the operational area. A silver rosette denotes the clasp when worn on the ribbon bar.

== Criteria ==
The Queen approved eligibility criteria for the medal to include those personnel who have made a significant contribution to efforts in Iraq and Syria, including civilians, even if those efforts were outside the operational area. Those personnel awarded the medal who served outside the operational area will receive the medal without the clasp.

With a clasp

The medal is awarded with the clasp ‘Iraq and Syria’ to British service and attached personnel who:

- 30 days continuous or 45 days cumulative operational service in the international boundaries of Iraq and Syria
- 10 operational sorties over Iraq and/or 6 operational sorties over Syria with the RAF

Without a clasp

The criteria for the award of the medal without clasp is:

- 50 hours on Operation SHADER missions as an RPAS pilot, sensor operator or mission intelligence coordinator;
- 45 days continuous or 60 days cumulative service with significant support or direct contribution to Op SHADER with specific units and specified locations, which include Al Udeid, Crete, Cyprus, Jordan, Kuwait and Turkey.
