= Superior Civilian Service Award =

Superior Civilian Service Award or Superior Civilian Service Medal may refer to the following U.S. awards:

- Department of the Army Superior Civilian Service Award
- Navy Superior Civilian Service Award
- NIMA Superior Civilian Service Award issued by the National Imagery and Mapping Agency
- DeCA Superior Civilian Service Award issued by the Defense Commissary Agency
- DOD Inspector General Superior Civilian Service Award issued by the US Department of Defense Inspector General

== See also ==
- Civilian Service Medal
