= Surrey Search and Rescue =

Surrey Search and Rescue (SurSAR)
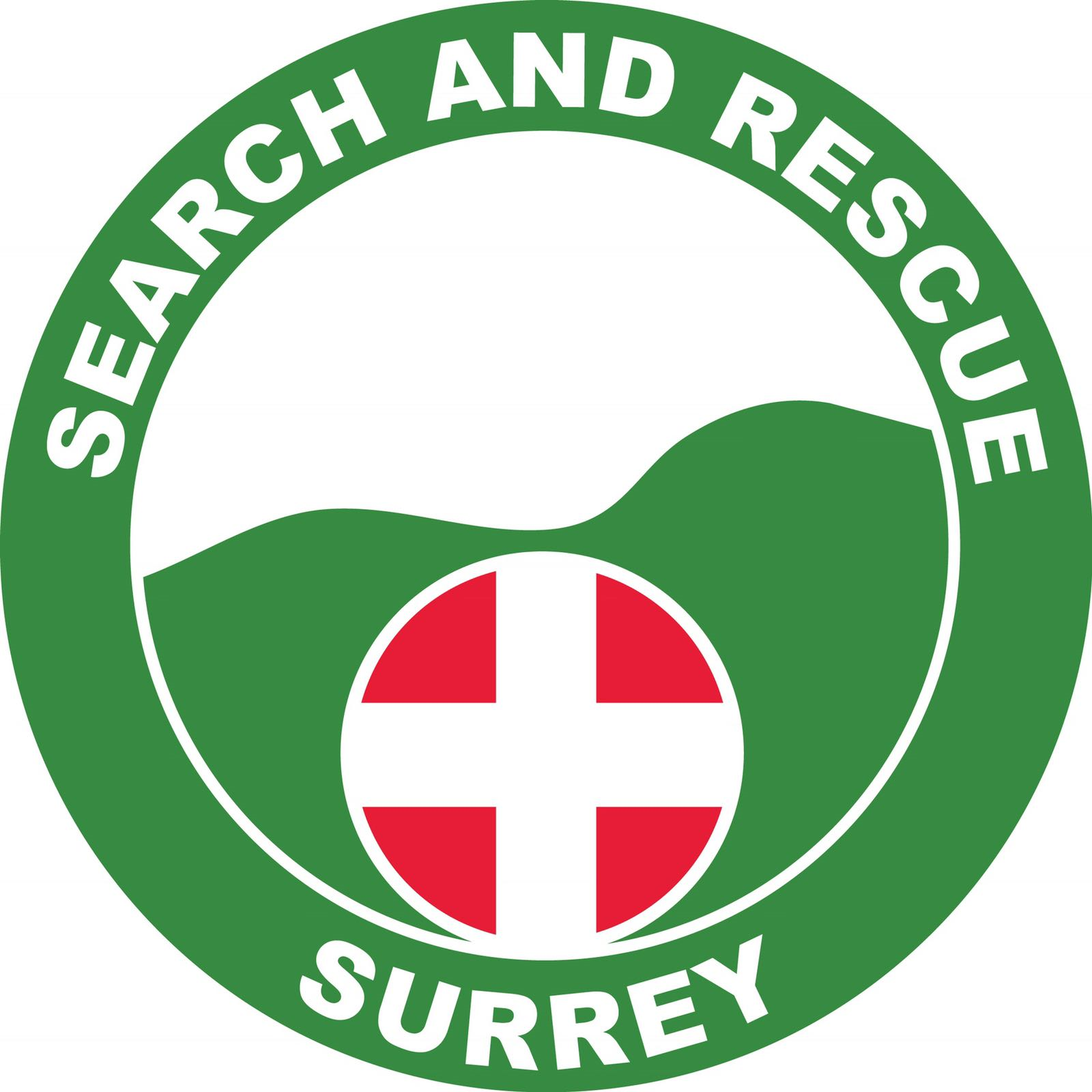
- Founded: 2010
- Type: Registered charity
- Registration no.: 1194397
- Headquarters: Woking
- Region served: Surrey, England
- Services: Search and Rescue, Civil Contingencies
- Volunteers: 82
- Website: surreysar.org.uk

Surrey Search and Rescue (SurSAR) is a lowland search and rescue team based in Surrey, United Kingdom, who respond for missing person search, water rescue, drone imaging and other taskings at the request of Surrey Police and Surrey Fire and Rescue Service, as well as other statutory and government agencies. In common with most UKSAR teams, SurSAR's members are volunteers. The team has been a registered charity in England and Wales since October 2011.

== History ==
The organisation was founded in 2010 by Tim Rowsell. During the first six months of 2011, the unit started to take shape and quickly acquired provisional status to join the Association of Lowland Search And Rescue (ALSAR). During this time the unit was involved in eight searches including the search for missing Sian O'Callaghan from Swindon.

In September 2011, a further search dog qualified at the National Assessments, and the unit had now assisted in over 50 searches across the country. Later that year, the unit acquired another 12 search technicians and a dog to bring the unit up to 38 volunteers. By the end of 2011 the unit had responded to 69 callouts. On Sunday 8 January 2012, SurSAR were granted full membership of Lowland Rescue.

In 2014 the team provided support to Op FRANKLIN, the response to flooding in Surrey and surrounding areas, and were subsequently invited to 10 Downing Street in recognition of the work undertaken in support of the local community.

SurSAR have added further capabilities, including Swift Water Rescue Technicians (SRT's), Remotely Piloted Air Systems (drone pilots) and Lowland Rescue First Responders (medics), all trained to national and accredited standards. In October 2016, the team was awarded the Queen's Award for Voluntary Service. In 2017, SurSAR responded to 98 callouts, an increase of 29 from 2011. In 2018, SurSAR was the busiest Lowland Rescue team in Great Britain.

In 2019, the partnership between SurSAR and Surrey Fire and Rescue Service was bolstered when selected team members were trained in response driving and were subsequently able to respond to emergencies tasked by the Joint Emergency Communications Centre (JECC) under Fire Service exemptions, enabling safe and rapid response to life-threatening incidents.

== Fundraising ==
Due to the unit's voluntary status, the unit relies entirely on donations from the public and local businesses. In its first year, SurSAR also received £8,657 from the National Lottery Community Fund. SurSAR became a registered charity on 19 October 2011.

== Callouts ==
Surrey Search and Rescue can be called out by Surrey Police, the Metropolitan Police Service, Surrey Fire and Rescue Service, Local Resilience Forum partners or by other SAR units.

The table below shows the callouts (and standbys) that the unit have answered each year (current year to date (correct at updating)).

Year	Callouts	Notes
2011	69	Mar – Dec only
2012	77	
2013	68	
2014	77	
2015	81	
2016	67	
2017	98	
