= Surrey Police and Crime Commissioner =

- Incumbent; Lisa Townsend since 13 May 2021
- Police and crime commissioner of Surrey Police
- Reports to: Surrey Police and Crime Panel
- Appointer: Electorate of Surrey
- Term length: Four years
- Constituting instrument: Police Reform and Social Responsibility Act 2011
- Precursor: Surrey Police Authority
- Inaugural holder: Kevin Hurley
- Formation: 22 November 2012
- Deputy: Deputy Police and Crime Commissioner
- Salary: £73,300
- Website: www.surrey-pcc.gov.uk

The Surrey Police and Crime Commissioner is the police and crime commissioner, an elected official tasked with setting out the way crime is tackled by Surrey Police in the English County of Surrey. The post was created in November 2012, following an election held on 15 November 2012, and replaced the Surrey Police Authority. The Previous incumbent was David Munro, who represented the Conservative Party. As of 2021, Lisa Townsend is the new Police and Crime Commissioner for Surrey.

== List of Surrey Police and Crime Commissioners ==
Name	Political party	From	To
Kevin Hurley	Zero Tolerance Policing ex Chief	22 November 2012	11 May 2016
David Munro	Conservative	12 May 2016	12 May 2021
Lisa Townsend	Conservative	13 May 2021	Incumbent

== 2024 election ==
In the 2024 election, the voting system was changed to first past the post. (FPTP)

2024 Surrey police and crime commissioner election
Party	Candidate	Votes	%	±%
Conservative	Lisa Townsend	95,538	36.4	+3.7
Liberal Democrats	Paul Kennedy	82,213	31.3	+11.1
Labour	Kate Chinn	42,813	16.3	+4.5
Independent	Alex Coley	42,052	16.0	New
Turnout		265,682	29.9	
Rejected ballots		3,066		
Total votes		262,616		
Registered electors				
Conservative hold		Swing		

== 2021 election ==
Surrey Police and Crime Commissioner election, 2021
Party	Candidate	1st round		2nd round			1st round votesTransfer votes, 2nd round
Party	Candidate	Total	Of round	Transfers	Total	Of round	1st round votesTransfer votes, 2nd round
Conservative	Lisa Townsend	112,260	32.69%	42,856	155,116		
Liberal Democrats	Paul Kennedy	69,412	20.21%	42,803	112,215		
Zero Tolerance Policing ex Chief	Kevin Hurley	59,554	17.34%				
Independent	David Munro	53,103	15.46%				
Labour	Howard Kaye	40,597	11.82%				
Turnout		343,375					
Rejected ballots		8,449	2.46				
Total votes		334,926					
Registered electors							
Conservative win							

== 2016 election ==
Surrey Police and Crime Commissioner election, 2016
Party	Candidate	1st round		2nd round			1st round votesTransfer votes, 2nd round
Party	Candidate	Total	Of round	Transfers	Total	Of round	1st round votesTransfer votes, 2nd round
Conservative	David Munro	82,125	35.33%	17,997	100,122		
Zero Tolerance Policing ex Chief	Kevin Hurley	41,603	17.90%	16,078	57,681		
Liberal Democrats	Paul Kennedy	29,933	12.88%				
Labour	Howard Kaye	28,005	12.05%				
UKIP	Julia Searle	24,055	10.35%				
Independent	Jamie Goldrick	14,007	6.03%				
Independent	Camille Juliff	12,746	5.48%				
Turnout		232,474	28.07%				
Rejected ballots		7,461	3.11%				
Total votes		239,935					
Registered electors		854,648					
Conservative gain from Zero Tolerance Policing ex Chief							

== 2012 election ==
Surrey Police and Crime Commissioner election, 2012
Party	Candidate	1st round		2nd round			1st round votesTransfer votes, 2nd round
Party	Candidate	Total	Of round	Transfers	Total	Of round	1st round votesTransfer votes, 2nd round
Zero Tolerance Policing ex Chief	Kevin Hurley	34,378	26.12%	18,415	52,793		
Conservative	Julie Iles	34,391	26.13%	10,677	45,068		
Independent	Peter Williams	26,292	19.97%				
Labour	Robert Evans	17,384	13.21%				
UKIP	Robert Shatwell	10,684	8.12%				
Liberal Democrats	Nick O'Shea	8,503	6.46%				
Turnout		131,632	15.36%				
Rejected ballots							
Total votes							
Registered electors		856,968					
Zero Tolerance Policing ex Chief win							
