= General Service Medal (Canada) =

- Type: Service medal
- Awarded for: Deployment outside of Canada with Canadian Forces, though not necessarily in a theater of operations, to provide direct support, on a full-time basis, to operations in the presence of an armed enemy.
- Presented by: The monarch of Canada
- Eligibility: Members of the Canadian Forces or allied forces
- Status: Currently awarded
- Established: March 2004
- First award: 29 November 2004

Precedence
- Next (higher): General Campaign Star
- Next (lower): Operational Service Medal

The General Service Medal (GSM; French: Médaille du service général) is a service medal of Canada established by Queen Elizabeth II in March 2004 and presented for the first time on 29 November 2004. It is awarded to members of the Canadian Forces, or members of allied forces, for deployment outside of Canada with Canadian Forces, though not necessarily in a theater of operations, to provide direct support, on a full-time basis, to operations in the presence of an armed enemy.

== History ==
The medal was initially only awarded with one ribbon. Bars were to be attached to denote the area or mission which qualified for recognition. These two bars were titled "Allied Force" and "ISAF+FIAS". In 2009, the GSM was modified to abolish the existing system of bars. These bars were replaced with ribbons denoting specific a theater or service. This allows the use of bars to recognize multiple rotations when appropriate. As a result, recipients of the original GSM with the Allied Force bar remounted their medal without the bar and using the new Allied Force ribbon. Recipients of the medal with the ISAF+FIAS bar needed only to have the medal remounted without the bar on the same ribbon.

== Criteria ==
The General Service Medal is awarded to members of the Canadian Armed Forces as well as members of allied forces who serve with the Canadian Armed Forces on deployments outside of Canada. These deployments need not necessarily be into a theatre of operations, but must provide full-time direct support to operations in the presence of an armed enemy. Canadian citizens who are not members of the armed forces may also be awarded the medal. Civilians must have deployed outside of Canada and worked with the CF to provide full-time direct support to operations in the presence of an armed enemy. The GSM is always awarded with a ribbon specific to the theatre or type of service being recognized. Each ribbon has its own criteria.

=== Allied Force ===
Ribbon bar for Allied Force GSM.

The General Service Medal with Allied Force ribbon is awarded to personnel who served at least 30 days' cumulative service in direct support of Operation Allied Force in Aviano or Vicenza, Italy, or in Skopje, Former Yugoslav Republic of Macedonia, from 24 March to 10 June 1999. Some recipients may have to exchange their previously awarded NATO Medal for the GSM-Allied Force.

=== South-West Asia ===
Ribbon bar for South-West Asia GSM.

The General Service Medal with South-West Asia ribbon is awarded to Canadian Armed Forces personnel who provided 30 cumulative days of direct support outside the theatre for operations within South-West Asia. The first eligible period of service was from 24 April 2003 to 31 July 2009 for direct support of Canadian participation in the International Security Assistance Force (ISAF) in Afghanistan. The next period of service from 1 August 2009 to a date yet to be determined for 30 cumulative days of direct support, provided outside the theatre of operations. The theatre is defined as the political boundaries of Afghanistan, the Persian Gulf, the Gulf of Oman, the Gulf of Aden, the Red Sea, the Suez Canal, and those parts of the Indian Ocean and the Arabian Sea that are west of sixty-eight degrees East longitude and north of five degrees South latitude.

Canadian citizens who are not members of the military are eligible for the GSM South-West Asia for completing the same amount of service, during the same time frames, and in the same areas, but must have been deployed inside the theatre of operations. The only civilians eligible for this medal are members of the Public Service of Canada working for the Canadian Armed Forces, Canadian civilians under contract with the Canadian Armed Forces, and Canadian police officers serving under the authority of the Canadian Armed Forces.

=== Expedition ===
Ribbon bar for Expedition GSM.

The General Service Medal with Expedition ribbon has been approved only for the following qualifying periods of service:

This medal is awarded to Canadian personnel in support of Operation Iraqi Freedom, specifically the Canadian Detachment AWACS, USAF Air Expeditionary Wing, Prince Sultan Air Base, Riyadh, Saudi Arabia, since 27 February 2003, so long as the service has not been recognized by the award of any other service medal. Canadian Armed Forces exchange personnel with the US military in Iraq would be eligible because the United States does not award its service medals to foreign personnel.

For service in Kuwait in support of Operation Impact against Islamic State in Iraq and Syria from 5 October 2015.

== Appearance ==
210 days service

390 days service

570 days service

750 days service

930 days service

1100 days service

The General Service Medal is a 36-millimetre-wide (1.4 in) circular silver-coloured medal. The obverse of the medal bears the crowned effigy of the Queen of Canada with the inscription "Elizabeth II Dei gratia Regina" (Note: By the grace of God Queen) above and "Canada" below. The inscription is separated by small crosses pattée. The reverse bears a depiction of two crossed swords, an anchor, and an eagle in flight superimposed over each other, the whole surmounted by the royal crown and surrounded by a wreath of maple leaves.

The ribbons of the General Service Medals are 32 millimetres (1.3 in) wide and the colors vary, depending on the mission. All of the ribbons have an 18-millimetre (0.71 in) central stripe of red with 2-millimetre (0.079 in) edges of white, the 5-millimetre (0.20 in) edges of the ribbon are the stripes that vary. The Allied Force ribbon has light blue edges, the South-West Asia ribbon has green edges, and the Expeditionary ribbon has light grey edges.

There are no bars authorized for the GSM Allied Force, but rotation bars are authorized for the GSM South-West Asia and Expedition. The rotation bars are silver with an oak leaf in the centre. A bar with five silver maple leaves is worn in lieu of a fifth bar. Each bar indicates a further 180 days of qualifying service.

When the undress ribbon is worn, a maple leaf is attached to indicate the award of a rotation bar. A silver maple leaf indicates one rotation bar, a gold maple leaf indicates two rotation bars, and a red maple leaf indicates three rotation bars. In the case of more than three bars, the maple leaves are worn in a combination indicating the total number of rotation bars awarded.
