= Civilian Service Medal =

Civilian Service Medal may refer to:

- Civilian Service Medal 1939–1945, awarded to civilians in Australia during World War II.
- Civilian Service Medal (Afghanistan), awarded by the British government to recognise service since 19 November 2001 in the transition to democracy in Afghanistan.
