= Surrey Fire and Rescue Service =

UK fire service

Operational area
- Country: England
- County: Surrey

Agency overview
- Chief Fire Officer: Dan Quin

Facilities and equipment
- Stations: 25
- Engines: 31
- Trucks: 1
- Platforms: 1
- HAZMAT: 2
- USAR: 4
- Wildland: 25
- Rescue boats: 3

Website
- www.surreycc.gov.uk/community/fire-and-rescue

The Surrey Fire and Rescue Service is the statutory fire and rescue service for the County of Surrey, England, with 25 fire stations. It comes under the administrative and legislative control of Surrey County Council, acting as the fire authority who fund the service by collecting a precept via council tax, and from central government funds, known as a grant settlement, and provide the political leadership for the service.

Surrey Fire and Rescue Service delivers prevention and protection to citizens against fires and many other life-threatening incidents as well as responding to all types of emergencies. It was established under the Fire and Rescue act, the Fire Safety Order and the Civil Contingencies act. It is part of Surrey County Council's Community Protection Group which includes other citizen focused services including trading standards, coronary service, emergency planning, military partnership, community resilience and corporate health and safety. The chief fire officer heads up the services that make up the Surrey Community Protection Group and is also the chairman of Surrey Local Resilience Forum.

== Organisation ==
Surrey Fire and Rescue Service employs approximately 800 staff and looks after a population of over 1 million people spread across an area of 1,663 km^{2} (642 square miles). The region features several large urban areas such as Guildford, Redhill and Woking; 64 miles (103 km) of motorway, and is near the two largest airports in the United Kingdom: London Heathrow and London Gatwick.

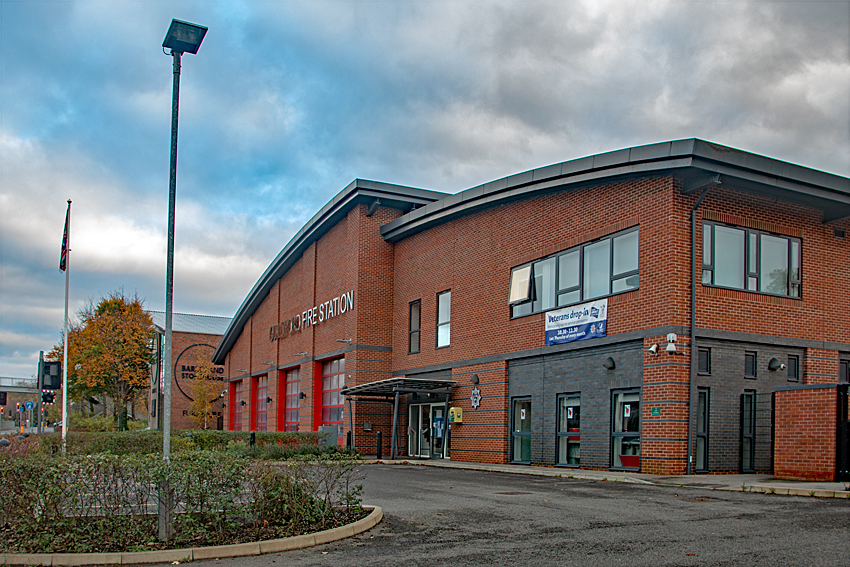
Guildford fire station on Ladymead

A total of 25 fire stations are strategically located throughout the county. Twelve of which are crewed on a fully whole-time basis, with fire engine crews on duty at the fire station 24 hours a day; one fire station is crewed by whole-time and retained firefighters, and two fire stations operate on a day-crewed/retained basis - during the day fire appliances are crewed by whole-time firefighters operating from the station with retained on-call backup as and when required, whereas during the evening and at night the fire station operates on an entirely on-call retained basis with firefighters responding from home. Three stations are crewed solely on a day crewing basis from 7:00-19:00, however neighbouring stations cover the area at night. Seven fire stations are crewed solely on a retained on-call basis. All retained on-call firefighters must live within a five-minute drive of the fire station.

Historically, fire cover was set to national standards that were defined back in the 1930s but today are based on local risk.

== Performance ==
Every fire and rescue service in England and Wales is periodically subjected to a statutory inspection by His Majesty's Inspectorate of Constabulary and Fire & Rescue Services (HMICFRS). The inspections investigate how well the service performs in each of three areas. On a scale of outstanding, good, requires improvement and inadequate, Surrey Fire and Rescue Service was rated as follows:

HMICFRS Inspection Surrey
Area	Rating 2018/19	Rating 2021/22	Description
Effectiveness	Requires improvement	Requires improvement	How effective is the fire and rescue service at keeping people safe and secure from fire and other risks?
Efficiency	Inadequate	Requires improvement	How efficient is the fire and rescue service at keeping people safe and secure from fire and other risks?
People	Requires improvement	Requires improvement	How well does the fire and rescue service look after its people?

== Gallery ==
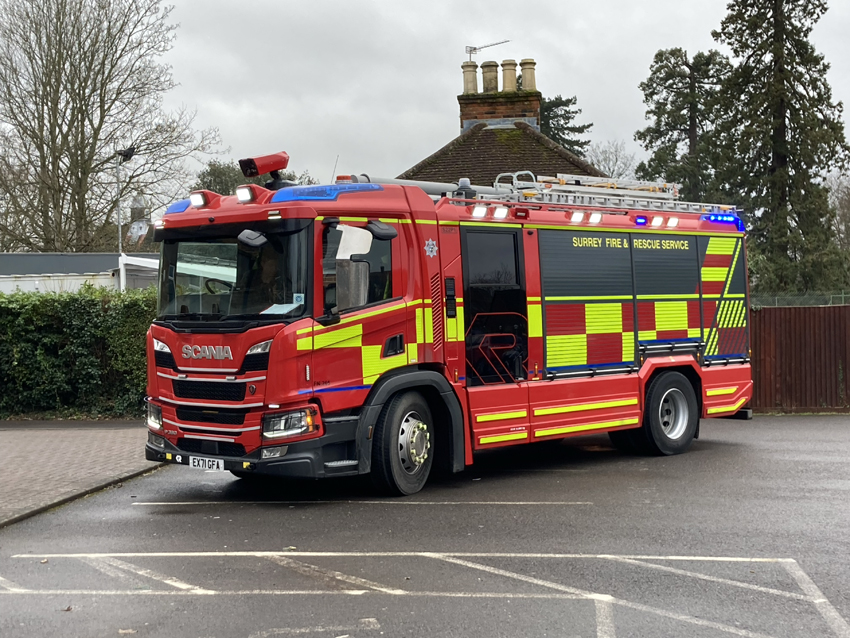
Scania P360 fire tender

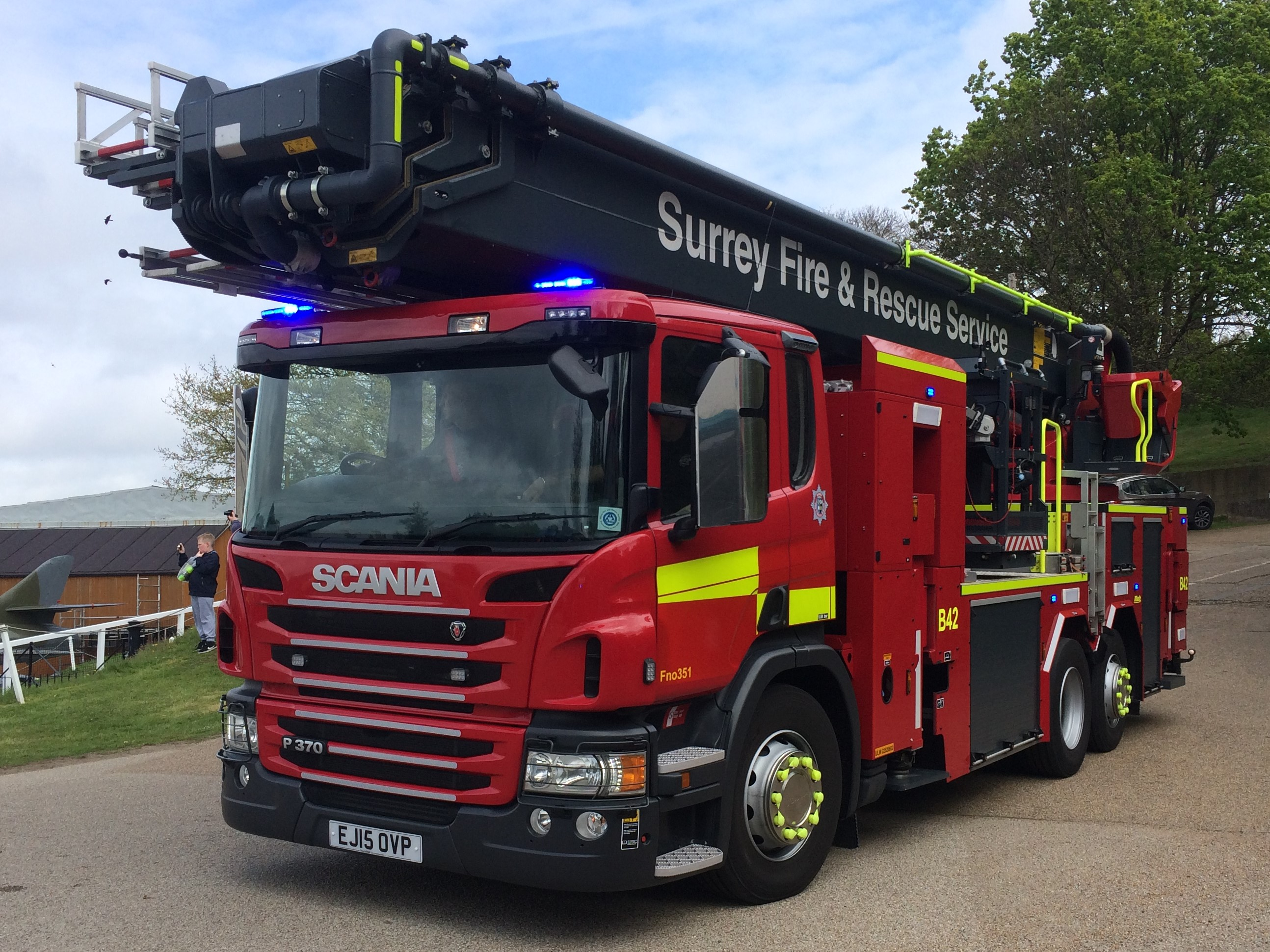
Surrey's 2015 registered aerial ladder platform

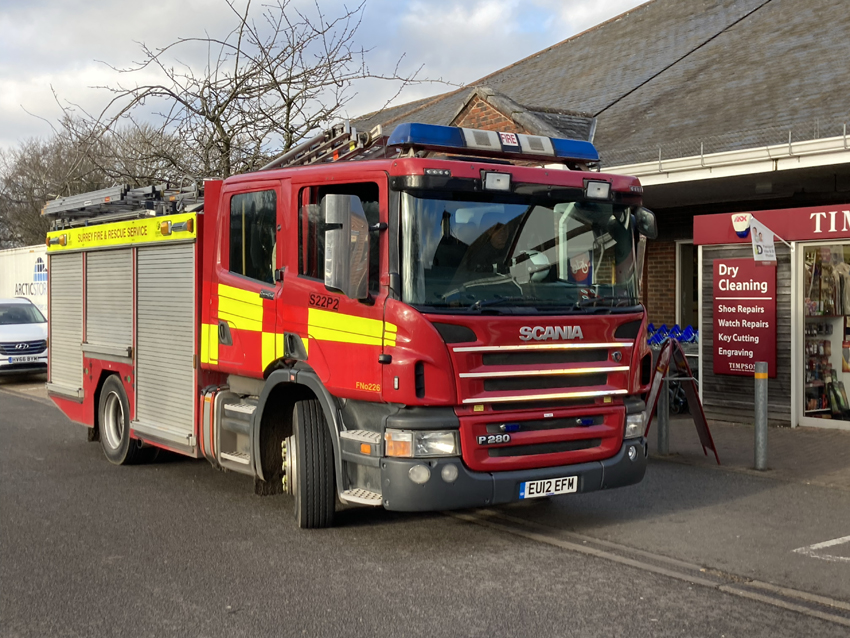
Scania P280 pump

== See also ==
- Fire services in the United Kingdom
- List of British firefighters killed in the line of duty
- Surrey Police
- South East Coast Ambulance Service
- SURSAR
