= Operational Service Medal (Canada) =

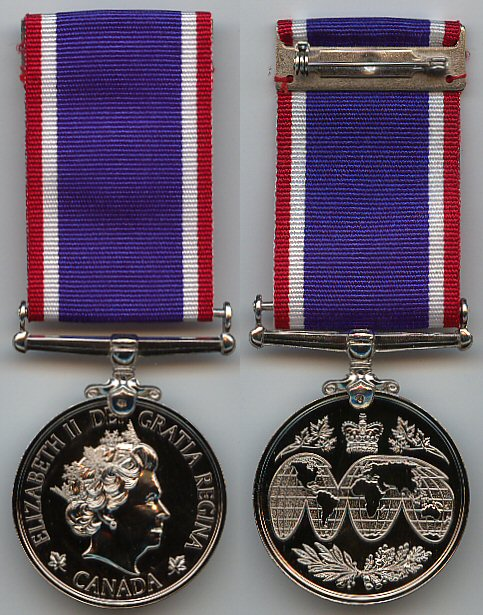
- Obverse and reverse of the medal (awarded for service in Haiti)
- Type: Campaign medal
- Awarded for: Members of the Canadian Forces, an allied force, or Canadian police officers who have taken part in important missions overseas.
- Presented by: The monarch of Canada
- Status: Currently awarded
- Established: 5 July 2010
- First award: 6 December 2010

Precedence
- Next (higher): General Service Medal
- Next (lower): Special Service Medal

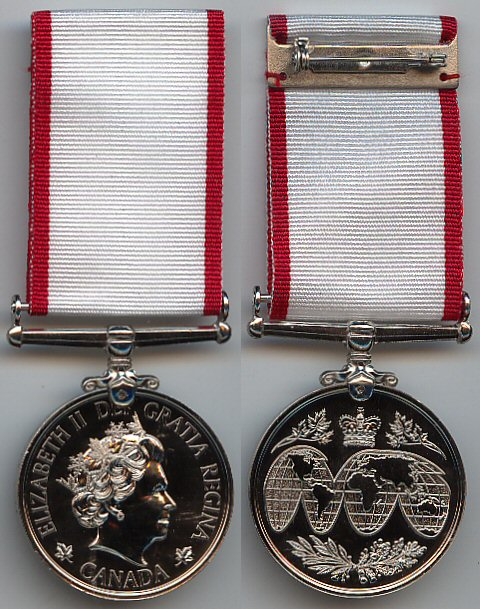
Operational Service Medal for service in humanitarian missions

The Operational Service Medal (French: Médaille du service opérationnel) is a campaign medal created in 2010 by the Canadian monarch-in-Council to recognize members of the Canadian Forces, allied forces, Canadian police officers, or Canadian civilians working for the Canadian Forces who had directly participated in any military campaign under Canadian or allied command. It is, within the Canadian system of honours, the lowest of the war and operational service medals.

== Design ==
The Operational Service Medal is in the form of a 36 millimetres (1.4 in) diameter cupro-nickel disc with, on the obverse, the words ELIZABETH II DEI GRATIA REGINA (Latin abbreviation for: Elizabeth II, by the Grace of God, Queen) and CANADA separated by small maple leaves and surrounding an effigy of Queen Elizabeth II wearing a Canadian diadem of maple leaves and snowflakes, symbolizing her roles as both fount of honour and Commander-in-Chief of the Canadian Forces. On the reverse is a representation of the globe resting above two crossed branches of laurel and oak leaves and surmounted by a St. Edward's Crown that is flanked on both sides by three maple leaves on a single stem.

This medallion is worn at the left chest, suspended on a 31.8mm wide ribbon with thin, vertical stripes in Canada's official colours of red and white flanking a central band; the colour of the middle band reflects the specific theatre or task for which the medal is being awarded: sand for South-West Asia, light green for Sierra Leone, royal blue for Haiti, dark green for Sudan, white for Humanitas and light grey for Expedition.

== Eligibility and presentation ==
On 5 July 2010, Queen Elizabeth II, on the advice of her Cabinet under Prime Minister Stephen Harper, created the Operational Service Medal to recognize members of the Canadian Forces, allied foreign forces, Canadian police officers, or Canadian civilians working for the Canadian Forces who had served full-time in the theatre of war or peacekeeping, or participated in the support of such missions. The medal was first presented on 6 December 2010.

Ribbon	Campaign
	Awarded for service in South-West Asia
	Awarded for service in Sierra Leone
	Awarded for service in Haiti
	Awarded for service in Sudan
	Awarded for service in humanitas missions
	Awarded for service in expedition missions

== See also ==
- Canadian order of precedence (decorations and medals)
- Operational Service Medal (disambiguation)
