= Civilian Service Medal (Afghanistan) =

British campaign medal

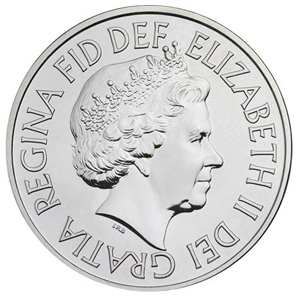
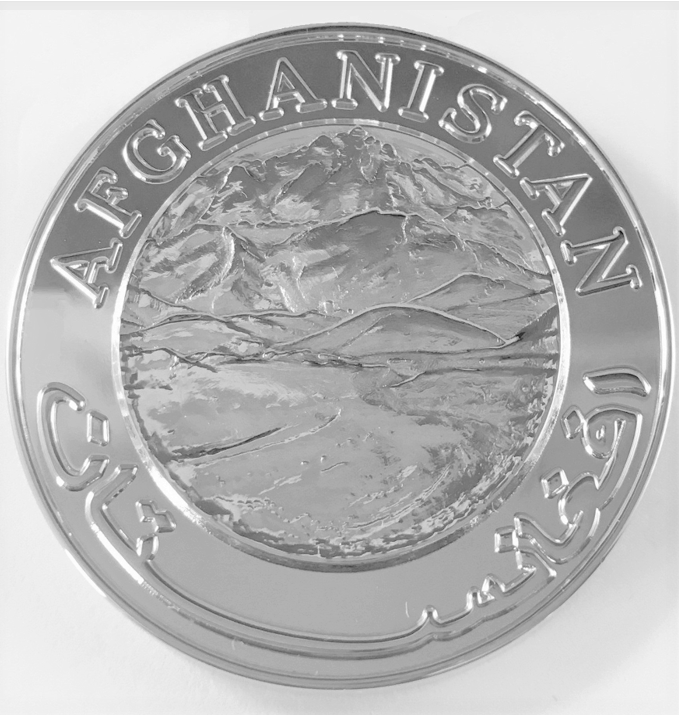
- Obverse and reverse of the medal
- Type: Campaign medal
- Awarded for: 30 days continuous service, or 45 days aggregate service over a period of one calendar year, in Afghanistan, since 19 November 2001
- Description: Cupro-nickel, 36 mm diameter
- Presented by: UK
- Eligibility: FCO civilian personnel, contractors
- Post-nominals: None
- Clasps: None
- Established: 6 April 2011

Highlights
- Total: 2469 (as of 28 February 2017)
- Ribbon bar
- Related: Operational Service Medal for Afghanistan; Iraq Reconstruction Service Medal

The Civilian Service Medal (Afghanistan) is awarded by the British government to civilians (and members of the UK Armed Forces in certain non-combat roles) to recognise service since 19 November 2001 in the transition to democracy in Afghanistan.

== Eligibility ==
The medal can be awarded to:

- Crown servants, whether recruited in the United Kingdom, Afghanistan or elsewhere, including members of the Armed Forces under operational control of the Foreign and Commonwealth Office (FCO), police officers, and contractors, directly employed by the British Government with, or in support of, an FCO Provisional Reconstruction Team or the British Embassy in Kabul;
- who have served in the geographical territory of Afghanistan on or after 19 November 2001, for 30 days continuously, or 45 days aggregated over a period of one calendar year (provided that the visits are for a minimum of 48 hours each).
- There was no minimum qualifying period for those killed, captured, wounded or disabled during service, or where a recipient received a British honour or decoration, provided the individual had originally been expected to complete the qualifying period.
- The medal was not awarded to those eligible for the Operational Service Medal for Afghanistan.
- Locally employed civilians were not eligible.
- Those employed on or providing material support to Operation Pitting such as Home Office, Border Force and FCO officials.

== Description ==
- The Civilian Service Medal (Afghanistan) is circular (36.07 mm in diameter and 4 mm thick), struck in cupro-nickel with a rhodium plating/coating.
- It has the Ian Rank-Broadley effigy of Queen Elizabeth II with the wording ELIZABETH II DEI GRATIA REGINA FID DEF on the obverse and an Afghanistan mountain scene with the word Afghanistan written in Latin and Arabic lettering on the reverse. The recipient's name is inscribed on the rim.
- The medal has a plain, straight suspender. The 32 millimetre-wide ribbon is sand-coloured with a broad green central stripe and narrow pale grey stripes towards each edge. The ribbon is the same as for the Iraq Reconstruction Service Medal but with grey, rather than blue thin stripes.

== Post-nominal letters ==
The medal carries no rights to the use of post-nominal letters.
