= Lisa Townsend =

Surrey Police and Crime Commissioner (born 1980)

Surrey Police and Crime Commissioner
- Incumbent
- Assumed office 13 May 2021
- Preceded by: David Munro

Personal details
- Born: January 1980 (age 46)
- Party: Conservative
- Education: Sheffield Hallam University; University College London
- Website: www.lisatownsend.org.uk

Lisa Townsend (born January 1980) has been the Surrey Police and Crime Commissioner (PCC) since May 2021.

== Background and career ==
She graduated from Sheffield Hallam University with a degree in law and completed a master's degree in law at University College London. She previously stood for the Conservative Party in Norwich South at the 2015 United Kingdom general election.

Townsend replaced David Munro after she was elected with a total of 155,116 votes, ahead of the second candidate by 42,951 votes. In May 2024 Townsend was re elected as PCC for Surrey.

Townsend worked for the Institute of Directors, until her election as PCC. She had previously worked for several MPs at Westminster.
