= David Munro (police commissioner) =

British police commissioner (born 1948)

Major David Munro

Surrey Police and Crime Commissioner
- In office 12 May 2016 – 12 May 2021
- Preceded by: Kevin Hurley
- Succeeded by: Lisa Townsend

Chairman of Surrey County Council
- In office 21 May 2013 – 19 May 2015
- Succeeded by: Sally Marks

Personal details
- Born: David John Munro; July 1948 (age 77)
- Party: Independent
- Other political affiliations: Conservative (1995–2019)

Military service
- Allegiance: United Kingdom
- Branch/service: The Corps of Royal Engineers
- Years of service: 1973-1991
- Rank: Major

David John Munro (born July 1948) was Surrey Police and Crime Commissioner (PCC) from 2016 to 2021. A former Conservative PCC, he stood as an independent candidate in 2021 and was defeated.

== Background and career ==
He was educated at Bishop Wordsworth's School and Peterhouse, Cambridge, where he read Engineering and History, graduating in 1972. He spent 18 years in the Royal Engineers, rising to the rank of major. After leaving the military — partly due to his sexuality, as LGBTQ+ personnel could not serve openly in the UK until 2000 — he was approached and interviewed for a further career in espionage but being gay meant that MI5 were not interested in interviewing him further.

He was elected to Waverley Borough Council and to Farnham Town Council in 1995, having been a Conservative activist since 1987, and to Surrey County Council in 1997, standing down shortly after being elected as PCC.

In December 2018, he was unsuccessful in his bid to gain automatic reselection as the Conservative candidate; the following March he lost his reselection battle to Charlotte Chirico, a solicitor. After his deselection, he left the Conservative group at the Association of PCCs to join the independents. In September 2019 he was expelled from the Conservative Party for having “campaigned against Conservative Party candidates”, which he denied. The next PCC elections had been scheduled for 7 May 2020 but, due to the COVID-19 pandemic in England, the elections were postponed to May 2021, with a further party reselection in February 2021 choosing Lisa Townsend as the Conservative candidate against him.

== Personal life ==
Munro is openly gay and has been in a relationship — and subsequently a civil partnership — with a professor of classics since before he left the army.
