= General Service Medal (1918) =

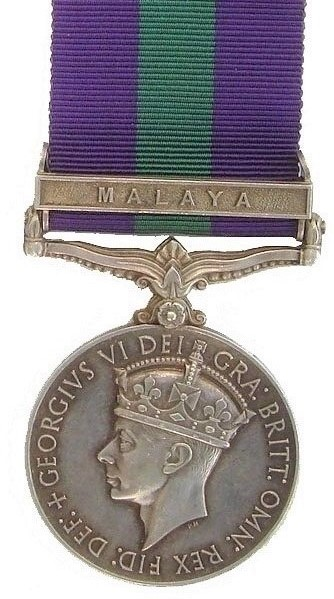
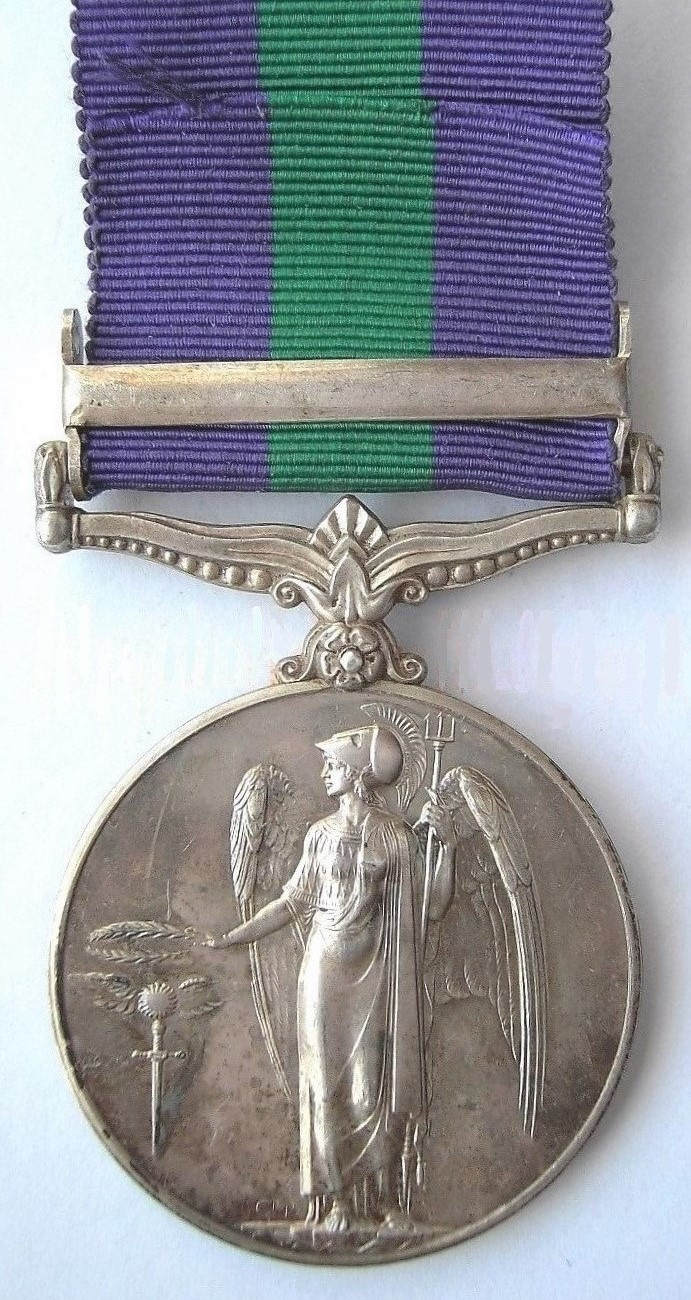
- Obverse and reverse of the medal.
- Type: Campaign medal
- Awarded for: Campaign service.
- Description: Silver disc, 36 mm diameter.
- Presented by: United Kingdom
- Eligibility: British Army and Royal Air Force.
- Campaign: Minor campaigns 1918–62.
- Clasps: 18
- Established: 19 January 1923
- Ribbon: Purple with a central green stripe. Ribbon with bronze oak leaf for a mention in dispatches (1920 onwards)
- Related: Naval General Service Medal (1915), General Service Medal (1962)

The General Service Medal (1918 GSM) was instituted to recognise service in minor Army and Royal Air Force operations for which no separate medal was intended. Local forces, including police, qualified for many of the clasps, as could units of the Indian Army prior to 1947.

The GSM was equivalent to the 1915 Naval General Service Medal. Both these medals were replaced by the General Service Medal in 1962.

== Description ==
The 1918 GSM is a circular silver medal, 36 mm (1.4 in) in diameter, with following design:

- The obverse shows the crowned effigy of the reigning monarch with an appropriate inscription.
- The reverse bears the standing winged figure of Victory in a Corinthian helmet and carrying a trident, bestowing a wreath on the emblems of the Army (the sword) and the RAF (the wings). It was designed by E Carter Preston.
- The 32 mm (1.3 in) wide ribbon has three equal stripes of purple, dark green and purple.
- The service number, rank, name and regiment or corps of the recipient are impressed on the rim of the medal in small block capitals.

A bronze oak leaf emblem is worn on the ribbon of the medal to signify a mention in dispatches or King's/Queen's Commendation for a campaign for which the GSM was awarded.

== Clasps ==
A total of eighteen clasps were awarded, the medal never being awarded without a clasp. The clasps consist of silver bars bearing the name of the relevant campaign or theatre of operations. They were attached to the medal's suspension bar.

Where a minimum qualifying period was laid down for a clasp, it did not apply to those killed or wounded due to operations, or to those decorated for bravery or distinguished conduct, including a mention in dispatches and a Queen's Commendation.

The clasps and the award criteria for each are:

- S. Persia

- Service at or near Bushire with Major-General J.A. Douglas and Brigadier-General A. M. S. Elsmie from 12 November 1918 – 22 June 1919
- Service at or near Bandar Abbas with Major-General Sir Percy Sykes or Lieutenant Colonel E.F. Orton from 12 November 1918 – 3 June 1919

- Kurdistan

This clasp was awarded for the following:
- At Kirkuk or north of a line east and west through Kirkurk between 23 May and 31 July 1919.
- At Dohok or north of a line east and west through Dohok between 14 July and 7 October 1919.
- At or north of the advanced bases near Akra and Amadia between 7 November and 6 December 1919.

Army Order No. 387 of 1924 and Army Instruction (India) No. 132 of 1925 extended eligibility for this clasp to cover further operations in Kurdistan under Air Marshal Sir J.M. Salmond

- Colonel Commandant B. Vincent between 19 March and 18 June 1923.
- Operations under Colonel Commandant H.T. Dobbin between 27 March and 28 April 1923.

- Iraq

This clasp was presented to those who satisfied one of the following conditions:
- Served at Ramadi or north of a line east and west through Ramadi between 10 December 1919 and 13 June 1920.
- Part of an establishment within Iraq between 1 July and 17 November 1920.

- N.W. Persia

Awarded to members of NoPerForce (North Persia Force) and those on various lines of communications serving under Brigadier-General Hugh Bateman-Champain from 10 August to 31 December 1920.

- Southern Desert Iraq

Awarded to the RAF for its services against the Akhwan in the Southern Desert, under the command of Air Commodore T.C.R. Higgins between 8 and 22 January 1928, or under the command of Wing Commander E.R.C. Nanson between 22 January and 3 June 1928.

- Northern Kurdistan

For operations against Sheikh Admed of Barzan in the area Diana – Erbil – Aqra – Suri due north to the Turkish frontier, between 15 March and 21 June 1932. Awarded to the RAF and to British military personnel serving with Iraqi Forces. No British Army units were present.

- Palestine

For service in the British Mandate of Palestine between 19 April 1936 and 3 September 1939, during the Arab Revolt. Awarded to both Military and Civil personnel, such as British section of Palestine Police Force.

- S.E. Asia 1945–46

For service in South-East Asia after the end of World War Two, for duties including guarding Japanese POWs, maintaining law and order and engagement in combat against enemy combatants in French Indochina or the Dutch East Indies. By November 1946 the British, Dominion, Colonial and Indian Forces involved had handed over their responsibilities to the territories former colonial powers. The qualifying dates were:
- Dutch East Indies (Java and Sumatra): 3 September 1945 to 30 November 1946.
- French Indochina: 3 September 1945 to 28 January 1946.

- Bomb and Mine Clearance 1945–49

Awarded for an aggregated total of 180 days active engagement in the removal of mines and bombs in the UK between 9 May 1945 and 31 December 1949.

- Bomb and Mine Clearance 1945–56

Awarded for an aggregated total of 180 days active engagement in the removal of mines and bombs in the following locations between 9 May 1945 and 10 November 1956 by Australian Army personnel only:

- (a) Solomon Islands (Australian Mandate and British Protectorate)
- (b) New Guinea (Trust territory)
- (c) Papua

note – if the Bomb and Mine Clearance 1945–49 clasp had already been issued it was to be replaced with this clasp, not issued in addition to.

- Palestine 1945–48

For service in the British Mandate of Palestine between 27 September 1945 (the date a "state of emergency" was declared) and 30 June 1948 (when the last British troops departed). It was issued to members of the British and Indian Forces and also civil personnel, such as British section of Palestine Police Force.

- Berlin Airlift

As a result of the 2012 Independent Medal Review conducted by Sir John Holmes, from 1 March 2015 a Berlin Airlift clasp has been awarded to RAF or civilian aircrew with at least one day's service in the Berlin Airlift operation from 25 June 1948 to 6 October 1949 inclusive.

In 2020, the Committee on the Grant of Honours, Decorations and Medals decided against granting the clasp to ground crew involved in the airlift.

- Malaya

For service in Malaya and Singapore against communist guerrilla forces.
The qualifying dates for service were between 16 June 1948 and 31 July 1960. For the Colony of Singapore, the date period was between 16 June 1948 to 31 January 1959.

It was issued to members of the British, Commonwealth and Colonial Forces and Civil personnel, for example as the Malayan Police Force.

- Canal Zone

Awarded for 30 days continuous service between 16 October 1951 – 19 October 1954 within certain specified geographical boundaries in Egypt. This clasp was awarded some 50 years later in October 2003 following representation to the then Prime Minister, Tony Blair.

- Cyprus

For involvement in the suppression of acts of terrorism during the guerrilla war with the EOKA organisation, who wanted Cyprus’s union with Greece (called "Enosis"). The conflict involved approximately 40,000 British troops over 4 years.

It was issued to members of the British Military Forces and Civil personnel, for example the Cyprus Police Force.

The clasp was originally awarded for 120 days service between 1 April 1955 to 18 April 1959. As a result of the 2012 Independent Medal Review conducted by Sir John Holmes, from 1 October 2014 the qualifying period was reduced to 90 days service, to bring it into line with the Africa General Service Medal awarded for the Kenya campaign.

- Near East

This clasp was awarded for service in Egypt during the period 31 October to 22 December 1956. This conflict is often referred to as the Suez Crisis, or by its codename of Operation Musketeer.

It was issued to members of the British Armed Forces and selected civil personnel.

- Arabian Peninsula

Due to a disagreement about land and associated oil rights, the Iman of Oman rebelled against the Sultan of Muscat. After initial setbacks, in 1955 the Sultan called for assistance from UK forces. It was not until British special forces were deployed that the rebels were dislodged from their territory in the Jebel Akhbar mountains.
The qualifying period for this clasp is 30 days' service between 1 January 1957 and 30 June 1960, in the Aden Colony or protectorate and the Sultanates of Muscat and Oman, or any of the adjacent Gulf states.

- Brunei

For a minimum 1 days' service in at least one of the operational areas located in the State of Brunei, North Borneo or Sarawak between 8 and 23 December 1962.

It was issued to members of the British Armed Forces, specially approved civilians and civil police forces, such as the Sarawak Police Force.

== Obverse variations ==
There were six obverses. The Malaya clasp could be awarded with the George VI (2nd type) or with either Elizabeth II version.

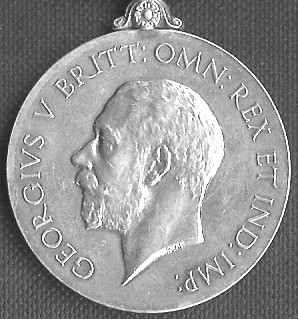
King George V coinage head (1918–1928)

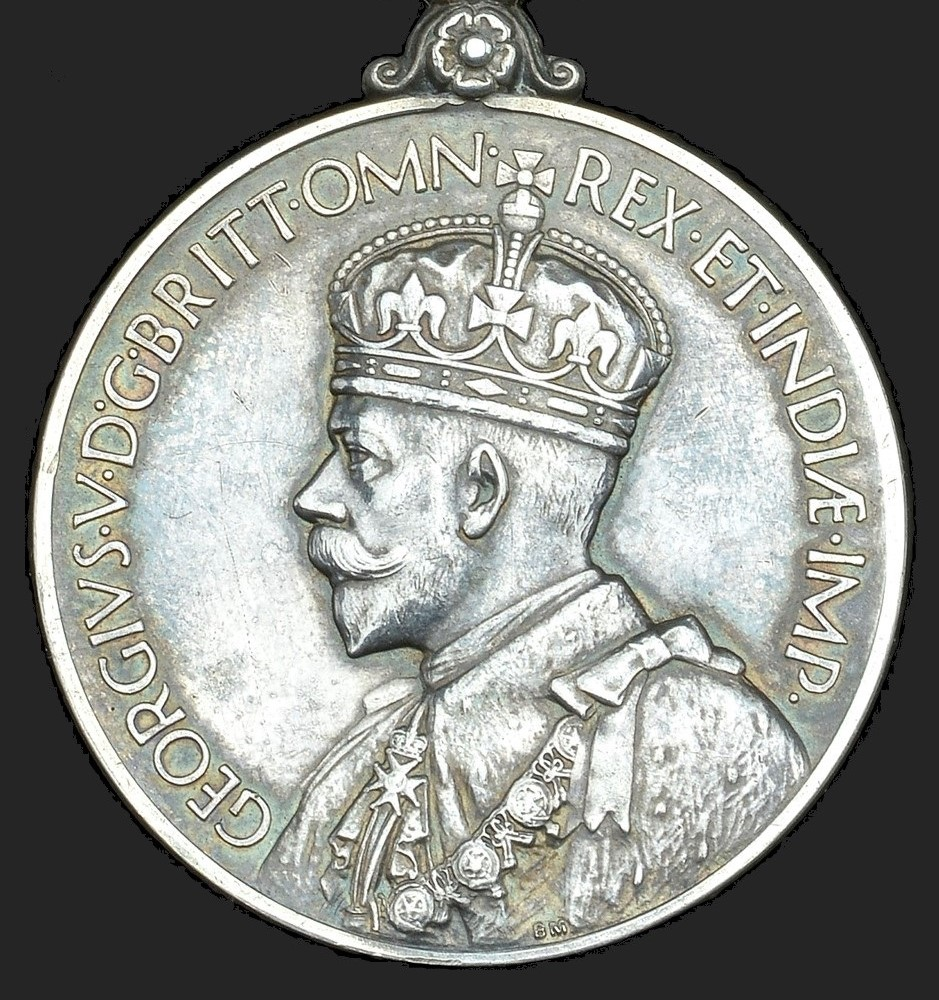
King George V robed bust (1932)

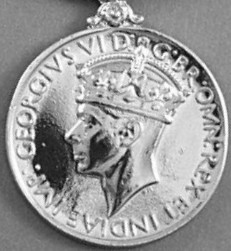
King George VI INDIAE IMP (1937–1949)

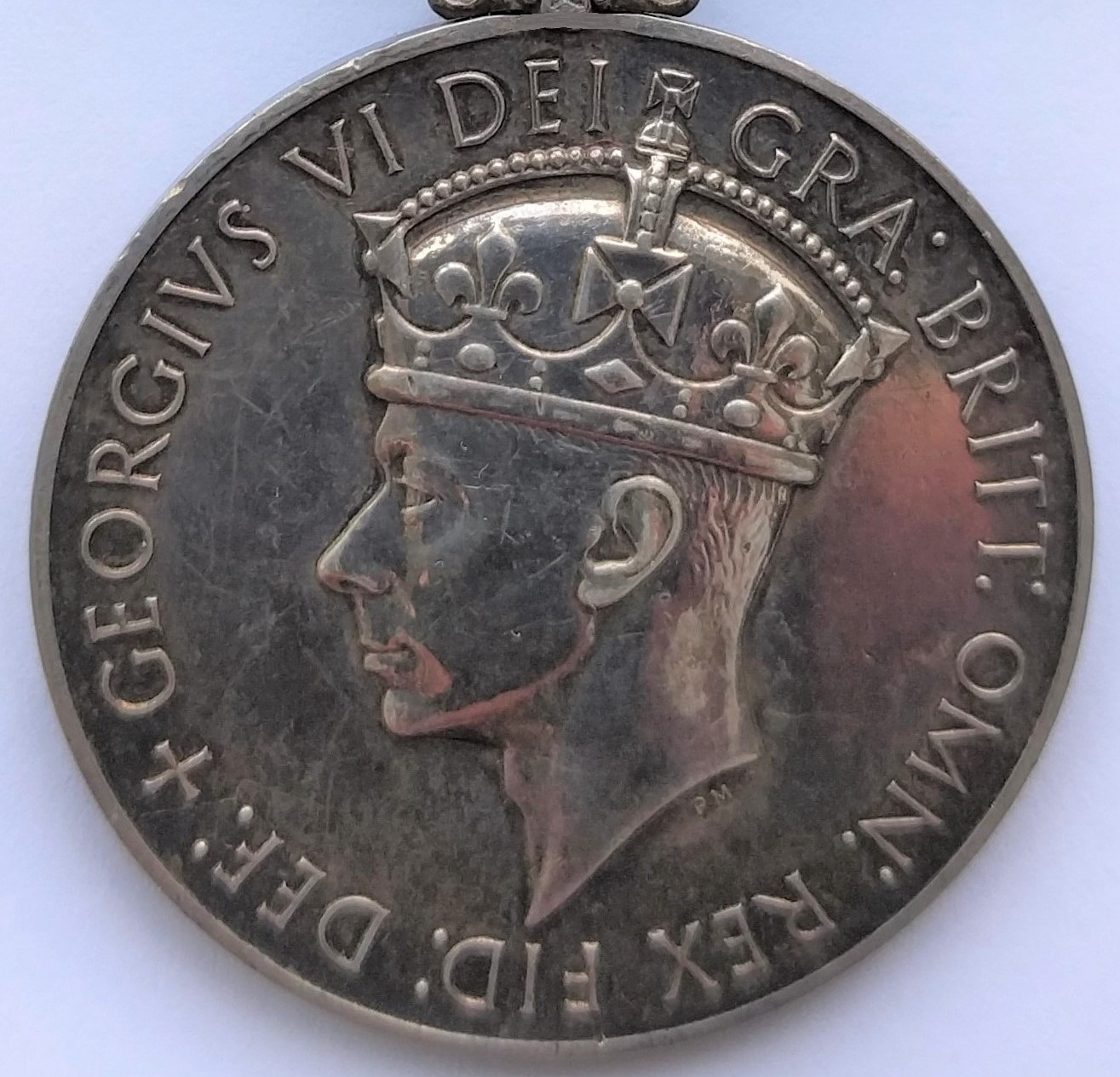
George VI (2nd type) Omits INDIAE IMP (1949–1952)

Queen Elizabeth II BR:OMN (1952–1954)

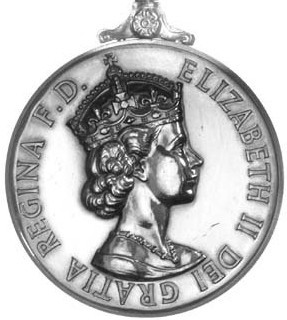
Queen Elizabeth II DEI GRATIA (1955–1962)

== Bibliography ==
- Mussel, J (ed) – Medals Yearbook – 2015, (2014), Token Publishing.
- Joslin, Litherland, and Simpkin (eds), British Battles and Medals, (1988), Spink
