= General Service Medal (2008) =

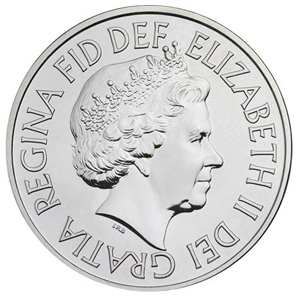
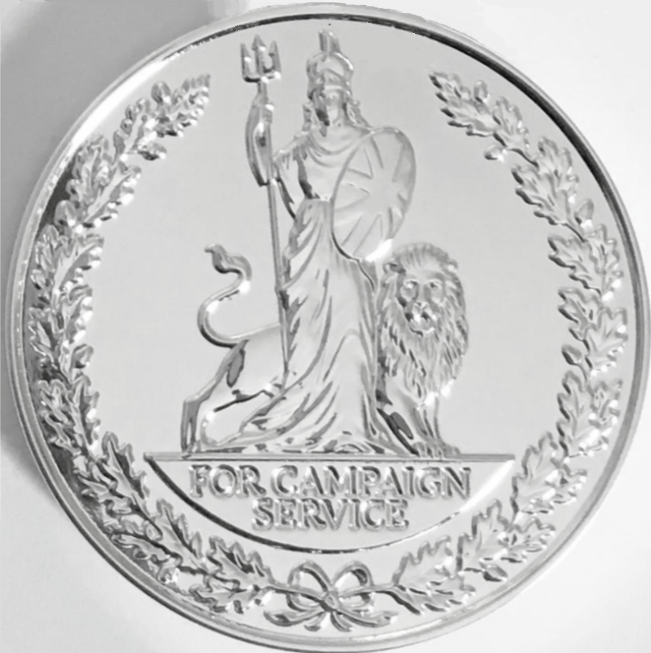
- Obverse and reverse of the medal
- Type: Campaign medal
- Awarded for: Campaign service.
- Description: Silver disk, 36 mm diameter.
- Presented by: the United Kingdom
- Eligibility: British forces.
- Campaign: Minor campaigns 2008–present
- Clasps: Southern Asia; Arabian Peninsula; Northern Africa; Western Africa; Eastern Africa; Gulf of Aden; Global Operations
- Established: 2015
- First award: 12 June 2016
- Service ribbon of the medal
- Related: General Service Medal (1918); General Service Medal (1962)

The General Service Medal 2008 (GSM 08) was introduced in 2015 for award to Royal Navy, Royal Marines, Army, and RAF personnel to recognise specified operations since January 2008, not qualifying for another campaign medal. Unlike its predecessor, the General Service Medal (1962), operations will be denoted by clasps indicating the geographic area of operations, rather than a specific operation. The first awards of the medal were made by Secretary of State for Defence Michael Fallon at a ceremony on 12 June 2016.

== Appearance ==
The GSM 08 is a circular silver medal, 36 millimetres (1.4 in) in diameter.
The obverse features the Ian Rank-Broadley effigy of Elizabeth II, with the inscription ELIZABETH II DEI GRATIA REGINA FID DEF.
The reverse bears a design featuring a figure of Britannia holding a trident standing ahead of a lion, symbolising Britain, with, below, the inscription FOR CAMPAIGN SERVICE, with the whole encircled by an oak leaf wreath.
The suspension bar is the same design as those of the GSM 1918–62 and GSM 1962, as are the colours of the 32 mm (1.26 in) wide ribbon, which is dark green with a purple stripe towards each edge.

== Clasps ==
The clasps for the medal are named based on the geographic region of operations and not for specific named operations. Further operations deemed sufficient to warrant the award of the medal will see the addition of more clasps. Service in subsequent qualifying operations is reflected by additional clasps added to the existing GSM medal.

The clasps and their qualifying periods of service are as follows:

Southern Asia

- Operation VERDITER (LEEWAY) (Pakistan), 1 January 2008 – 6 May 2015 EOD Short Term Training Team

Arabian Peninsula

- Operation QUANTAM, 1 January 2009 – 21 May 2012
- Operation ICENI, 1 June 2012 – 2 December 2013

Northern Africa

- Operation DEFERENCE (Libya), 21 February – 22 March 2011
- Operation VOCATE (Libya), 11 November 2011 – present

Western Africa

- Operation NEWCOMBE (Mali), 13 January – 22 May 2013
- Operation NEWCOMBE (Mali), 28 February 2018 – present

Eastern Africa

- Operation TANGHAM (Somalia) including:
  - Headquarters Op TANGHAM (1 November 2013 – present)
  - Somali National Army (SNA) Training and Advisory Team (STAT); formerly included in Op BACKWELL (24 April 2012 – present).
  - African Union Mission in Somalia (AMISOM) Mission Support Team (MST); formerly included in Op BACKWELL (24 April 2012 – present).
  - United Nations Support Team (UNST); formerly Op CATAN (3 March 2016 – present).
  - Comprehensive Approach to Security (CAS) Strand 2A; formerly Op PRESIDIUM.
  - Government Provided Personnel to UN; formerly Op PRAISER (16 December 2014 – present).
  - European Union Training Mission-Somalia (EUTM-S); formally Op MODEST (24 January 2013 – 1 February 2020).

Gulf of Aden

- Task Force 50, October–November 2016 (Note: Awarded to Royal Navy and Royal Marines personnel serving aboard HMS Daring during escort missions through the Gulf of Aden)
- Operation PROSPERITY GUARDIAN, November 2023-June 2024.

Global Operations

- Operations undertaken outside those covered by other specified medals or clasps, including, but not limited to, operations undertaken by submariners outside individual conflicts (2008 onwards) (Note: The specific criteria for the award of the Global Operations clasp have not been released)
