= Iraq Reconstruction Service Medal =

British service medal

- Obverse and reverse of the medal
- Type: Campaign medal
- Awarded for: Campaign service
- Description: Cupro-nickel, 36 mm diameter
- Presented by: UK and Commonwealth
- Eligibility: British and Commonwealth forces, civilian personnel
- Campaign: Iraq
- Clasps: None
- Established: 26 June 2004, distributed from 2007
- Final award: 1 October 2013

Highlights
- Total recipients: 3,800+
- Ribbon bar of the medal
- Related: Iraq Medal (United Kingdom)

The Iraq Reconstruction Service Medal was a British service medal distributed by the Foreign and Commonwealth Office. It was awarded to civilian public servants, contractors and consultants, and to members of the Armed Forces working with British Government Departments, who were either appointed, deployed or employed by Her Majesty's Government (HMG) to work in Iraq, and who had served at least 40 days.

== Description ==
The medal, produced by the Royal Mint, has the following design:

- It is circular, of rhodium plated cupro-nickel, 36 mm in diameter.
- The obverse has the Ian Rank-Broadley effigy of Elizabeth II, with the legend "ELIZABETH II DEI GRATIA REGINA FID.DEF.".
- On the reverse are cuneiform symbols which can be roughly translated as “land bringing forth life”, with the stylised depiction of two rivers, based on a relief carving from Mesopotamia in the British Museum. Below is the word "IRAQ".
- The recipient's name is inscribed on rim of the medal.
- The 32 mm wide ribbon is sand-coloured with a broad green central stripe and narrow blue stripes towards each edge.

== Qualifying ==
The Iraq Reconstruction Service Medal was not awarded for service that also qualified for the Iraq military (campaign) Medal, although both medals could be awarded for different periods and types of service.

Those eligible:

- Civilian Public Servants and those who hold the office of Constable, appointed by HMG to serve in Iraq with, or in support of, the Coalition Provisional Authority (CPA), British Office Baghdad (BOB) or British Embassy (including their Regional Offices).
- Civilian Public Servants deployed by HMG to work alongside coalition/multinational forces in Iraq.
- Members of the Armed Forces, working with or seconded to HMG Departments.
- Contractors and their employees directly employed by HMG on a full-time basis to work for, or in support of the CPA, BOB or British Embassy (including their Regional Offices), or to work alongside coalition/multinational forces in Iraq for HMG.
- Any Foreign and Commonwealth nationals who qualify under the above provisions. Locally employed civilians were not eligible for the medal.

Time period:

- Awarded for the period 19 March 2003 to 1 October 2013. Eligibility required 40 days continuous service, or 40 days on working visits within Iraq, aggregated over a period of one calendar year, provided that the visits were for a minimum of 48 hours each.
- There was no minimum qualifying period for those killed, wounded or disabled during service, or where a recipient received a British honour or decoration.

== Clasps ==
- There are no clasps for this medal

== See also ==
- Iraq Medal (United Kingdom)
- 2003 invasion of Iraq
