= General Service Medal (1962) =

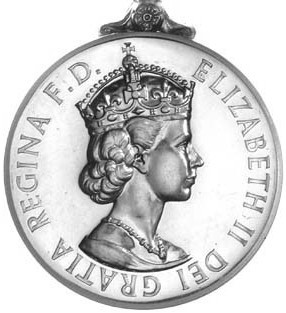
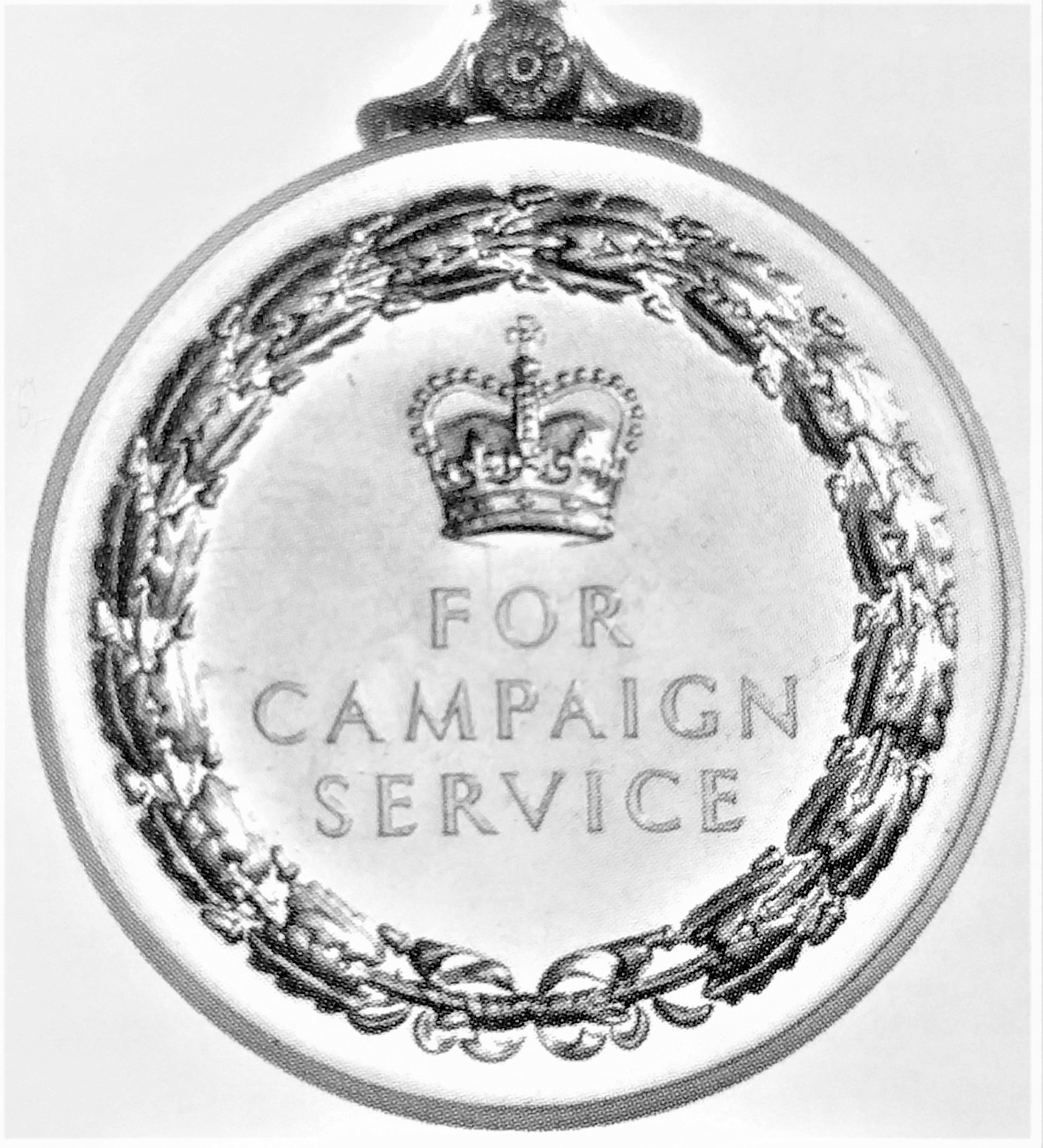
- Obverse (left), reverse (right)
- Type: Campaign medal
- Awarded for: Campaign service.
- Description: Silver disk, 36 mm diameter.
- Presented by: United Kingdom and the Commonwealth
- Eligibility: British and Commonwealth forces.
- Campaign: Minor campaigns 1962–2007
- Clasps: Cyprus 1963–64; Borneo; Radfan; South Arabia; Malay Peninsula; South Vietnam; Northern Ireland; Dhofar; Lebanon; Mine Clearance, Gulf of Suez; Gulf; Kuwait; N. Iraq & S. Turkey; Air Operations Iraq
- Established: 6 October 1962
- Ribbon Ribbon with bronze oak leaf for a mention in dispatches
- Related: Naval General Service Medal (1915), General Service Medal (1918), General Service Medal (2008)

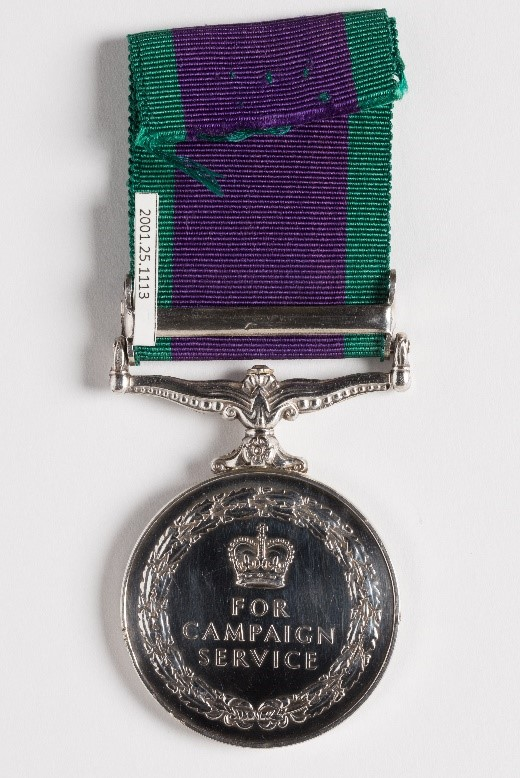
Reverse of 1962 GSM awarded for Borneo, to Cpl Waretini, New Zealand Forces

The General Service Medal (1962 GSM, erroneously often referred to as the Campaign Service Medal), is a campaign medal of the United Kingdom introduced in 1962 to replace both the General Service Medal (1918), as awarded to the Army and RAF, and the Naval General Service Medal (1915). The 1962 GSM was awarded until 2007, when it was replaced by the Operational Service Medal. In 2015 the General Service Medal (2008) was introduced.

The 1962 GSM was awarded for what were often arduous campaigns and well fought operations, evidenced by the casualties that were frequently sustained.

== Description ==
The 1962 GSM is a circular silver medal, 36 mm (1.4 in) in diameter with the following design:

- The obverse shows the crowned effigy of Queen Elizabeth II with the inscription ELIZABETH II DEI GRATIA REGINA F.D.
- The reverse bears the words 'FOR CAMPAIGN SERVICE' under a crown, all surrounded by a wreath of oak leaves.
- The 32 mm (1.3 in) wide ribbon is purple with two outer stripes of dark green. These are the same colours as the GSM 1918–62, but in different proportions.
- The name, rank, service number and regiment or corps of the awardee are annotated on the rim of the medal.

Those mentioned in despatches or who received a Queen’s Commendation during a campaign qualifying for the 1962 GSM wear an oak leaf symbol on the medal ribbon.

Service qualifying for the 1962 GSM after 14 August 1969 counted towards the period required to receive the Accumulated Campaign Service Medal.

== Clasps ==
Fourteen clasps were awarded, the medal never being awarded without a clasp. The maximum awarded to any one individual appears to have been six. There is documentary evidence of a 6-clasp GSM. Clasps are worn in the order that the recipient qualified for them, not the date of the relevant Army Order.

There was no minimum qualifying period for each clasp for those killed, wounded or disabled during operations, or where a recipient was decorated for operational service, including a mention in dispatches and a Queen’s Commendation.

=== Cyprus 1963–64 ===
As a result of the 2012 Independent Medal Review conducted by Sir John Holmes, from 1 March 2015 this clasp was awarded to those servicemen who served in Cyprus from 21 December 1963 to 26 March 1964. Personnel who have served on a tour of duty after this time receive the United Nations Medal as part of the United Nations Peacekeeping Force in Cyprus, who took over peacekeeping duties from 1964.

=== Borneo ===
Awarded to British, Australian and New Zealand land, sea and air forces who fought Indonesian soldiers, marines and irregular elements in Sabah (North Borneo) and Sarawak in East Malaysia, during Indonesian-Malaysian Confrontation including Operation Claret. Eligibility required 30 days service or, for aircrew, 1 operational sortie between 24 December 1962 and 11 August 1966.
This conflict claimed the lives of 114 Commonwealth personnel with 180 wounded. Recipients were subsequently awarded and given permission to wear the Malaysian Pingat Jasa Malaysia.

=== Radfan ===
Awarded to service personnel who served for at least 14 days between 25 April and 31 July 1964 in the campaign in the Radfan Mountains, mounted with South Arabia Federation troops against the Egyptian/Yemeni backed Radfan tribesmen. They were quickly and effectively defeated. Those taking part included a brigade size army force, members of 815 Naval Air Squadron, sailors on HMS Centaur, and RAF aircrew. In 1967 eligibility was widened to include those who served in a supporting role in Aden.

=== South Arabia ===
This campaign during the Aden Emergency is related to the Radfan Campaign, because both were Egyptian-inspired attempts to end the British presence in Aden and end the embryonic Federation of South Arabia. This 3-year long campaign saw numerous terrorist attacks on both civilian and military targets. In both Radfan and Aden, the British Army suffered 90 personnel killed and 510 wounded.
The qualifying period was 30 days service in the Federation of South Arabia between 1 August 1964 and 30 November 1967.

=== Malay Peninsula ===
This campaign was an extension of the conflict in Borneo where British and Malaysian troops were operating against Indonesian insurgents. In 1964, Indonesia attacked the Malaysian mainland, with parachute landings in Johore while other troops landed across the Malacca Straits from Indonesian Sumatra. It was for operations in Malaysia and surrounding waters against these troops that this clasps was instituted, as opposed to the concurrent Borneo operations.
The qualifying period was 30 days' service (or 30 sorties) in the Malaysian Peninsula-Singapore area between 17 August 1964 to 12 June 1965 for ground forces, and to 11 August 1966 for air crew. The qualifying period does not include jungle training prior to deployment to combat operations even if the training took place in Borneo. Personnel based on Singapore from 8 August 1965 also did not qualify as Singapore, which had been a part of the Federation of Malaysia, became independent.

Awards included approximately 20,000 clasps to the Royal Navy, 1,200 to the Royal Australian Navy and 300 to the Royal New Zealand Navy, with about 6,500 to the RAF. The bulk of the Army units present were drawn from the Brigade of Gurkhas.

=== South Vietnam ===
This clasp for service during the Vietnam War was instituted by Royal approval on 16 December 1965 for "members of our Australian Armed Forces who qualify by participation in operations in defence of the Republic of Vietnam as from 24 December 1962, and to a date to be determined...". Between 1963 and 1965, at least 68 members of the Australian Army Training Team Vietnam (AATTV) and 232 members of the RAAF Transport Flight Vietnam qualified for the clasp. However, a decision in 1966 relating to the institution and award of the Vietnam Medal led to the stripping of the award from the RAAF personnel. A Royal Warrant dated 8 June 1968 retrospectively changed the qualifying periods to:
Between 24 December 1962 and 29 May 1964:
- 30 days' service in ships operating in inland waters or off the Vietnamese coast.
- 1 day in the service of a land unit.
- 1 operational sortie.
- 30 days' service on an official visit.
For service after 29 May 1964, personnel were awarded the Vietnam Medal. Thus, only 68 clasps were issued, and all 68 went to AATTV members.
(the above statement is incorrect).
The clasp was also awarded to military staff at the UK embassy Saigon, and UK citizens serving within ADF.

=== Northern Ireland ===
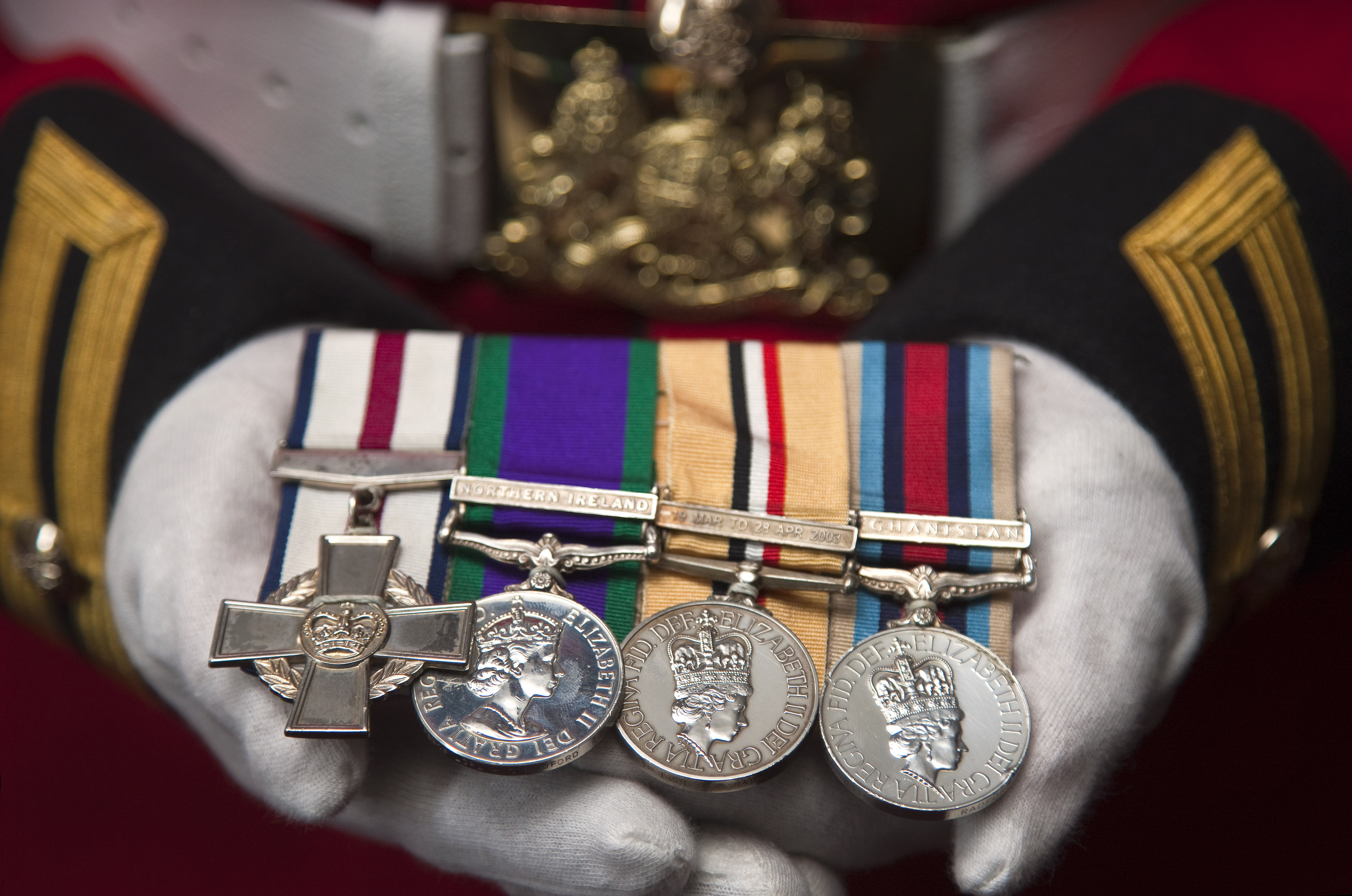
Soldier holding various medals, including a General Service Medal with Northern Ireland clasp (second from left)

This clasp was instituted for award to personnel involved in the various operations in Northern Ireland during The Troubles.
The qualifying period is a minimum of 30 days' service between 14 August 1969 and 31 July 2007. The 30 days' did not have to be consecutive. Should the qualifying period be cut short due to injury or death, then the completed days are counted as sufficient for the award of this clasp.
In the region of 300,000 medals were awarded with this clasp.

=== Dhofar ===
In 1965 the mountain tribesmen of Dhofar, a province of Oman, rose in revolt against the regime of Sultan Sa'ib bin Taimur. The revolt worsened in 1967 when the British left the adjacent State of Aden, with the new communist government in Yemen providing an important base for the rebels. With the Sultan clearly losing the war, his son staged a coup on 23 July 1970, after which he expanded the armed forces with British assistance.
The British Special Air Service (SAS) ostensibly provided training for local forces (BATT), but in reality was an operational fighting unit, the Royal Artillery installed mortar locating radars and a sound ranging base at Salalah, the Royal Engineers provided military and civil engineering, and RAF officers provided the backbone of the new Sultan's air force. The RAF Regiment, as well as airfield ground staff and the Royal Signals, were a continuous presence at the air base in Salalah from 1970 to 1976. Medical support was provide by Field Surgical Teams (FSTs) of the Royal Army Medical Corps (RAMC). In addition, many British officers were seconded to the Sultan's Armed Forces (SAF). Jordan and Iran also provided assistance.
During this period, the British forces suffered 24 killed and 55 wounded.
The qualifying period for the clasp was 30 days service between 1 October 1969 and 30 September 1976.

=== Lebanon ===
In June 1982, in an attempt to remove Palestinian Liberation Organisation bases which were attacking Israel, Israel invaded Lebanon, beginning the 1982 Lebanon War and advanced towards Lebanon's capital Beirut. However, they quickly became embroiled in Lebanon's sectarian violence.
In October 1982, the US-inspired multinational peacekeeping force for Lebanon was sent into Beirut. It was composed of troops from USA, France, Italy and UK. Though all the other contingents suffered casualties (241 US Marines in one attack and 58 French troops in another suicide attack), the British troops carried out their assignments with no loss of life. The force was increasingly becoming just a target for the various factions, and was withdrawn during February - March 1984.
Eligibility for the clasp required 30 days service or, for aircrew, three sorties, between 7 February 1983 and 9 March 1984 About 700 clasps were awarded.

=== Mine Clearance, Gulf of Suez ===
For 30 days accumulated service in the Gulf of Suez between 15 August 1984 and 15 October 1984.
In the summer of 1984, magnetic sea mines damaged at least 19 ships in the Red Sea. In response, six nations including the USA, UK and France launched Operation Intense Look, a minesweeping operation involving more than 46 ships.

=== Persian Gulf ===
For 30 days service between 17 November 1986 (first task group being led by HMS Nottingham) and 31 October 1988 in the Persian Gulf during the Iran–Iraq War. Royal Navy Ships tasked to the Armilla patrol escorted civilian shipping through the Straits of Hormuz whilst under serious threat from Iranian Forces. During this period 178 ships were attacked, 13,000,000 gross tons suffered damage. To combat extensive Iranian mining of the area the Task Group also carried out mine countermeasures in the Persian Gulf up to 28 February 1989.

=== Kuwait ===
For 30 days service in Kuwait after the liberation, between 8 March and 30 September 1991.

=== N. Iraq & S. Turkey ===
For 30 days service or three operational sorties between 6 April 1991 and 17 July 1991 in support of the coalition operations (Operation Provide Comfort) to defend Kurds fleeing their homes in northern Iraq in the aftermath of the Gulf War.

=== Air Operations Iraq ===
Awarded to RAF personnel, some members of the Army (mainly Royal Engineers and attached personnel) and to the Royal Navy for 60 days continuous or 90 days accumulated service, or six operational sorties, between 16 July 1991 and 30 April 2003 in support of the no fly zones over Iraq and airfield repair in Iraq. Also awarded to members of the Royal Fleet Auxiliary (RFA) who served on the Arabian Gulf Ready Tanker (AGRT) between these dates.

== Bibliography ==
- Mussell, J (ed). Medals Yearbook - 2015, (2016), Token Publishing.
- Joslin, Litherland, and Simpkin (eds). British Battles and Medals, (1988), Spink.
- Ministry of Defence. Honours and Awards in the Armed Forces. Part 1: Directive (JSP 761, V5.0 Oct 2016)
