= Operational Service Medal (United Kingdom) =

Group of campaign medals

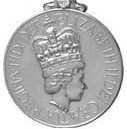
OSM: Common obverse

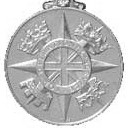
OSM: Common reverse

The Operational Service Medal (OSM) is the overall name given to a group of campaign medals awarded by the British armed forces. Introduced in 1999 to replace the General Service Medal, the OSM features a common design for the medal itself, with each one differentiated by a distinct ribbon.

As of March 2026, the Operational Service Medal has been awarded for four separate campaigns.

== Medal and ribbon ==
The medal itself is circular, with an effigy of Queen Elizabeth II and the inscription ELIZABETH II DEI GRATIA REGINA FID. DEF on the obverse. The reverse has a design featuring the Union Flag, surrounded by a circlet bearing the inscription FOR OPERATIONAL SERVICE, on top of a four pointed star representing the four cardinal points of the compass; in between the points, in line with the saltire of the Union Flag, are four coronets, representing the Crown and the three armed services - Royal (top left), Naval (Royal Navy, top right), Mural (British Army, bottom left), and Astral (Royal Air Force, bottom right).

The ribbon for each version of the medal follows the same format, with a wide red bar in the centre, flanked on each side by navy blue, and then light blue bars, representing the three services, with on the edge bars of a unique colour - green (Sierra Leone), buff (Afghanistan), ochre (Democratic Republic of Congo), grey (Iraq and Syria).

== Awards ==
=== OSM for Sierra Leone ===

The first OSM to be awarded was for service during Operation Palliser, the United Kingdom's intervention in the Sierra Leone Civil War from May 2000 to July 2002. No clasp was awarded, although personnel who took part in Operation Maidenly or Operation Barras were entitled to add a silver rosette to their award.

=== OSM for Afghanistan ===

The OSM for Afghanistan was awarded for service as part of the Afghan War, encompassing Operation Veritas, Operation Herrick and Operation Toral, and other operations included under those overall missions. Recipients of the medal are eligible to be awarded the Afghanistan clasp if they have served in Afghanistan itself for a period of time (which varies depending on the operation), and the Operation Pitting clasp for personnel assigned to the 2021 evacuation of Kabul.

=== OSM for the Democratic Republic of Congo ===

The OSM for the Democratic Republic of Congo was awarded to all British personnel that served between June and September 2003 on Operation Coral, the British involvement in the French-led multinational peacekeeping mission to the Democratic Republic of Congo, during the latter stages of the Second Congo War. The medal was awarded with the DROC clasp to all recipients.

=== OSM for Iraq & Syria ===

The OSM for Iraq and Syria was awarded for service as part of Operation Shader, the UK's involvement in the military intervention against ISIL in Iraq and Syria. This medal is the first campaign medal to be awarded to personnel not physically serving in the area of operations, as crews operating unmanned aerial vehicles on operations over Syria and Iraq were made eligible. Those personnel that do serve in the operational area itself are eligible to receive the Iraq & Syria clasp.
