= History of the Canadian Army =

The history of the Canadian Army, began when the title first came into official use in November 1940, during the Second World War, and is still used today. Although the official titles, Mobile Command, and later Land Force Command, were used from February 1968 to August 2011, "Canadian Army" continued to be unofficially used to refer to the ground forces of the Canadian Armed Forces, much as it has been from Confederation in 1867 to the present. The term was often even used in official military publications, for example in recruiting literature and the official newspaper of the Canadian Forces, The Maple Leaf. On August 16, 2011, the title, "Canadian Army", was officially restored, once again bringing the official designation in line with common and historical usage.

== Formation ==
Prior to Canadian Confederation in 1867, defence for the colonies that comprise present-day Canada was dependent on the armies of colonial powers. The military of New France (1608–1763) was dependent on the French Royal Army. Conversely, the defence of the English/British colonies of Newfoundland (1610–1907), and Nova Scotia (1654–1867) was dependent on the English/British Army. After the British conquest of New France in 1760, defence for the French colony of Canada (present-day Ontario, and Quebec), and St. John's Island was also reliant on the British Army. Both the British and French armies were augmented by locally recruited regulars, fencibles, and the Canadian militia. Many of these units were activated in times of war, but remained inactive in between.

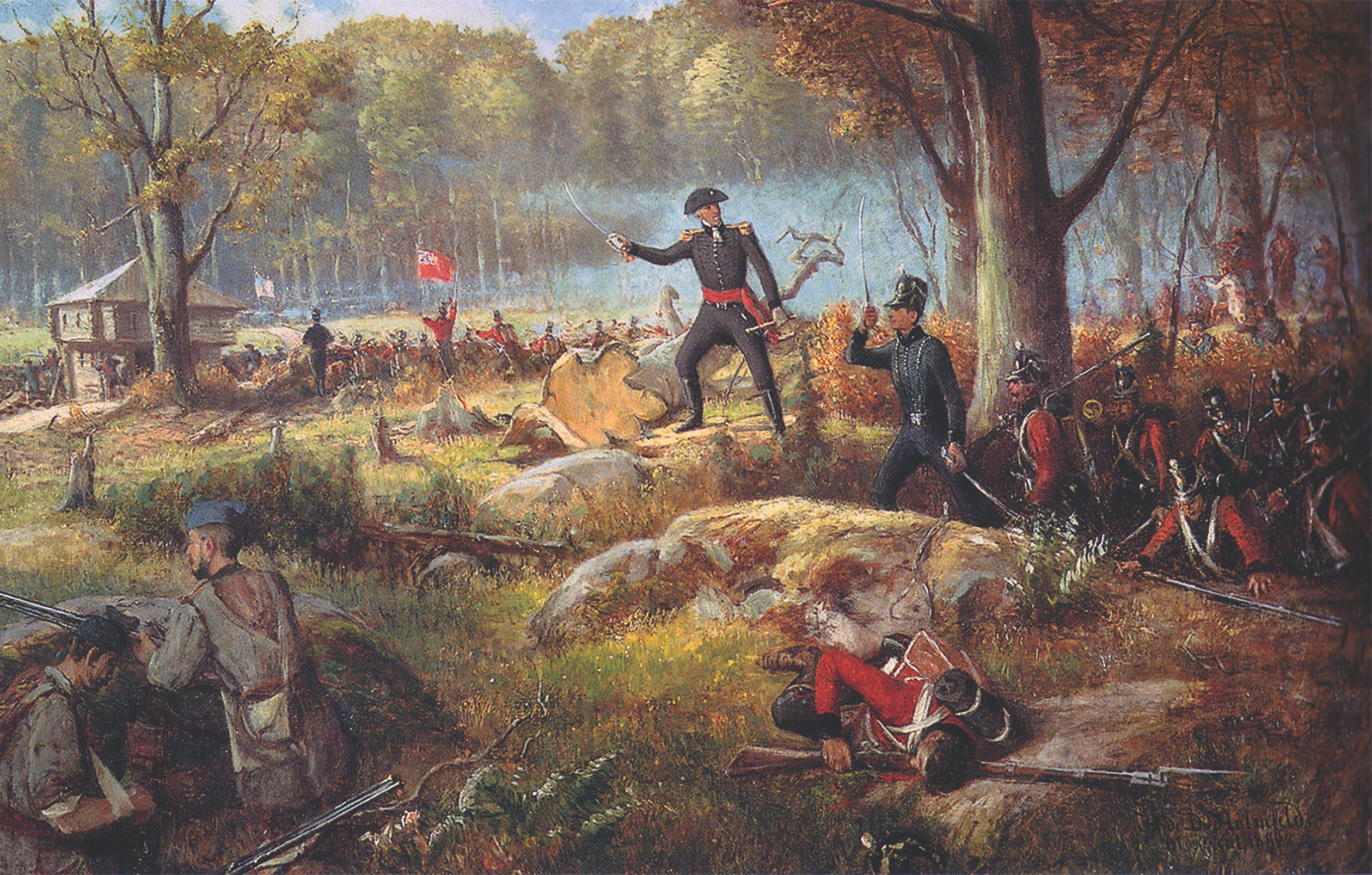
The Battle of Chateauguay during the War of 1812. In the battle, locally raised fencibles, militia, and Mohawk warriors, repulsed an American assault for Montreal.

During the War of 1812, locally raised Canadian units, including fencibles, and militia units from the Canadas, New Brunswick, Newfoundland, and Nova Scotia served alongside regular units of the British Army. These fencible and militia units played an instrumental role during the conflict. The history and heritage, as well as the War of 1812 battle honours awarded to many of these units, are perpetuated by current units within the Canadian Army.

While Canada developed a volunteer militia force of partially trained and often unpaid amateurs, defence of the country was dependent on a contingent of regular British soldiers, as well as naval defence through the Royal Navy. The Canadian Militia evolved from the various British garrison forces on the North American continent in the 19th century. In 1854, with the outbreak of the Crimean War, virtually the entire British garrison was pulled out of British North America to fight against Russia, and with many American politicians saying this was the opportune moment for the United States to realize its "manifest destiny" by annexing British North America, the government of the United Canadas, consisting of Canada West (modern Ontario) and Canada East (modern Quebec) passed the Militia Act of 1855 to create an active militia that was essentially a professional army, through not labelled as such. The "active militia" consisted of 5,000 men. The Canadian Army is a direct descendant of the "active duty militia" force created in 1855. Upon Canadian Confederation in 1867, the ground forces in Canada continued to be referred to as the Militia. Using the "active duty militia" of the United Canadas as its core, Parliament passed the Militia Act of 1868 merging the militias of New Brunswick and Nova Scotia into the militia of the United Canadas. In February 1869, the Defence minister, Sir George-Étienne Cartier, told the House of Commons that the Militia had 37,170 men under arms and 618,896 in reserve.

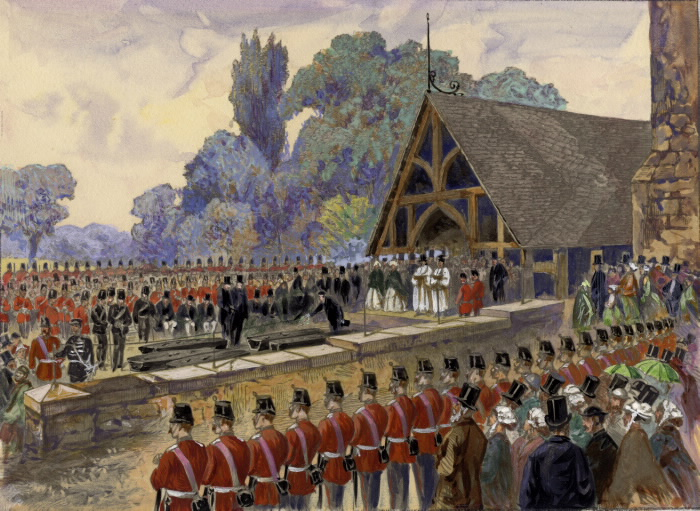
Funeral for members of the Volunteer Militias killed during the Battle of Ridgeway at St. James Cemetery, Toronto.

The primary action that the newly formed militia saw was from the Fenians, a group of Irish radicals who made several attempts in the late 19th century to invade some parts of southern Canada from the United States. The period of the Fenian raids in the 1860s and early 1870s was the peak of the efficiency of the Canadian militia. In 1866, at the Battle of Ridgeway the Fenians defeated the Canada West militia owing to the inexperience of the militiamen, but in 1870 the Quebec militia drove back the Fenians at Trout River and Eccles Hill with little trouble. In 1869, Canada purchased for $1.5 million the vast proprietary colony of Rupert's Land run by the Hudson's Bay Company that comprised all of northern Quebec, northern Ontario, Manitoba, Saskatchewan, Alberta, the Yukon, the Northwest Territories, and Nunavut. The 10,000 people, many of them Métis in the Red River Colony in what is now southern Manitoba, were not consulted about the sale, and under the leadership of Louis Riel rebelled, setting up a provisional government to negotiate their admission to Confederation. Donald Smith of the Hudson's Bay Company had been appointed to negotiate with Riel by Ottawa and arranged a settlement under which Canada would create a new province called Manitoba in exchange for the Métis laying down their arms. However, the execution of Thomas Scott, an Orangeman from Ontario, by the Métis, created much fury in Ontario, a province where the Loyal Orange Order was a major political force. To placate voters in Ontario, an expedition was sent to down the Red River Rebellion. In 1870, an Anglo-Canadian force consisting of the 400 men from British King's Royal Rifle Corps with the rest being Ontario militiamen, consisting of 1,044 men in total under the command of General Garnet Wolseley made a gruelling march across northern Ontario to the Red River colony. Riel fled and the rebellion ended without any fighting, and the terms already agreed upon between Smith and Riel were implemented with Manitoba becoming the 5th province.

After the Treaty of Washington (1871) and the end of the Fenian raids, the British began to downsize their garrisons in Canada, mainly to move troops to other areas of the Empire, but also due to friendlier relations with the United States, Canada's immediate neighbour, and the only country capable of launching an armed invasion of the country. In 1871, the British garrisons in Canada were almost completely pulled out with British garrisons remaining only in Halifax and Esquimalt. After 1871, the responsibility for the defence of Canada rested with the Dominion government.

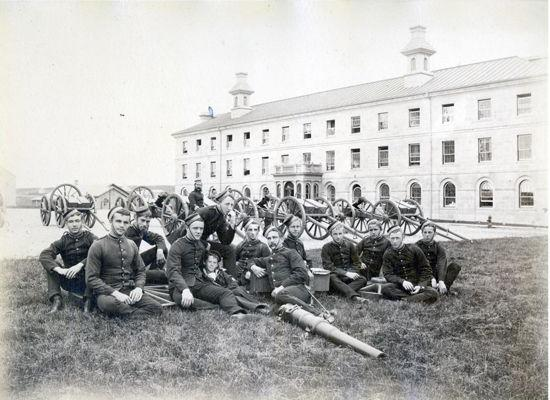
Cadets of the Royal Military College of Canada with several Armstrong Guns (c. 1885). The college was founded to train officers for the Permanent Active Militia.

This led to the designation of a Permanent Active Militia as the regular army of Canada (regular in the sense that they were full-time professional soldiers) and the Non-Permanent Active Militia (or reserves, part-time soldiers with vocations in the civilian world who trained on evenings, weekends, and for short periods in the summer months). The Canadian historian René Chartrand wrote: "The government's traditional policy was to spend as little as possible on defence while keeping up a basic military force". As maintaining the non-permanent active militia was the cheapest option, this was the one that Ottawa pursued.

In 1876, the Royal Military College was founded to train officers for the Permanent Active Militia. Owing to the lack of officers, British Army officers continued to be seconded to serve as the senior commanders of the militia. 'A' and 'B' Batteries of Garrison Artillery were formed as the first units of Canada's permanent military force in 1871 in Kingston and Quebec City respectively, with a third ('C' Battery) authorized in 1883 and formed in 1887 in Esquimalt. These batteries are now incorporated in the 1st Regiment Royal Canadian Horse Artillery. The Cavalry School Corps, which eventually became The Royal Canadian Dragoons, and the Infantry School Corps, which became The Royal Canadian Regiment, were both formed on 21 December 1883.

The militia stagnated after the early 1870s when the fear of the Fenian Brotherhood ended. The major task of the militia was as aid to civil power with the militia frequently been called out to put down riots between the Catholics and Orangemen; within a five-year period in the 1870s the militia had to be called to end riots in Charlottetown, Saint John, Montreal and Toronto, all of which involved the Orangemen vs. Roman Catholics. Both Conservative and Liberal governments used the officer corps of the militia for patronage, leading to a grotesquely bloated officer corps full of men who given commissions for political reasons. The Canadian historian Desmond Morton described the militia officers in Quebec as being almost all "political hacks". At any given moment, between a quarter to sixth of the MPs held officer's commissions in the militia, and who used their commissions to reward supporters in their ridings. In 19th century Canada, an officer's commission in the militia was a keenly sought badge of respectability. Most militiamen served only for 12 days every year, and reports by British officers seconded to the Canadian militia in the late 19th century are full of scathing commentary about an ill-trained militia being commanded by political officers. Between 1875 and 1896, about 20,000 men served in the militia, with the annual 12 days of service every June being seen as one of the major social events of the year.

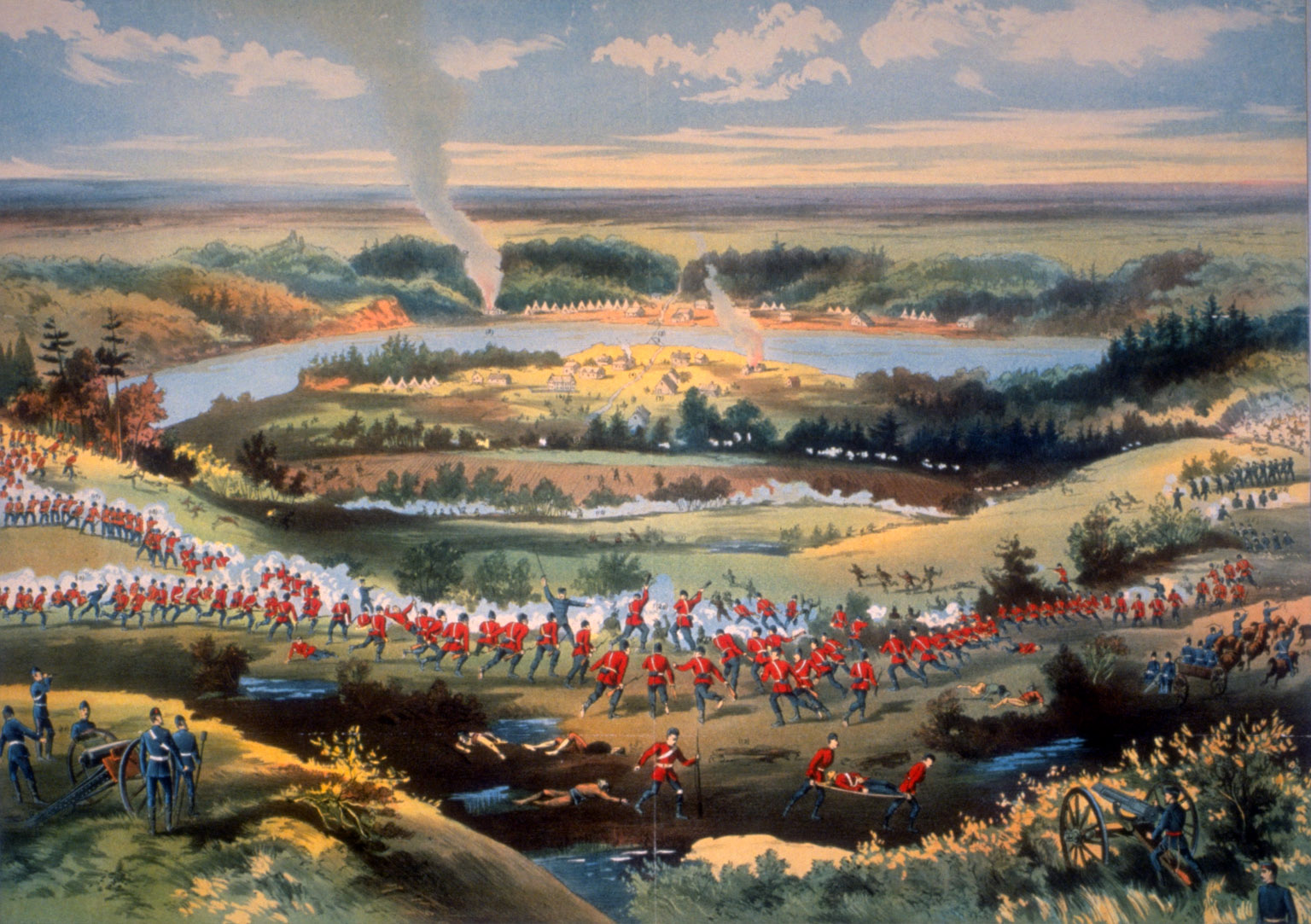
Made up of Permanent and Non-Permanent Active Militia members, the North-West Field Force was sent by the Canadian government to quell the North-West Rebellion.

The North-West Field Force was a body of militia and regular troops created for quelling the North-West Rebellion of 1885, which constituted Canada's first military action without British troop support, although British officers such as Frederick Middleton were in command of the Canadian forces. Middeleton's successor as the commander of the militia, Colonel Ivor Herbert, proved to be a reformer who first revealed to the Canadian press that the ratio of officers in the militia to the privates was 1:2.24 in 1894. Herbert also created the post of quartermaster general to tend to the supply notes and appointed another British officer, Percy Lake as the quartermaster general. Herbert increased spending on the Permanent Force, and founded two new regiments, the Royal Canadian Regiment of Infantry, the Royal Canadian Dragoons and several artillery battalions. Herbert's reforms threatened the entrenched vested interests of the militia and after much lobbying by militia colonels cum MPs, Herbert was dismissed in 1894. Canada sent its first overseas contingent to serve in the Nile Expedition in 1885. The Nile Voyageurs were volunteers from Canada who served as boatmen assisting the regular British forces in the Sudan.

In 1896, the new Liberal Prime Minister Sir Wilfrid Laurier appointed Sir Frederick Borden as defence minister, who stayed on until the Liberals lost the 1911 election. Borden was a reformer, who appointed Colonel Edward Hutton of the British Army as the militia commander. During this period, the Permanent Force acquired an engineer corps, medical corps, transport corps, signalling corps, intelligence corps and an ordnance corps.

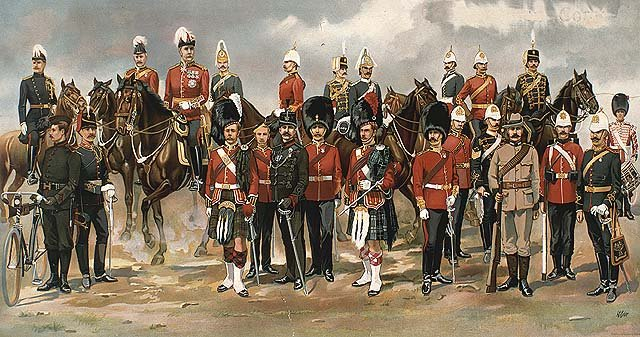
Various uniforms used by the Canadian militia, c. 1898.

In 1899, when war threatened between the Transvaal and Britain, many in English Canada expected Canada to fight alongside the "mother country" while in French Canada were equally opposed. Colonel Sam Hughes, a millionaire Conservative MP and militia officer offered at his own expense to raise a regiment to fight in South Africa, an offer that appalled Hutton, who realized Hughes's proposal offered Laurier an excuse not to send a Canadian force to South Africa and attempted to silence Hughes, who would not be silenced. Within the cabinet Richard Scott and Israel Tarte were opposed to Canada fighting in South Africa while Henri Bourassa, a Liberal back-bencher had emerged as the leading voice in the House of Commons opposed to an expedition to South Africa. On 3 October, Laurier received a Colonial Office circular thanking his government for its "offer" of 250 men to South Africa, an offer that he not made while at the same time the October 1899 edition of Canadian Military Gazette published the details of a plan to mobilize 1,200 men for South Africa. Caught on the spot, Laurier received a note on 9 October from the editor of the Liberal Toronto Globe saying he "must either send troops or get out of office" as the majority of voters in Ontario wanted Canada to fight in South Africa. Caught between the conflicting pressures in English Canada and French Canada, Laurier announced on 14 October that Canada would raise and equip an all-volunteer force to South Africa that once it arrived would operate under British command and be paid for by Britain. Laurier did not summon Parliament for a vote as he knew that the Liberal caucus would split between the English-Canadian MPs and French-Canadian MPs, and instead his decision was announced as an order-in-council. On 30 October, a hastily raised force of 1, 061 volunteers left Quebec City abroad the SS Sardinian (called "the Sardine" by its passengers for cramped conditions) for Cape Town under the command of Colonel William Otter. At their first battle, the Battle of Paardeberg the Canadians performed well, and on 27 February 1900 a battalion from the Maritimes end up holding their own ground after a confusing night battle, which just happened to be the moment that the Transvaal General Piet Cronjé chose to surrender, leading to the British and Canadian press to credit the victory to the Canadians, which gave a tremendous boost to Canadian self-confidence. In the warm glow of victory, Laurier agreed to send another 1,320 volunteers to South Africa while the millionaire Lord Strathcona raised a regiment at his own expense in western Canada, recruiting cowboys to form Strathcona's Horse regiment for South Africa.

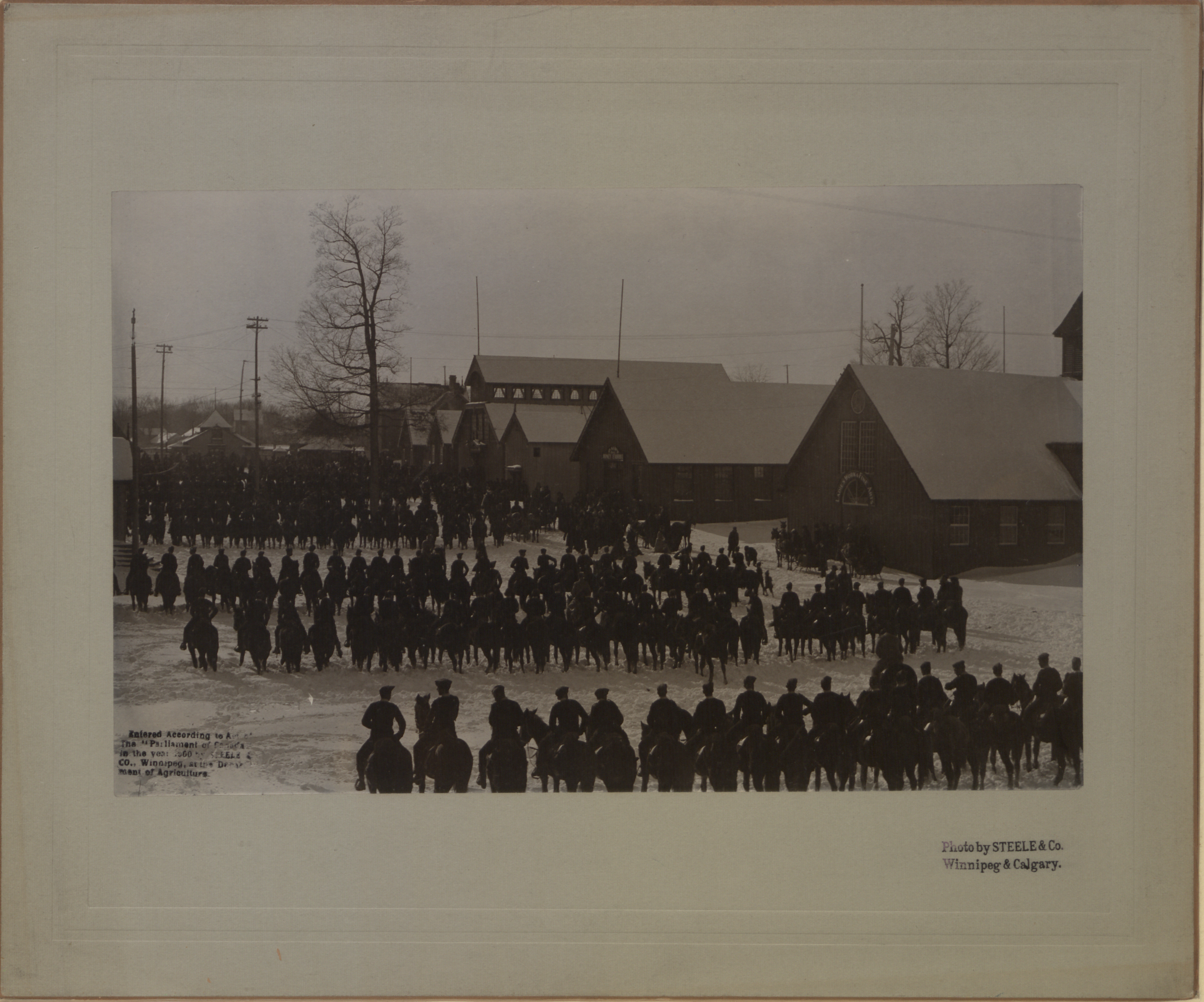
First mounted review of Strathcona's Horse in Ottawa, 1900.

Newspaper coverage of the Boer War presented the conflict as a series of Canadian victories while less flattering news such as defective equipment and uniforms were not mentioned. British Army officers often complained that many of the Canadian officers were inexperienced, incompetent or politically well connected with the worse offender being Colonel Hughes who regarded himself as above taking orders from anybody. Lord Dundonald, the British Army officer who commanded the militia after the Boer War suggested the idea of a "skeleton army" of well trained militia officers who would form the nucleus if the militia were mobilized for war again. Dundonald's ideas were generally adopted, but Dundonald's attempts to involve himself in Canadian politics led to his dismissal on 10 June 1904 as the government announced it was intolerable that a serving officer should be speaking on political issues.

In 1904, a new Militia Act was passed to reform the militia by making Canadian officers the equal of British officers and removing the governor-general from exercising command. Laurier had neither forgotten nor forgiven Lord Minto, the Governor-General, for his role in pressuring him to send a force to South Africa in 1899. In 1904, Colonel Otter became the first Canadian chief of staff for the militia through a British officer, Colonel Percy Lake, was appointed inspector general of the militia. To remedy one of the great defects that had been revealed by the Boer War, Eugène Fiset, a Boer War veteran turned deputy minister of the militia, insisted on improving the medical corps of the militia, saying he had seen too many men die in South Africa because of poor hygiene. On 1 July 1905, the last British garrisons were pulled out of Canada and the responsibility for defending the naval bases at Halifax and Esquimalt was assigned to the militia. The fact the Royal Military College in Kingston only offered instruction in English and English was the sole language of command ensured that French-Canadians were under-represented in the officer corps as English was generally not taught in Quebec's Catholic schools.

Sir Samuel Hughes, who became the minister of defence and militia in 1911 after the Conservatives won the general election that year, become the dominating force in Canadian defence policy. Hughes was described by the Canadian historian René Chartrand as a man of tremendous energy, charisma and a forceful personality who was also a megalomaniac with a grotesquely inflated sense of his own importance and a "stubborn, pompous racist" who did little to disguise his anti-Catholic and anti-French views. As the Prime Minister, Sir Robert Borden, was afraid of Hughes, the militia minister played an oversized role in defence decision-making. In 1912, Hughes forbade militia regiments from marching in Catholic processions as they traditionally done in Quebec since 1867, a move that caused much controversy at the time. Through Hughes justified his move under grounds as upholding secularism, Quebec newspapers blamed it on the prejudices of the Orangemen that the militia minister surrounded himself with.

Hughes was able to raise the level of military spending from $7 million in 1911 to $11 million in 1914, but little of the money went to the Permanent Force, which Hughes was openly hostile to, praising the militia as embodiment of the authentic fighting spirit of Canada. Some of the ways in which Hughes allocated the increased military budget such as giving a free Ford Model T car to every militia colonel in Canada and going on an all expenses junket to Europe in 1913 to observe military maneuvers caused much controversy. Hughes wanted to make militia service compulsory, which he justified under moral, not military grounds, saying in a 1913 speech that he wanted "To make the youth of Canada self-controlled, erect, decent and patriotic through military and physical training, instead of growing up as under present conditions of no control, into young ruffians or young gadabouts...to make the military camps and drill throughout Canada clean, wholesome, sober and attractive to boys and young men; to give that final tough to imperial unity, and crown the arch of responsible government by an inter-Imperial Parliament dealing only with Imperial affairs". A strong believer in temperance, Hughes also saw militia service as a way of promoting his "dry" views, believing he stamp out the evils of alcoholism in Canada by having every man serve in the militia.

Based on his own experiences of the Boer War, Hughes believed that Canadian soldiers were much better soldiers than the British, and it was because of Hughes that the Canadians fought together as a separate expeditionary force during the First World War. The staff officers had developed a plan for mobilizing the militia in the event of the war, which Hughes disregarded in August 1914 by creating an entirely new organization called the Canadian Expeditionary Force, which was to consist of numbered battalions that had no connection with the militia regiments. Reflecting his own beliefs about the superiority of Canadians over the British as soldiers, Hughes fought hard to ensure that the divisions of the Canadian Expeditionary Force be commanded by Canadian generals, and very reluctantly accepted a British officer, Lieutenant-General Edwin Alderson, as the commander of the 1st Canadian Division and only then because of the lack of a qualified Canadian officer. Alderson found Hughes a difficult man to deal with as the defence minister insisted on involving himself in matters that were normally the concern of a defence minister and because the Canadian nationalist Hughes insisted on equipping the Canadian Expeditionary Force with Canadian-made equipment as much as possible, regardless of whether it was practical or not.

== Expansion and the World Wars (1901–1945) ==
After Canadian participation in the Second Boer War, the need for domestic supporting organizations was made evident. Canada in short order formed its own Engineer Corps, Permanent Active Militia Army Medical Corps, Canadian Army Veterinary Corps, Signalling Corps, Ordnance Stores Corps and Canadian Army Service Corps. During the First World War a Canadian Provost Corps was also created. Canada was the first military in the world to create a Canadian Army Dental Corps.

=== First World War ===
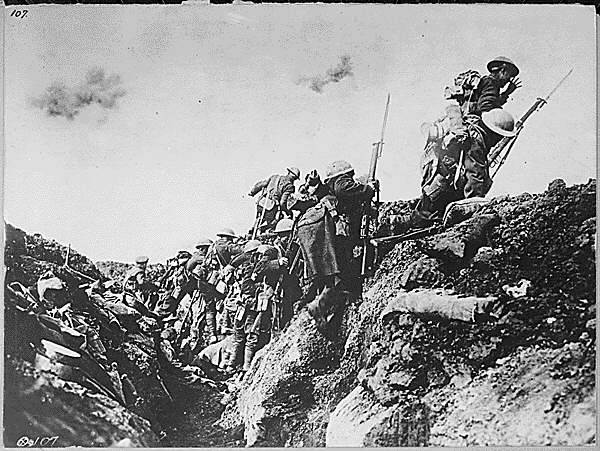
Canadian troops going "over the top" during training near St. Pol, France. October 1916.

Canadian participation in the First World War began with the unusual step of scrapping all mobilization plans, and creating a field force from scratch.

In 1914, the Canadian Expeditionary Force (CEF) was created in response to a call by the United Kingdom for soldiers. The CEF was a separate entity from the Permanent Active Militia (by now also known as the Permanent Force, or PF) and the Non-Permanent Active Militia or NPAM. Regiments and other units of the Militia were not mobilized, but rather transferred personnel to the CEF for overseas employment. The CEF was disbanded after the war.

Major battles and campaigns involving the Canadian Expeditionary Force
Battle	Dates	Formations/units in battle
Second Battle of Ypres	22 April–3 May 1915	Canadian Division
Frezenberg Ridge	8–13 May 1915	Princess Patricia's Canadian Light Infantry (attached to British Expeditionary Force)
Festubert	17–25 May 1915	Canadian Division and Canadian Cavalry Brigade
Second Action at Givenchy	15–16 June 1915	Canadian Division
The St. Eloi Craters	27 March–16 April 1916	2nd and 3rd Canadian Divisions
Mount Sorrel	2–13 June 1916	Canadian Corps
The Somme, 1916	1 July–18 November 1916	Canadian Corps
Vimy Ridge	9–14 April 1917	Canadian Corps
Arleux	28–29 April 1917	Canadian Corps
Third Battle of the Scarpe	3–4 May 1917	Canadian Corps
Hill 70	15–25 August 1917	Canadian Corps
Third Battle of Ypres	31 July–10 November 1917	Canadian Corps
Cambrai, 1917	20 November–3 December 1917	Canadian Corps
The Somme, 1918	21 March–4 April 1918	Canadian Corps
The Lys	9–19 April 1918	Canadian Corps
Amiens	8–11 August 1918	Canadian Corps
Second Battles of Arras, 1918	26 August–3 September 1918	Canadian Corps
Canal du Nord	27 September–1 October 1918	Canadian Corps
St. Quentin Canal	29 September–2 October 1918	Canadian Corps
Beaurevoir Line	3–5 October 1918	Canadian Corps
Cambrai, 1918	30 September–11 October 1918	Canadian Corps
Valciennes	1–2 November 1918	Canadian Corps
The Sambre	4 November 1918	Canadian Corps
Pursuit to Mons, Canada's Hundred Days	2–11 November 1918	Canadian Corps

=== Interwar period modernization ===
The Otter Committee reorganized the Canadian Militia in 1920, instituting a series of perpetuations so that both the pre-war Militia and the CEF had their traditions and histories integrated into the modern Canadian forces. The numbered pre-war regiments were all reorganized and redesignated; the archaic system of numbered regiments in the cavalry and infantry was dropped, with several exceptions such as 1st Hussars, the Royal 22^{e} Régiment (originally the 22nd (Canadien-Français) Battalion, CEF), and the 48th Highlanders of Canada (48th Battalion (Highlanders)).

In 1936, the Non-Permanent Active Militia had six tank battalions created as part of the infantry, the first step towards modernization. Canada's land forces underwent two major organizational changes between the world wars; in 1920 the pre-war regiments were all renamed, several organizational corps were created mirroring corps in the British Army, and new ones like the Canadian Machine Gun Corps or CMGC (not to be confused with the wartime corps of the same name) were created. The new regiments all perpetuated the history of the wartime CEF, and when battle honours were granted many years later, were permitted to adopt those battle honours.

In 1936, the CMGC was abolished and the Militia again underwent dramatic reorganizations, with three types of infantry regiments being created (rifle, machine gun, and tank). Many regiments were disbanded or amalgamated.

=== Second World War ===
The Second World War saw major changes to the Canadian Militia. Acting on the suggestion of General Harry Crerar, the Militia were renamed as the Canadian Army through an Order in Council on 19 November 1940. PAM was reorganized as Canadian Army (Active), whereas NPAM became Canadian Army (Reserve). Many infantry regiments were transferred to the Canadian Armoured Corps, created the same year. Cavalry regiments were mechanized, the horse was withdrawn from military use, and the Royal Canadian Army Veterinary Corps was disbanded.

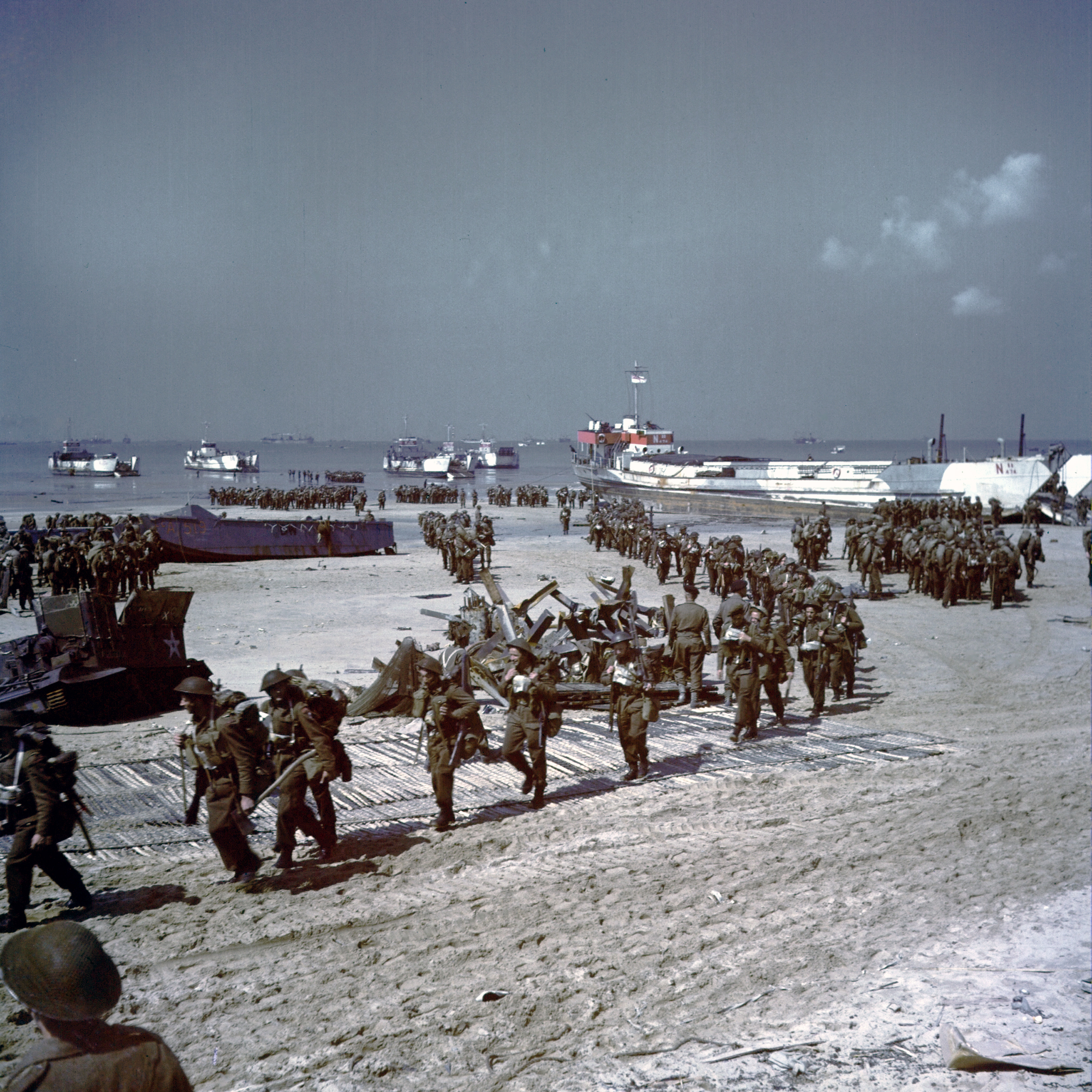
Canadian reinforcements arrive on Juno Beach during the Normandy landings in 1944. The taking of Juno Beach was primarily the responsibility of the Canadian Army.

In 1939, the Canadian Active Service Force (CASF) was mobilized; similar to the CEF, this was a mobilization of prewar PF and NPAM units, who retained their traditional titles. In 1940, the land forces of Canada were retitled. The CASF became the Canadian Army (Overseas), the Permanent Force became the Canadian Army (Active) and the NPAM became the Canadian Army (Reserve). The Canadian Army (Overseas) ceased to exist after the Second World War. A new Canadian Armoured Corps was created and many infantry regiments were reroled to fight in tanks. At home, the Atlantic Command and Pacific Command were created to direct home defence efforts.

A desire to have an entire French-Canadian Brigade was thwarted by a lack of francophone staff officers. The original mobilization scheme grouped infantry battalions by region; the 1st Brigade was an Ontario brigade, the 2nd from Western Canada and the 3rd from the Maritimes. The 2nd Division was supposed to follow the same lines, but after deployments to Iceland, the Western Canadian and Quebec brigades were mixed and no attempt was made with the 3rd, 4th or 5th Divisions to organize regionally. The 5th Brigade was originally to be an all-Quebec brigade, with one anglophone and two francophone regiments. While French Canada was represented by four overseas French-speaking infantry battalions, and the Canadian Army did attempt to produce training literature in French, it would not be until after Unification that French and English soldiers would have equal career opportunities.

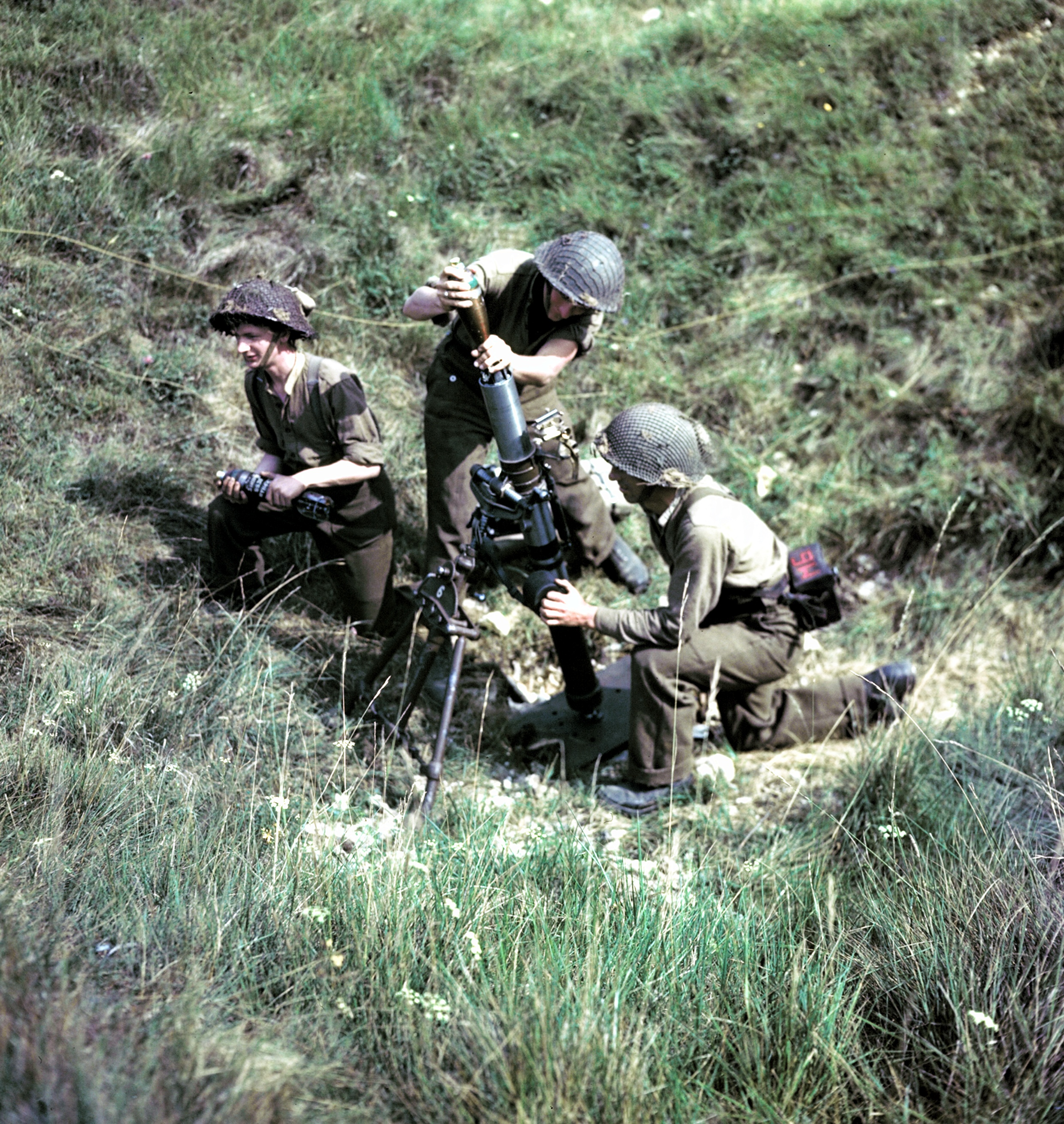
Canadian mortar team in action in France, c. 1944.

The 6th, 7th and 8th Divisions were home defence divisions and contained a large number of troops conscripted under the National Resources Mobilization Act (NRMA) which by law could not serve "overseas". One brigade did go to the Aleutians in 1943 to fight the Japanese on the technicality that it was North American soil, though no contact with the enemy was made. In November 1944, on hearing that the government had decided to send conscripts overseas, a number of soldiers based in Terrace, British Columbia, mutinied. The Terrace Mutiny was the largest insurrection in Canadian military history.

The use of irregular forces became common in western Canada during the Second World War, with the Pacific Coast Militia Rangers being formed in 1942; disbanded after 1945, they were the inspiration for the Canadian Rangers.

==== Veterans Guard of Canada ====
As with the British Home Guard, the Veterans Guard of Canada was initially formed in the early days of the Second World War as a defence force in case of an attack on Canadian soil. Composed largely of First World War veterans it included, at its peak, 37 Active and Reserve companies with 451 officers and 9,806 other ranks. Over 17,000 veterans served in the force over the course of the war. Active companies served full-time in Canada as well as overseas, including a General Duty Company attached to Canadian Military Headquarters in London, England, No. 33 Coy. in the Bahamas, No. 34 Coy. in British Guiana and Newfoundland, and a smaller group dispatched to India. The Veterans Guard were involved in a three-day prisoner of war uprising in 1942, known as the Battle of Bowmanville. Along with its home defence role, the Veterans Guard assumed responsibility for guarding internment camps from the Canadian Provost Corps, which helped release younger Canadians for service overseas. The Guards were disbanded in 1947.

Major battles and campaigns involving the Canadian Army
Battle/campaign	Dates	Formations/units in battle
Hong Kong	7–26 December 1941	Winnipeg Grenadiers and Royal Rifles of Canada
Raid on Dieppe	19 August 42	2nd Canadian Infantry Division
Sicily	10 July–6 August 1943	I Canadian Corps
Advance from Reggio di Calabria to Campobasso	3 September–14 Oct 1943	I Canadian Corps
Battles of the Winter Line (Sangro, The Gully and Ortona)	December 1943–April 1944	I Canadian Corps
Liri Valley	May–June 1944	I Canadian Corps
Gothic Line	July 1944	I Canadian Corps
Advance through the Lombard Plain	August 1944–February 1945	I Canadian Corps
Normandy	6 June–July 1944	First Canadian Army and the 1st Canadian Parachute Battalion (latter was attached to the British 6th Airborne Division)
Falaise Gap		First Canadian Army
Clearing the Channel Coast	September 1944	First Canadian Army
The Scheldt	September 1944–February 1945	First Canadian Army
Rhineland	February–March 1945	First Canadian Army
Securing the Netherlands	March–May 1945	First Canadian Army

== Early Cold War (1946–1968) ==
The Canadian Army underwent many changes after the Second World War, including redesignations. The full-time component became the Canadian Army Active Force and the part-time component the Canadian Army Reserve Force.

Before 1930 the Canadian Army was a small cadre of professional soldiers augmented by civilian volunteers and, in the Second World War, conscripts. It was basically a colonial institution that closely followed the traditions, doctrine and training routines of the British Army. After 1945, Canada began breaking loose from Britain in many regards, including the military. At issue was professionalization. The modernizing faction of the Army called for a very well-educated officer corps that was capable of interacting with political and diplomatic elites in Ottawa, and giving the military its own voice in national decisions. However, the traditionalist element emphasized the wisdom and preserving regimental traditions, and said leadership should be based on middle and upper-class status. Invariably, this meant senior officers of British descent, as opposed to French or Irish or other ethnic backgrounds. The tension between modernizers and traditionalists lead to stalemate, and a failure to develop modern management. The modernizers pointed to the failure of professional norms in the 1993 Somalia peacekeeping fiasco. In recent decades, the reformers have developed a "constabulary-realist" model of professionalism.

=== Korean War ===
In the summer of 1950, when Canada was asked to contribute troops to the United Nations forces fighting in Korea, the government in Ottawa was forced to admit that the Mobile Strike Force was seriously under-strength, and that to send the Mobile Strike Force to South Korea would leave Canada undefended. Rather than engage in the politically difficult move of conscription, the Defence Minister, Brooke Claxton promised that Canada would raise an all-volunteer Army Special Force for Korea. By fall of 1950, 10, 587 men had volunteered to fight in Korea. Canada sent 26,791 Canadians to serve in the Korean War, with 7,000 more remaining to supervise the ceasefire until the end of 1955. Of these 1,558 became casualties, including 516 deaths, most due to combat. Canada's participation included several naval vessels and aircraft, in addition to the 25th Canadian Infantry Brigade which served as part of the 1st Commonwealth Division. In late 1950, Princess Patricia's Regiment left for South Korea and in February 1951 entered the line as part of an Anglo-Australian brigade. Princess Patricia's regiment was engaged in heavy fighting during the Battle of Kapyong on 22–25 April 1951 when a Chinese assault caused a South Korean division to collapse in the Kapyong valley; Princess Patricia's regiment was sent with British, Australian and New Zealand units in to hold the line. At one point during the night of April 22–23, 1951, Princess Patricia's had to call down artillery fire on their own positions to stop the advancing Chinese. The successful defence of the Kapyong valley earned the "Princess Pats" a presidential citation from President Truman, the first time that a Canadian unit had been so honored. The rest of 25th Infantry Brigade arrived in South Korea on 25 May 1951, and joined the Commonwealth Division in the summer. The 25th Brigade fitted in well with the British, Australian and New Zealand soldiers of the Commonwealth Division fighting for the Crown on the war-scarred hills of Korea.

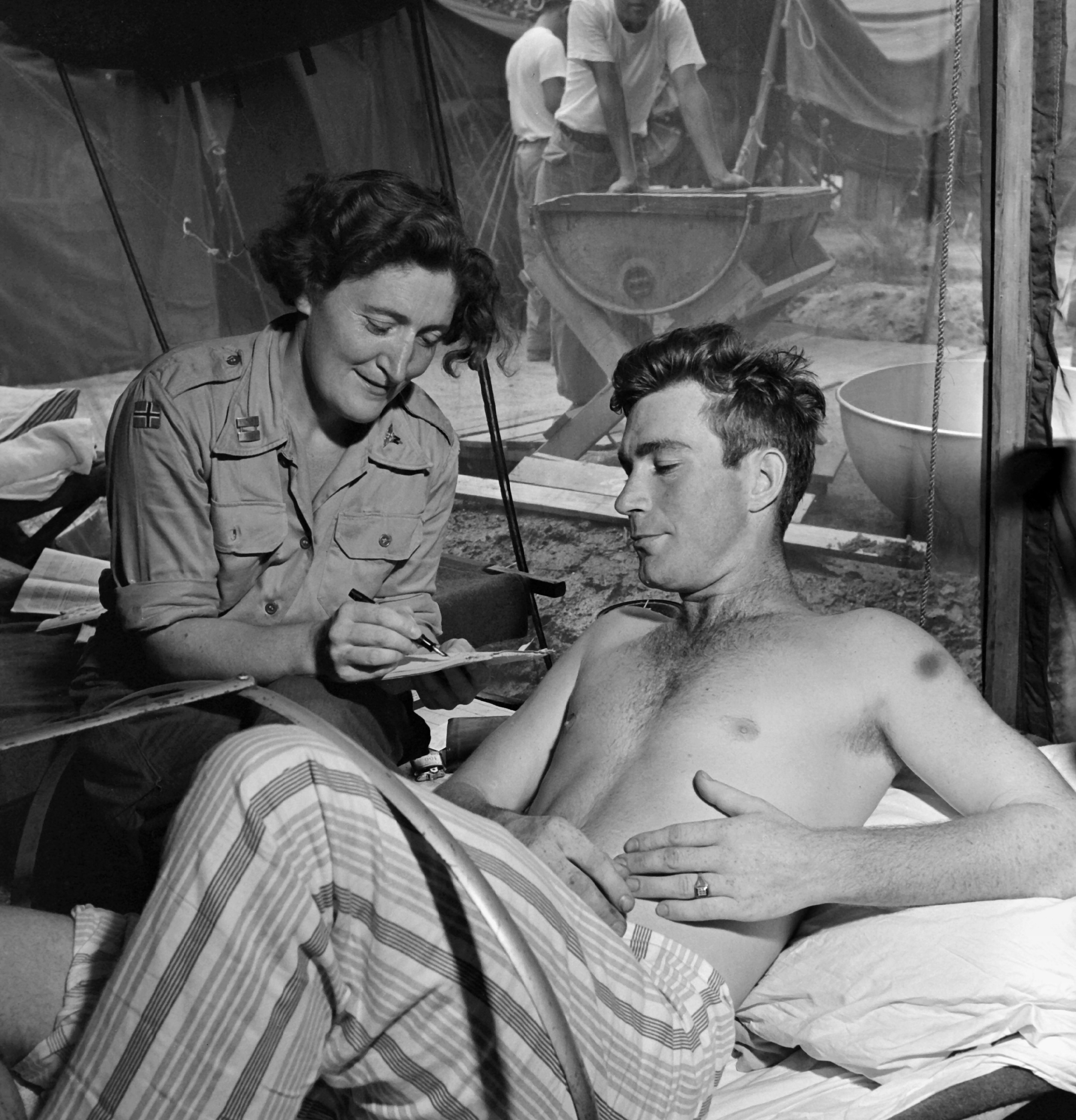
Norwegian Captain Petra Drabloe is shown with a patient, Lance Corporal M. R. Stevens of the Canadian Army during the Korean War.

Canada's military was revitalized as a result of the Korean War. A planned changeover to US-designed weapons equipment had been planned for the 1950s, but the emergency in Korea forced the use of war stocks of Second World War–vintage British-designed weapons. On 5 February 1951, at a time when the Chinese were advancing in Korea, the Defence Minister, Brooke Claxton, announced in the House of Commons an emergency military budget of $5 billion which committed the government to raise an infantry division within the next three years and committed a brigade to Europe at once. At the time, it was believed that Stalin had ordered the North Korean invasion of South Korea in June 1950 as a part of a diversion to tie down Western forces in Korea as a prelude to a Soviet invasion of West Germany. Consequently, Canada followed the United States in increasing forces for the defence of West Germany instead of South Korea during the Korean War. On 16 January 1951, General Dwight Eisenhower, the NATO Supreme Allied Commander, visited Ottawa to tell the Prime Minister Louis St. Laurent and his cabinet that he believed there was a possibility the Red Army would invade West Germany in the near-future and help from Canada was needed at once.

Ultimately, Canada promised two divisions to the defence of West Germany. A major dispute arose between General Charles Foulkes, Chairman of the Chiefs of Staff Committee, and General Guy Simonds, chief of the army staff, over whatever the Canadian contingent would serve under U.S or British command. Foulkes had served under Simonds in World War Two, and the two generals were well known for their acrimonious relations as Simonds always took the view that Foulkes was incompetent. Simonds successfully argued that for historical reasons and because of doubts about the combat efficiency of the U.S Army that the Canadians should serve as part of the British Army of the Rhine in northern Germany. The way in which the North Koreans had driven the Americans back to the Pusan perimeter in the summer of 1950 followed by the Chinese victory along the Yalu in November 1950 had "shocked" Canadian decision-makers and created major doubts about the quality of the U.S. Army. In the late 1950s, Canada adopted a variety of weapons of European, British and US design rather than proceeding with its planned Americanization.

=== Post-Korea ===
Aside from providing a field force for the Korean War, few operational missions existed until the rise of peacekeeping in the 1960s.

Prior to the coronation of Queen Elizabeth II, the Canadian Army was the only Imperial/Commonwealth nation to have provided the King's Guard in London. In the lead up, the contingent of Canadian troops sent for the coronation provided the guard during June 1953, along with an equivalent unit of the Australian Army.

During the early 1950s the Army advertised in British newspapers for British ex-servicemen to join the Canadian Army. These recruits were transported to Canada for training. After a 6-month trial period the soldiers' families were allowed to emigrate to join the father. Transport was usually by scheduled sea transport. In 1954, the report of the Kennedy Board was tabled, giving suggestions for reorganizing the Militia. The Anderson Report followed in late 1957.

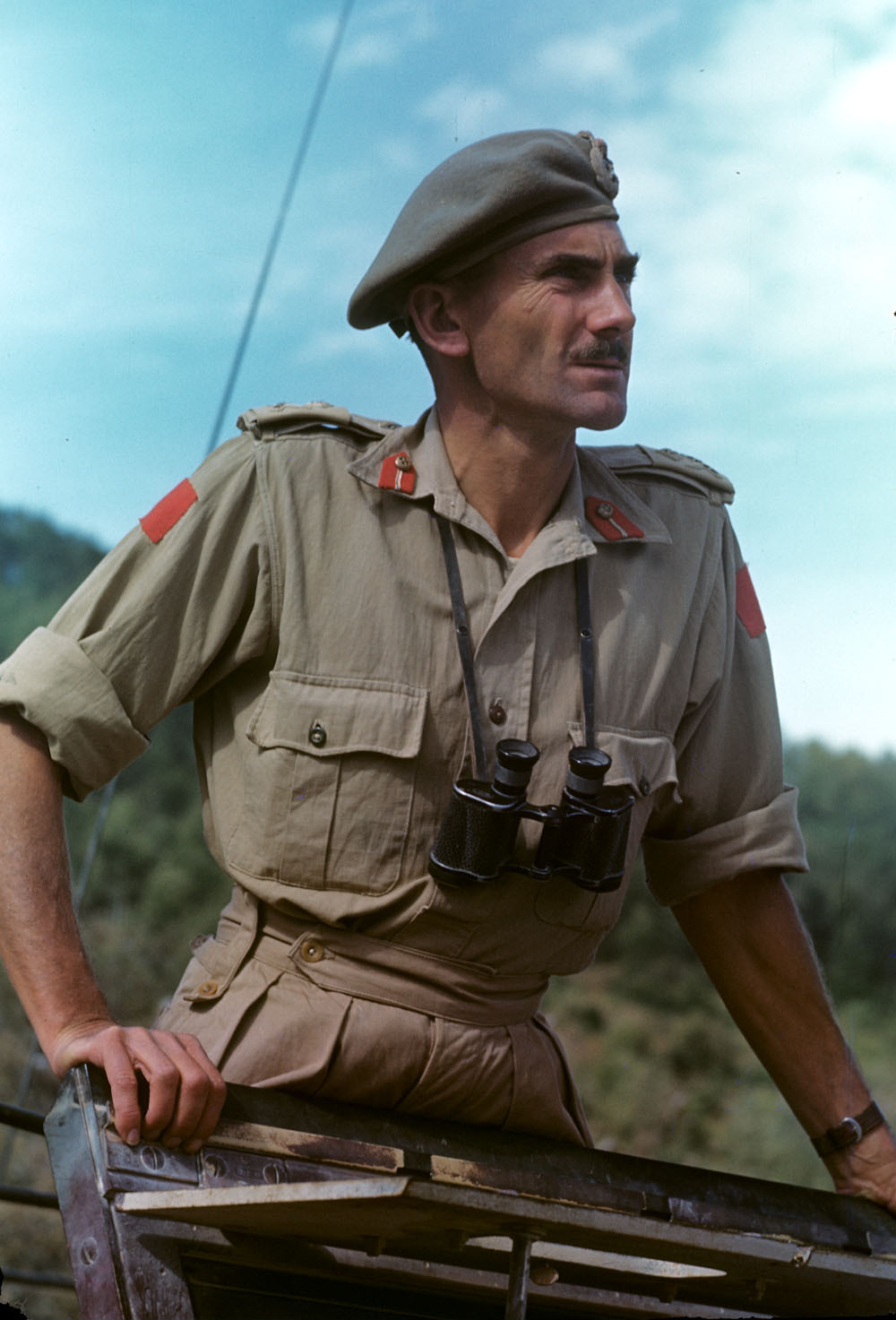
LGen. Guy Simonds, was Canada's Chief of Army Staff from 1951 to 1955. Simond's vision during his tenure resulted in Canada fielding its largest ever standing army by the late-1950s.

The late 1950s saw a dramatic increase in the Army's size and Canada's largest ever standing army was created, largely through the vision of General G. G. Simonds, the Chief of the General Staff. The reason for this expansion was the need to maintain a presence in Germany as part of NATO, while simultaneously providing forces for the Korean War. Simonds stated that the shipping to transport large armies to Europe was not available, any Canadian soldiers wanting to fight in World War Three in Europe should it begin best be there when the war began. From 1950 to 1953, the Canadian military ballooned from having 47,000 personnel to 104,000 personnel by 1953. Despite the increasing size, General Guy Simonds complained that the Army was not attracting enough men with the necessary specialized skills and spoke of peacetime conscription, only to be silenced by the Defence minister Brooke Claxton, who warned him that with public opinion polls showing that 83% of Québécois opposed to conscription, that this was too politically risky. Initially, six new regular infantry battalions were raised by regiments of the Militia – two were raised from ordinary line infantry regiments, two from regiments of rifles and two from regiments of Highlanders. When the decision was made to make this arrangement permanent, it was decided that the battalions would become regular battalions of regiments. The decision was taken to make the rifles and highland battalions part of two of the senior existing militia regiments, while the infantry battalions were organised into a new national regiment:

- 1st and 2nd Canadian Infantry Battalions – 3rd and 4th Battalions, Canadian Guards (Raised by the Carleton and York Regiment, the Algonquin Regiment, the Loyal Edmonton Regiment, les Fusiliers Mont-Royal and the Hastings and Prince Edward Regiment.)
- 1st and 2nd Canadian Rifle Battalions – 1st and 2nd Battalions, The Queen's Own Rifles of Canada (Raised by the Queen's Own Rifles of Canada, the Victoria Rifles of Canada, the Royal Winnipeg Rifles, the Regina Rifle Regiment and the Royal Hamilton Light Infantry (Wentworth Regiment).)
- 1st and 2nd Canadian Highland Battalions – 1st and 2nd Battalions, The Black Watch (Royal Highland Regiment) of Canada (Raised by the Black Watch (Royal Highland Regiment) of Canada, the North Nova Scotia Highlanders, 48th Highlanders of Canada, The Seaforth Highlanders of Canada and the Canadian Scottish Regiment (Princess Mary's).)

Simonds was a great believer in esprit de corps as a way of motivating soldiers to fight, and he quite consciously sought to build on the history and traditions of the Canadian Army to provide men serving in the Army with a reason to feel pride in their regiments, and hence a willingness to fight for their regimental honor. It was for this reason that Simonds had militia regiments like the Black Watch of Montreal, the Queen's Own Rifles of Toronto and the Fort Garry Horse of Winnipeg transferred over to the regular army instead of raising new regiments, and created a Regiment of Canadian Guards who were closely modeled after the Brigade of Guards who protected the royal family in London, right down to the scarlet uniforms and bearskin hats. By 1953, the defence budget was $1, 907 million dollars, ten times the level of 1947, and the end of the Korean War did not mark the end of the high level of military spending as the end of the Boer War and the two world wars had done, making the 1950s–60s the only period why the Canadian government ever spent large sums on defence in peacetime. The 1950s and 1960s are remembered as something of a "golden age" for the military as for once the chronic problems caused by under-funding by Ottawa in peacetime did not exist. Unlike the Royal Canadian Navy and the Royal Canadian Air Force, whose personnel were overwhelmingly English-Canadians and where English was the sole language of command, the Canadian Army was the only service that made some allowance for French-Canadians. In 1952, the Army opened the Collège Militaire Royal de Saint-Jean to train French-Canadian officer candidates in French (previously all officer candidates had been trained in English at the Royal Military College). However, the Canadian Army was still a mostly English-speaking institution in the 1950s with the Royal 22^{e} Régiment and the 8th Hussars being the only regiments in the regular army that were for French-Canadians.

In the early 1950s Canada sent a brigade to West Germany as part of its NATO commitment after the creation of that alliance in 1949. The 27th Canadian Infantry Brigade later became 4 Canadian Mechanized Brigade Group, which remained stationed in West Germany and later the unified Germany until the 1990s and the end of the Cold War.

The future of the Army was put in doubt in the age of nuclear deterrence. The postwar Militia (the part-time component of the Canadian Army) was reroled from combat operations to civil defence. In 1964 the Suttie Commission made suggestions on improving the Army. In 1968, The Canadian Airborne Regiment, a full-time parachute regiment, was created.

=== Unification ===
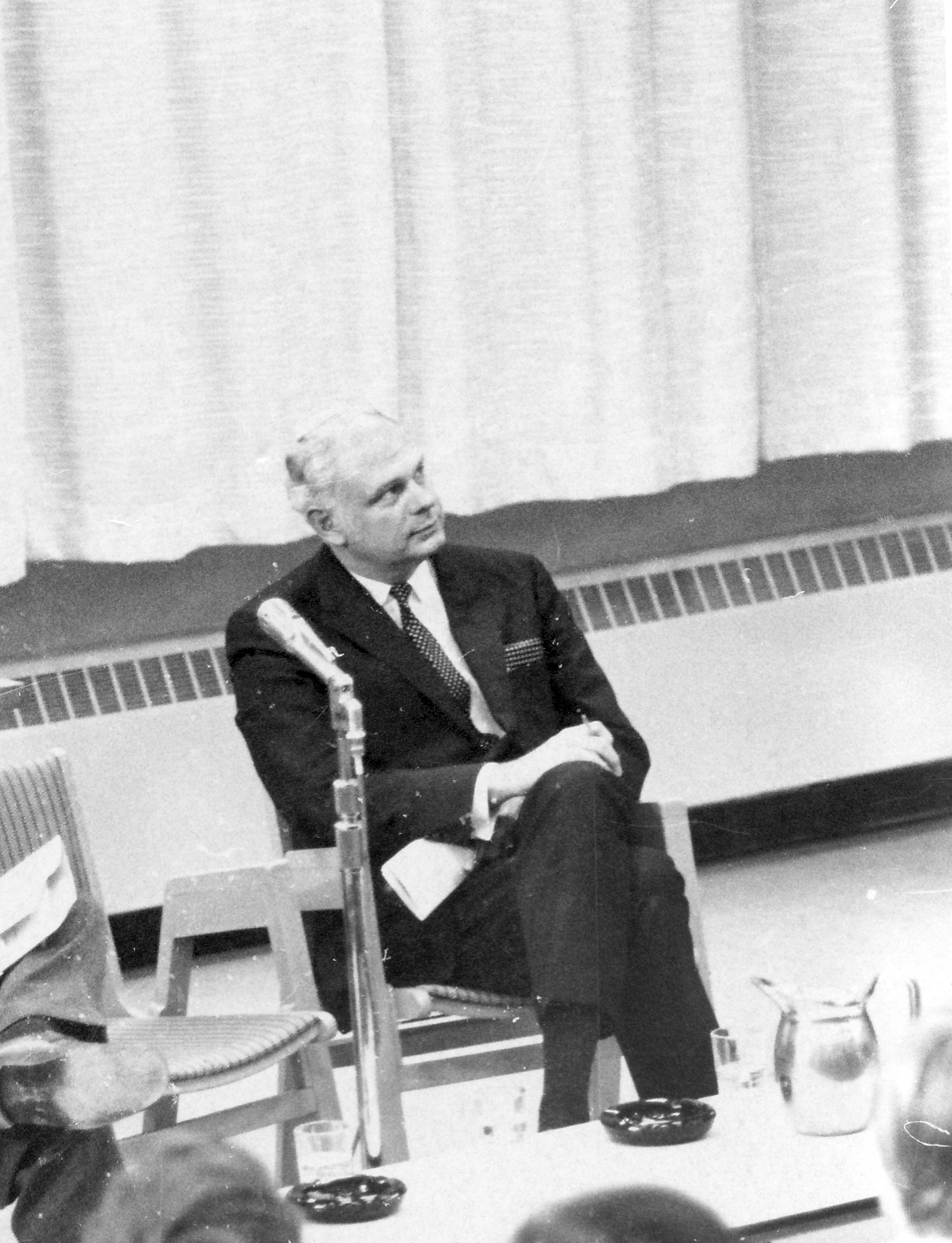
As the Minister of National Defence, Paul Hellyer issued white papers in 1964 that proposed uniting the Air Force, Army, and Navy into a single service.

Paul Hellyer, the Liberal Defence Minister, had issued a white paper in 1964 proposing to unite the Army, the Air Force and the Navy into one service, arguing that the idea of separate services fighting on land, sea and the air were anachronistic in the modern age. Hellyer's plans to unify the military provoked much opposition; an essay by General Simonds called Hellyer's ideas nonsense. Simonds wrote an Air Force pilot alone in his aircraft decided whatever to fight or flee; a junior naval officer holding the equivalent rank as the air force pilot had the decision to fight decided by his captain for him; and a junior Army officer holding the equivalent rank as the naval and air force officers had to decide not only to fight or flee for himself, but to persuade the men under his command to fight as well. General Simonds argued the different environments of war at land, air, and sea required different leadership styles and Hellyer's plans to merge all three services into one threatened to dissolve what was necessary for officers in each service. Hellyer's Chief of the Defence Staff, Air Chief Marshal Frank Robert Miller, resigned in protest against unification, as did two generals who resigned in 1964 and seven admirals in 1966.

After Air Marshal Miller resigned, Hellyer appointed General Jean Victor Allard as Chief of the Defence Staff, who supported unification as a way of promoting the "French fact" in the military. General Allard, who had served with the Royal 22^{e} Régiment in Italy in World War II and in Korea, had a distinguished combat record, but also described by the historian Desmond Morton as a "chronic opportunist" who was forever seeking a way to ingratitude himself with those who held power. Furthermore, the French-Canadian Allard believed the military was too British and felt that unification and "Canadianizing" the military would encourage more French-Canadians to enlist. The resignations of the officers failed to move public opinion with most Canadians being apathetic about Hellyer's plans for unification. Newspaper cartoonists frequently ridiculed the officers who resigned as an absurd Colonel Blimp types who were anachronistically clinging to British traditions and old-fashioned ideas about war in the modern age while Hellyer was depicted as a bold visionary and a technocratic elitist whose plans to merge the three services into one were in tune with the zeitgeist. An ambitious man, Hellyer had championed unification to present himself as an innovative leader as he openly aspired to be prime minister one day, and in general the media took his side against his military critics. In a 1966 editorial, the Winnipeg Free Press stated that Hellyer had "earned the nation's gratitude and its continued support" while in the same year the Vancouver Sun in an editorial declared that "young Mr. Hellyer seems to be quietly pulling off what may in time be recorded as this government's greatest achievement".

In the face of much opposition from the Conservative MPs and with the use of closure, Parliament passed Hellyer's Canadian Forces Reorganization Bill on 25 April 1967. On 1 July 1967 to mark the Centennial of Canadian confederation, a huge Centennial tattoo was held in Ottawa with all three services marching together to celebrate both Centennial and "their vanishing traditions" with many participating noting that this was the end of their services. The Army was integrated with the Royal Canadian Navy and the Royal Canadian Air Force on February 1, 1968, under the policy of Unification. The newly formed Canadian Forces was the first combined military force in the modern world. The Army became known as Mobile Command. Helicopter operations, briefly instituted under Army purview in the early 1960s, transferred to Air Command.

Most of the pre-unification corps that had been created in the early 20th century were disbanded; they were merged with counterparts in the Navy and Air Force to form the personnel branches of the CF. The move toward unification, as well as other budget and cost-cutting moves during the 1980s and 1990s were vehemently opposed by many and is sometimes regarded as a fault in the Canadian Forces. The majority of veterans and those serving at the time objected to this initiative; with many, including senior officers, leaving the military altogether. One of the most controversial aspects of unification was Hellyer's decision to abolish the traditional British style uniforms of the Canadian Army together with those of the Royal Canadian Navy and the Royal Canadian Air Force to impose a common green American style uniform on the entire Canadian Forces. As part of his drive to "Canadianize" the military, Hellyer also abolished the traditional British style ranks and replaced them with American style ranks. On 16 August 2011, the Canadian Government restored the names of the Royal Canadian Navy, Canadian Army and Royal Canadian Air Force to the existing maritime, land and air commands; although the unified command and structure of the CF remains.

- Royal Canadian Army Medical Corps and Royal Canadian Dental Corps—became the Canadian Forces Medical Service and Canadian Forces Dental Service respectively; in 2001, the CFMS and CFDS, which were always closely associated administratively, formed a single operational formation, the Canadian Forces Health Services Group while the separate administrative branches remained intact under a single Director General Health Services.
- Royal Canadian Corps of Signals—became the Communications and Electronics Branch. In 2013 the army component of the branch regained the title Royal Canadian Corps of Signals.
- Royal Canadian Ordnance Corps amalgamated with supply and transport services of Royal Canadian Army Service Corps—became the Logistics Branch. Renamed in 2018 to Royal Canadian Logistics Service
- Royal Canadian Electrical and Mechanical Engineers—became Land Ordnance Engineering, then Electrical and Mechanical Engineering Branch, then back to Corps of Royal Canadian Electrical and Mechanical Engineers in 2013
- Clerical trades of Royal Canadian Army Service Corps, Royal Canadian Army Pay Corps, and Royal Canadian Postal Corps—became the Administration Branch (later merged with the Logistics Branch, and as of 2018 is the Royal Canadian Logistics Service.)
- Canadian Provost Corps and Canadian Intelligence Corps—became the Security Branch. Both elements split apart in 1982 to the Security Branch and Intelligence Branch. In 2017, Army Intelligence Officers and Operators of the Intelligence Branch once more became members of the Canadian Intelligence Corps, which remains a part of the overall Intelligence Branch.

== Post-unification and the late-Cold War (1969–1991) ==
In 1968, the new Liberal Prime Minister, Pierre Trudeau promised a re-evaluation of Canada's defence commitments and for a time in 1968–69 seriously considered pulling out of NATO. Ultimately, Trudeau chose to stay in NATO in order to maintain good relations with the United States and the western European states, all of whom would object if Canada were to leave NATO. On 3 April 1969, Trudeau announced in a speech the new priorities of the Canadian Forces in this order:

- The "surveillance" of Canada to provide protection against external and internal threats as the number one mission.
- Working in co-operation with the United States in the defence of North America as the number two mission.
- The defence of western Europe as per Canada's NATO commitments as the number three mission.
- United Nations peace-keeping missions as the number four mission.

In May 1969, the Defence Minister, Léo Cadieux, visited the capitals of western Europe to tell the leaders of the western European states that Canada would be drastically cutting its NATO commitments later that year, and henceforward, Canada's role in NATO would be only to provide token contributions to the defence of western Europe. On 23 June 1969, Cadieux announced to the House of Commons drastic cuts in defence spending as Canada's commitments to NATO were going to be reduced. In June 1969 in a speech to the graduating class at Queen's University, Trudeau warned that United States was descending into anarchy with race riots and student protests, and the violence in the United States could "easily spill" into Canada, which he claimed required more soldiers in Canada. In September 1969, it was announced that half of the Canadian Forces stationed in West Germany were to be pulled out with the remainder to be moved to Lahr in southern West Germany to operate under American operational command; previously, the Canadian Forces in West Germany had been stationed in northern West Germany under British operational command. The historical links between the British and Canadian armies ended in 1969. The major operation for the Canadian Forces in 1969 was domestic when the Service de police de la Ville de Montréal went on strike on 7 October 1969, leading to rioting in Montreal that required the Army to put down. In 1970 Cadieux's successor as Defence Minister, Donald Macdonald, announced to the House of Commons that the safeguarding Canada's sovereignty and helping with "the social and economic development of Canada" were the main purpose of the Canadian Forces. In a 1970 white paper, Defence in the Seventies, it was announced the "Priority One" of the Canadian Forces was now internal security, with the future enemy now envisioned as the FLQ instead of the Soviet Union.

The Regular Force was downsized in 1970, and the number of regular infantry battalions was reduced from 13 to 10. This was achieved by reducing the Canadian Guards to nil strength, returning both the Queen's Own Rifles of Canada and the Black Watch (Royal Highland Regiment) of Canada to their militia only status and rebadging soldiers into three new battalions of the remaining Regular Regiments. The Regular Force regiment of The Fort Garry Horse and the 4th Regiment Royal Canadian Horse Artillery were reduced to nil strength and placed on the Supplementary Order of battle on 16 June 1970.

In October 1970, during the October Crisis, the army was called out as an aid to civil power with the Royal 22^{e} Régiment being deployed to guard government buildings in Montreal on 15 October 1970. The deployment was not popular with the senior leaders of the Canadian Forces, who feared correctly that Trudeau would use the October Crisis as a reason for his "Priority One" of internal security. In keeping with Trudeau's "Priority One" of internal security as the prime mission of the Canadian Forces, throughout the 1970s the Canadian Forces were described as having "stagnated", with budget cuts reducing both the size of the Canadian Forces and the amount of equipment available for operations. In 1976, as a favour to his close personal friend, West German chancellor Helmut Schmidt, and to improve trade talks with the European Economic Community, the Trudeau government purchased 128 German Leopard tanks for Mobile Command. The Leopard tanks were already outclassed by Red Army T-72s and would have served little purpose in the event of World War Three, but were felt to be useful for "Priority One". Likewise, 400 Swiss-built armoured vehicles were purchased and stationed at various bases and armouries across the country that were meant for the "Priority One" of putting down riots, not war, through their purpose was described only as "peacekeeping". Reflecting the "Priority One" of internal security, by the end of the 1970s the Mobile Command had become an internal security force that was not capable of fighting a major conventional war.

Morton wrote the "drastic 1969 force reduction" caused the combat efficiency of the Canadian Forces to "dwindle" in the 1970s. The frequent rotation of defence ministers with 7 men holding the portfolio between 1971 and 79 meant there were no defence ministers who ever really understood their portfolio, which led to much confusion and a lack of direction from the top. Moreover, the Department of National Defence was considered to be unglamorous portfolio that the more abler ministers in the Trudeau cabinet wanted to avoid, and Morton wrote all of the defence ministers of the 1970s were mediocrities. Trudeau had little time for his generals, and starting in 1972 began a programme of "civilization", bringing civil servants and "management experts" to push aside the senior officers at the Department of National Defence in attempt to "rationalize" military decision-making. Despite the effort at "rationalization", Trudeau's "management experts" caused several expensive debacles with military procurement in the 1970s.

=== Francophone units ===
In 1967, the Royal Commission on Bilingualism and Biculturalism in its report to Ottawa slammed the Canadian military for mostly operating in English and demanded that more be done to open career opportunities for French-Canadians. The Royal Commission criticized the Army for trapping French-Canadians within the Royal 22^{e} Régiment and a few other units based in Quebec, stating that those French-Canadians who wanted to advance into high command had to serve in what Morton called "unfamiliar and sometimes inhospitable surroundings outside Quebec". Because the Army outside of the Royal 22^{e} Régiment was not seen as friendly towards French-Canadians, very few French-Canadians enlisted and French-Canadian personnel in the Army did not reflect their percentage of the total population of Canada. Specifically, the royal commission demanded that more French-Canadian units be established outside of Quebec, that all officers holding high command be fluently bilingual and stated that 28% of recruits should be French-Canadian. All of the royal commission's recommendations were passed into law, and one consequence of the rule that those holding high command should be bilingual was to give French-Canadian officers something of a monopoly on high command for a generation as most French-Canadian officers were fluent in English while most English-Canadian officers were not fluent in French.

In the late 1960s, the Canadian Forces committed itself to creating French Language Units (FLUs) and encouraging career opportunities for Francophones. The Minister of National Defence, Léo Cadieux, announced their creation on April 2, 1968, to include artillery and armoured regiments as well as units of the supporting arms, with two battalions of the Royal 22^{e} Régiment at their core. The Army FLUs eventually concentrated at Valcartier and became known as 5^{e} Groupement de combat. A French-speaking Regular Force armoured regiment, 12^{e} Régiment blindé du Canada, and artillery regiment, 5^{e} Régiment d'artillerie légère du Canada, were created, and the policy of bilingualism was supported by the first Chief of the Defence Staff, General J.V. Allard. To improve bilingualism, a "Francotrain" programme was established to teach English-Canadian officers French and to train French-Canadian recruits in specialist skills. Morton wrote that: "From being a virtual anglophone monopoly, the Canadian armed forces came, for a time, to resemble the country they served: two mutually resentful solitudes. Despite Cadieux's hopeful promise that he would not "divide the force on an unilingual or geographical basis," he had done so". Ultimately, Morton wrote "enforced bilingualism was necessary. It was also a success". By the 1990s, the journalist Jocelyn Coulon in his books and essays called the Canadian Forces one of the most successful examples of a truly bilingual institution in Canada.

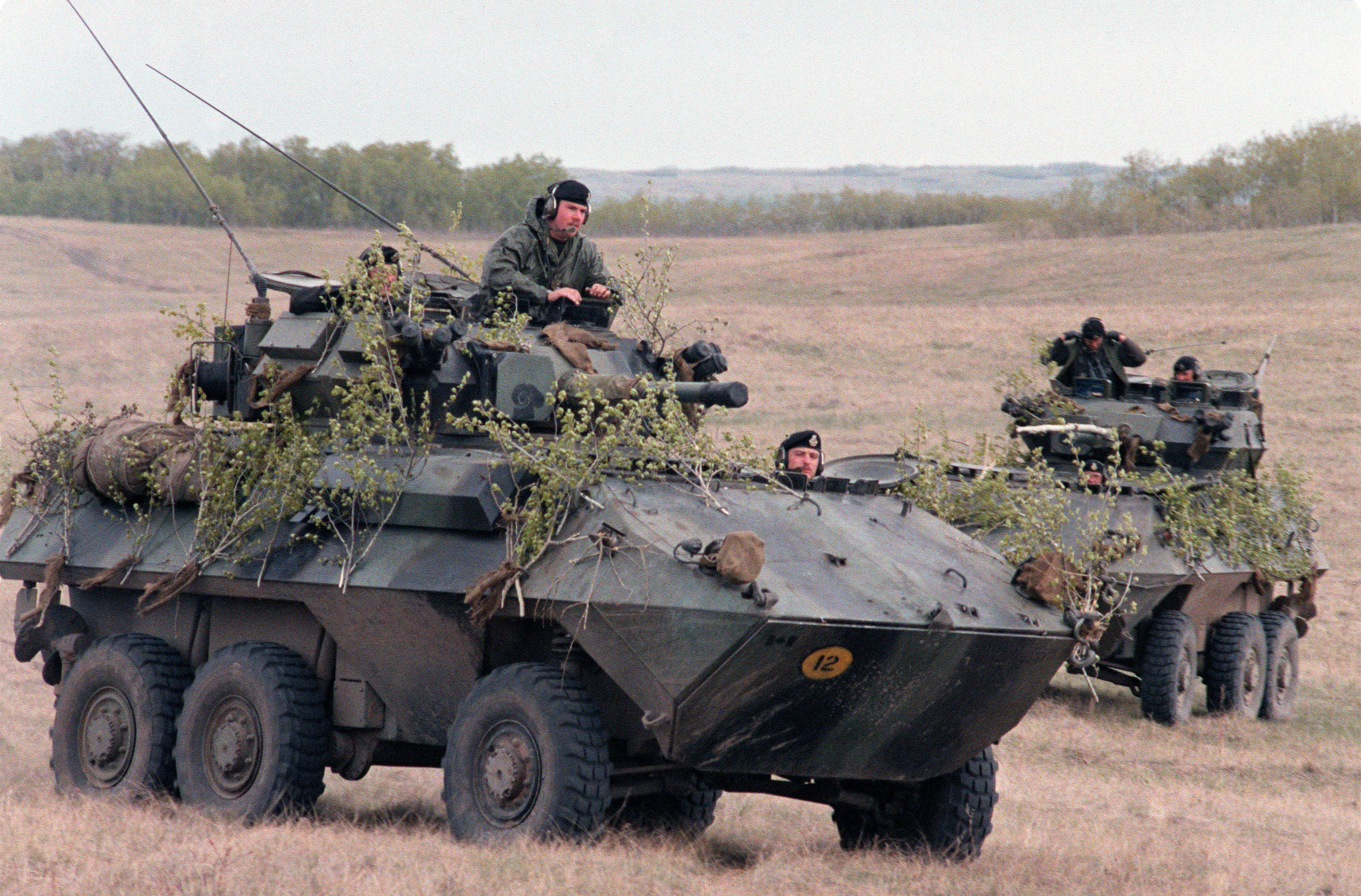
A pair of Canadian Army AVGP Cougars during RENDEZVOUS '83, a NATO exercise in 1983. Acquired in the late-1970s, the AVGP Cougar was primarily used for reconnaissance.

The focus of Mobile Command was set on peace missions as well as future conventional war in Europe. Equipment acquisitions such as the M113 APC and Leopard tank marked a modernization, as did the use of the Cougar and Grizzly AVGP in armoured reconnaissance and mechanized infantry roles.

=== 1980s ===
In 1984, the Progressive Conservatives under Brian Mulroney government won the general election. The Conservative platform promised to undo the neglect of the Trudeau years, but in office the Mulroney government was torn between increasing the military budget; patronage politics which committed the government to rewarding supporters with contracts, which often had no military justification; and a desire to balance the budget. Morton commented that Mulroney continued the Trudeau tradition of frequent rotation of defence ministers together with "handing the defence portfolio to weak or worn out ministers".

In 1985, the Mulroney government restored the different uniforms of the Canadian Forces with the Mobile Command being allowed to wear tan brown uniforms to distinguish them from the Maritime Command and Air Command in a move that was widely welcomed by the rank and file. After Mulroney's first defence minister, Robert Coates, was forced to resign after it was revealed that he spent much of a trip to West Germany visiting strip clubs, he was replaced by Erik Nielsen, a Second World War veteran and a "tough political insider with plenty of experience" who also served as deputy prime minister. Neilson was an articulate advocate for the Canadian Forces within the cabinet and was able to increase the military budget with the Canadian brigade in West Germany that had been under-strength ever since 1969 finally brought up to full strength. In 1985, the United States sent an icebreaker through the Northwest Passage without Canadian permission, which first awakened interests in Ottawa about the need to safeguard Canada's claims to Arctic sovereignty A wargame was held in 1986 where the Canadian Air-Sea Transportable Brigade Group (CAST) was ordered to Norway. The CAST operation was a fiasco and showed Canada could not move a military force to Norway, and by implication the Arctic, with the necessary speed.

In 1987, the new Defence Minister, Perrin Beatty, brought in a white paper, Challenge and Commitment, proposing a major increase in the military budget with the Army to field three divisions, two for NATO in central Europe, and another for the defence of Canada. The white paper also promised to buy a dozen nuclear submarines for the defence of Arctic sovereignty, and this aspect of the white paper generated so much opposition, both at home and in the United States, that nothing came of it. The end of the Cold War in 1989–90 also marked the beginning of a new era of military cuts. In 1989, Beatty was replaced as defence minister with Saskatchewan politician Bill McKnight.

At the very end of the Cold War and the years just after, the Canadian Land Forces began emphasizing a concept of the "Total Force" in which greater integration between Regular Force and Reserve Force components was to be achieved, starting in 1987. Unsuccessful experiments during this period included "10/90 battalions" which were intended to be ten percent Regular Force and ninety percent reserve force. After a few years, these organizations were all undone.

Other successful and lasting changes included reorganizing regional component headquarters into larger total force headquarters. In September 1991, the five regional Militia Areas were reorganized into four Land Force Areas, and the Regular Force establishments were integrated into this chain of command based on geographic location.

== New challenges in the post-Cold War era (1990–present) ==
It was widely expected the end of the Cold War would see major defence cuts. However, the end of the Meech Lake Accord on 23 June 1990 caused a major surge of support for Quebec separatism with public opinion polls showing that 60% of Québécois supporting separatism in the aftermath of the failure of the Meech Lake Accord. For a time in 1990, Canada appeared to be on the brink of dissolution with many openly wondering when Quebec would leave Confederation. In this context, the military was seen as the last line to prevent a possible civil war between English-Canadians and French-Canadians. Contributing to the sense of crisis in 1990 and the feeling that Canada was falling apart was the Oka Crisis.

The Oka crisis began on 11 July 1990 with a shoot-out in Oka between the Mohawk Warrior Society and the Sûreté du Québec that left one police officer killed. In the face of the stand-off with the armed Warrior Society holding land that they claimed belonged to the Mohawk people in Oka and the Mercier bridge linking Montreal to the mainland being occupied by the Mohawk Warrior Society, the Quebec Premier Robert Bourassa asked for the Army to intervene to maintain "public safety" on 17 August 1990. Mulroney gave his approval, and the Chief of the Defence Staff, General John de Chastelain, ordered the 5e Groupe Brigade Mecanisee du Canada from their base at Valcartier to Oka and Montreal. On 26 August 1990, the soldiers removed with the use of force, but no bloodshed, the Mohawk Warriors who were occupying one end of the Mercier bridge. After a month of stand-off at Oka, where the soldiers endured much verbal abuse, the Mohawk Warriors abandoned the confrontation and engaged in a melee with the soldiers on 26 September 1990.

The performance of the French-Canadian soldiers of the Royal 22^{e} Régiment during the Oka crisis won the Army unusual praise in generally anti-militarist Quebec, with many Canadians being surprised watching on their TVs at the discipline of the Army in the face of much provocation. One consequence of the crises of 1990 was the post-Cold War cuts were not as drastic as expected with the defence minister Marcel Masse announcing in September 1991 that the Canadian Forces would close their bases in Germany by 1995 and the military were to lose only 10% of their personnel. In fact, the Canadian bases in Germany at Lahr and Baden-Soellingen were closed on 30 July 1993, two years ahead of schedule, and Canadian Forces Europe was abolished.

Mobile Command took part in several international missions following the fall of Communism in Eastern Europe. Aside from playing a minor part in the Gulf War in 1991, Canadian Forces were heavily committed to several UN and NATO missions in the former Yugoslavia which tested the shrinking military's abilities and resources.

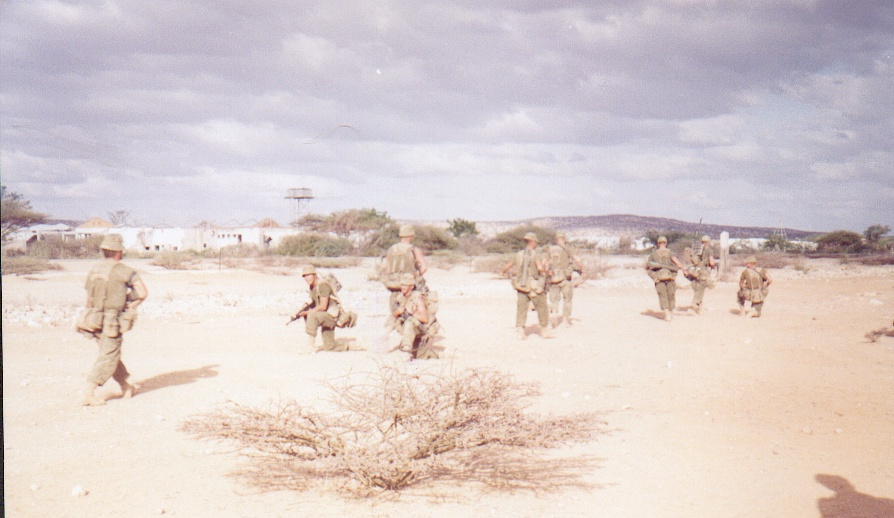
Canadian soldiers during Operation Deliverance. While most of the objectives were achieved, the Somalia Affair was a controversial scandal for the Army, after two soldiers beat a Somali teenager to death.

In 1995, the Canadian Airborne Regiment was disbanded after the Somalia affair. Aside from the disbandment of Canada's Airborne Regiment (which did not end parachute capability in the CF, as qualified jumpers were simply reorganized into jump companies of the 3 remaining Regular Force regiments), Somalia had other institutional effects on the military. Chief among these was sensitivity training such as LDA (Leadership in a Diverse Army) and SHARP (Standard for Harassment and Racism Prevention) which became mandatory for all members of the Canadian Forces. The training was a reaction to so-called "hazing videos" of members of the Airborne that came to light after the murder in Somalia.

A number of other decisions unrelated to Somalia also reflected changing social values in Canadian society and the Army during the 1990s. Women in Highland regiments were permitted to wear the kilt beginning in the 1990s; a form of dress traditionally gender related. Aboriginals were permitted by regulation to grow long hair in traditional braids, and the turban was accepted as a form of headdress for Sikhs.

In 1995, a Special Commission on the Restructuring of the Reserves was commissioned. In 1998, Mobile Command was renamed Land Force Command. On August 15, 2011, Land Force Command was renamed the Canadian Army.

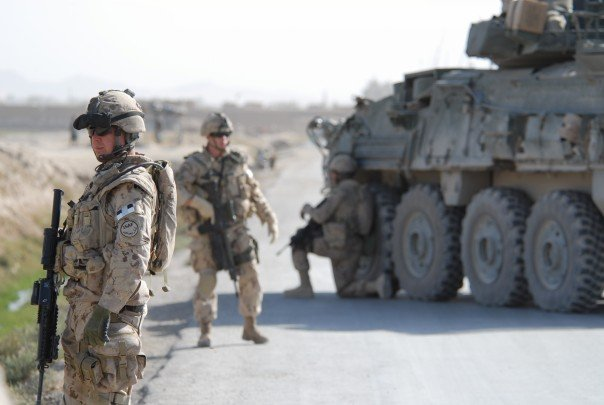
Soldiers from the Canadian Grenadier Guards in the Kandahar Province of Afghanistan.

Joint Task Force 2 was created in the wake of a decision to move counter-terrorism duties from the RCMP to the Canadian Forces. Canada participated in the 2001 invasion of Afghanistan during which time emergency equipment purchases were made, including world class artillery and armoured Nyala patrol vehicles, replacing aging howitzers and Iltis utility cars. In 2006, a new Canadian Special Operations Regiment was created as part of the major reorganization of the CF by Chief of the Defence Staff General Rick Hillier. Special operation units fall under Canadian Special Operations Command.

In January 1999, the one metre of accumulated snow was deemed beyond the capabilities of Toronto's removal crews and Mayor Mel Lastman "called in the cavalry". The Army had done duty before then with at least two natural disasters: from sandbagging floods in Winnipeg to cleaning up after ice storms in Operation Recuperation. More recently, in 2019 New Brunswick was overcome with floods and the Army served the call.

In April 2020, the civilians needed rescue service from the Army in Operation LASER, to help them with Long-Term Care Facility (LTCF)-resident senior citizens in Ontario and Quebec that fell prey to the COVID-19 pandemic in Canada.

== Integration of women ==
The Canadian Women's Army Corps was created in the Second World War as a separate corps of the Army, and remained so until the 1960s when women were integrated into the Canadian Forces. Women were restricted to certain trades, though by the 1990s were accepted into all trades. Captain Nichola Goddard was the first female combat soldier killed when she died in battle in Afghanistan in 2006.

The first 'lady cadets' graduated from Royal Military College of Canada in the 1980s.

== Canadian Army flags ==
To help distinguish its soldiers from British forces, the flag of the Canadian Active Service Force, also known as the Battle Flag of Canada, was approved for use on December 7, 1939, as the Army's command flag. The flag was designed by Colonel Archer Fortescue Duguid, Director of the Historical Section at National Defence Headquarters. The battle flag was not popular, and its use was discontinued on January 22, 1944. After the Second World War, the Canadian Army did not have its own distinctive command flag or Ensign, but simply used the Canadian National Flag as a service flag when required. In 1989, Mobile Command requested and received a command flag, which was designed in the standard command flag pattern, with the Canadian flag in the canton, and the badge in the fly.

The Union Jack was also used as the Army's service flag (flown at various army installations) along with the Red Ensign until 1965, after which the current Canadian Flag was exclusively used.

=== Service flags ===
The Red Ensign; service flag 1944–1957.

Modified Red Ensign; service flag 1957–1965.

Canadian national flag; service flag; 1965–present.

=== Canadian Army command flags ===
The Canadian Army Battle Flag; command flag 1939–1944. No other command flag was authorised for use until 1989.

Mobile Command flag; command flag 1968–1998.

Land Force Command flag; command flag 1998–2013.

Canadian Army command flag; command flag 2013–2016. Limited production prior to approval of current flag.

Canadian Army command flag; command flag 2016–present.

== Leadership ==
The Commander of the Canadian Army is the institutional head of the Canadian Army. The post was titled General Officer Commanding the Forces (Canada) from 1875 to 1904 when the withdrawal of British forces from Canada took place. It was then called Chief of the General Staff from 1904 until 1964 when the position was abolished with the unification of Canada's military forces. The appointment was titled Commander of Mobile Command from 1965 to 1993 and Chief of the Land Staff from 1993 to 2011. In 2011, Land Force Command was renamed the Canadian Army at which time the appointment was renamed to its present incarnation.

== See also ==
- Bibliography of Canadian military history
- Military history of Canada
- Canadian Militia
- Royal Military College of Canada
- Supplementary Order of Battle
