= Chiefs of Staff Committee (disambiguation) =

The Chiefs of Staff Committee is the most senior military personnel in the British Armed Forces.

Chiefs of Staff Committee may also refer to:

- Chiefs of Staff Committee (Canada), was a 1951–1964 committee comprising the heads of the three military services
- Chiefs of Staff Committee (India), an administrative forum of the senior-most military leaders of the Indian Armed Forces
