= Frank Robert Miller =

Canadian air marshal

Air Chief Marshal Frank Robert Miller CC CBE CD
- Born: April 30, 1908; Kamloops, British Columbia, Canada
- Died: October 20, 1997 (aged 89); Charlottesville, Virginia, US
- Military career
- Allegiance: Canada
- Branch: Royal Canadian Air Force
- Service years: 1931–1955, 1960–1966
- Rank: Air Chief Marshal
- Conflicts: World War II
- Awards: Companion of the Order of Canada; Commander of the Order of the British Empire; Canadian Forces' Decoration
- Other work: Deputy minister of National Defence

Air Chief Marshal (Note: This rank was used during the existence of the Royal Canadian Air Force and replaced with the rank of general in 1968 with the unification of the Canadian Forces. Miller was the only Canadian air chief marshal to hold the rank in an active capacity. The only other Canadian air chief marshal was Lloyd Samuel Breadner, who was granted the rank on retirement.) Frank Robert Miller CC CBE CD (April 30, 1908 – October 20, 1997) was a Canadian airman, the last Chairman of the Chiefs of Staff Committee in 1964, the first chief of the Defence Staff from 1964 until 1966, and deputy minister of National Defence. He held a range of Air Force training appointments during World War II.

== Military career ==
Frank Robert Miller was born in Kamloops, British Columbia, on April 30, 1908, to Hedley Miller and his wife Mary. After completing his education at the University of Alberta (where he gained a BSc) Miller joined the Royal Canadian Air Force at Camp Borden on September 15, 1931, with the rank of pilot officer. He received his wings on December 16 and was promoted to flying officer. Miller then underwent further training before becoming an instructor at the Camp Borden flying and navigation school in 1935. Promoted to flight lieutenant on September 1, 1937, he taught at the Air Navigation and Seaplane School, Trenton from May 1937 to September 1938. In September 1938, Miller was posted to England to attend the Specialist Air Navigation Course at the School of Air Navigation, RAF Manston, during which time he was promoted to squadron leader on April 1, 1939. At the outbreak of war in September, Miller was the Officer Commanding of the Air Navigation and Reconnaissance School, Trenton. He was promoted to acting wing commander in December 1940. From May 1942 Miller commanded the Air Navigation School at Rivers, Manitoba. Promoted to acting group captain in July, he commanded the General Reconnaissance School on Prince Edward Island before moving to the Air Force Headquarters in January 1943 where he served as Director of Training Plans and Requirements. He was promoted to acting air commodore in January 1943.

In 1944 Miller was posted to England and on September 19 he took up command of RAF Bomber Command's No. 61 Base in North Yorkshire, with the substantive rank of air commodore from October 14. No 61 Base was headquartered at Topcliffe and commanded the RAF establishments at Dalton, Dishforth, and Wombleton. On November 9 Millar's command was redesignated No. 76 Base and Gamston in Nottinghamshire was added as a subordinate unit. On January 13, 1945, Miller took up command of No. 63 Base which was responsible for RAF Leeming (headquarters) and RAF Skipton-on-Swale.

After the war, Miller served in several senior positions in the Royal Canadian Air Force. In September 1951, Miller was promoted to vice-chief of the Air Staff with the rank of air vice-marshal, serving until 1954. He was then posted to Supreme Headquarters Allied Powers Europe as General Lauris Norstad’s Vice-Deputy Air. Gaining promotion to air marshal in 1955 he then retired from the RCAF at Prime Minister Louis St. Laurent's request to serve in the senior civil service position of deputy minister of National Defence, remaining in post until 1957. He then became Deputy Commander-in-Chief NORAD. In 1960, he was appointed Chairman of the Chiefs of Staff Committee, gaining promotion to air chief marshal on September 1, 1961. Three years later he became the first chief of the Defence Staff, serving from 1964 until 1966. As chief of the Defence Staff, Miller was opposed to the plans of the Defence Minister Paul Hellyer to merge the Royal Canadian Air Force, the Royal Canadian Navy and the Canadian Army into one service, and in 1966 resigned in protest, saying he could not in good conscience co-operate with Hellyer's plans.

In 1972 Miller was made a Companion of the Order of Canada. He died on October 20, 1997.

== Orders, decorations, and medals ==
Miller received the following orders and decorations during his life & military career:

Ribbon	Description	Notes
	Companion of the Order of Canada (CC)	Appointed Companion (CC) on 23 December 1972
	Commander of the Most Excellent Order of the British Empire (CBE)	Promoted to Commander on 13 June 1946; Appointed Officer of the British Empire (OBE) 14 June 1945
	France and Germany Star	
	Defence Medal	
	Canadian Volunteer Service Medal	With Overseas Service clasp
	1939-1945 War Medal	Mention in Dispatches (MiD) awarded on 1 January 1945
	Special Service Medal	Awarded with NATO-OTAN Clasp; Miller was awarded the SSM but never wore it
	Canadian Forces' Decoration (CD)	With one Clasp for 22 years of service

== Academic qualifications ==
- Bachelor of Science (BSc)
- Doctor of Laws (LLD)

== Notes ==
Government offices
Preceded by Charles Drury	Deputy Minister of National Defence; 1955–1960	Succeeded by Elgin Armstrong
Military offices
Preceded by J L Hurley	Air Officer Commanding No. 61 Base; September – November 1944	Base disestablished on renumbering as No. 76 Base
New title Base established by renumbering No. 61 Base	Air Officer Commanding No. 76 Base; November 1944 – January 1945	Succeeded by J G Kerr
Preceded by J G Bryans	Air Officer Commanding No. 63 Base; January – May 1945	Succeeded by J G Kerr
Unknown	Air Officer Commanding Maintenance Command; June 1946 – August 1948	Succeeded by Ralph McBurney; As AOC Air Materiel Command
Unknown	Air Member Operations and Training; 1949–1951	Unknown
Unknown	Vice-Chief of the Air Staff; 1951–1954	Succeeded by Clarence Dunlap
Preceded by Charles Foulkes	Chairman of the Chiefs of Staff Committee; 1960–1964	Committee replaced by the Armed Forces Council
Preceded by Creation of position	Chief of the Defence Staff; 1964–1966	Succeeded by Jean Victor Allard
