= Jean Victor Allard =

Canadian Chief of the Defence Staff (1966–1969)

General Jean Victor Allard CC CBE GOQ DSO & Two Bars ED CD
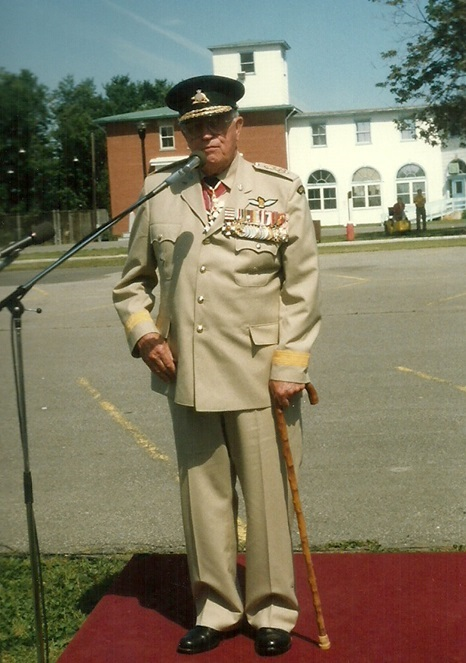
- General Jean Victor Allard, CDS
- Born: 12 June 1913; Sainte-Monique-de-Nicolet, Quebec
- Died: 23 April 1996 (aged 82); Trois-Rivières, Quebec
- Military career
- Allegiance: Canada
- Branch: Canadian Army / Canadian Forces
- Service years: 1933–1969
- Rank: General
- Commands: Chief of the Defence Staff; Commander, Mobile Command; 25th Canadian Infantry Brigade; 6th Canadian Infantry Brigade; Royal 22^{e} Régiment
- Conflicts: World War II; Korean War
- Awards: Companion of the Order of Canada; Commander of the Order of the British Empire; Grand Officer of the National Order of Quebec; Companion of the Distinguished Service Order & Two Bars
- Other work: Inventor, diplomat, and amateur painter.

General Jean Victor Allard CC, CBE, GOQ, DSO & Two Bars, ED, CD (12 June 1913 – 23 April 1996) was the first French Canadian to become Chief of the Defence Staff, the highest position in the Canadian Forces, from 1966 to 1969. He was also the first to hold the accompanying rank of general.

== Military career ==
Allard served as an officer in the Régiment de Trois-Rivières prior to World War II. After the outbreak of war in 1939, he was attested to the Canadian Active Service Force and promoted to the rank of major. When the active component of his regiment was redesignated to become an Anglophone armoured unit, he requested a transfer to the infantry and became the Deputy Commanding Officer of Régiment de la Chaudière in England. In December 1943, he became the Commanding Officer of the Royal 22^{e} Régiment in Italy.

He was in command of the 6th Canadian Infantry Brigade at the end of the war in Germany, in the rank of brigadier (now brigadier-general). He was appointed a Companion of the Distinguished Service Order (DSO) on three occasions, the first time being in April 1944, and the second in March 1945.

He was the Canadian military attaché in Moscow after the war until 1948 when he was appointed Commander for the East Quebec Area. During the Korean War, he commanded the 25th Canadian Infantry Brigade from April 1953. He signed the truce at Panmunjon on Canada's behalf on 27 July 1953. He became commander of the 3rd Canadian Infantry Brigade in 1954 and Commander of the Eastern Quebec Area in 1956. In 1958 he was made Vice-Chief of the General Staff.

As a major-general, he commanded the British 4th Division from 1961 to 1963, as part of the British Army of the Rhine (BAOR). In 1964 he was made Chief of Operational Readiness. As a lieutenant-general, he was Commander, Mobile Command from 1965 to 1966, comprising the Canadian land forces in Canada and, at that time, the close air support forces, as well.

In July 1966, Allard was promoted to full general. From 1966 to 1969, he was Chief of the Defence Staff.

In 1985, he published his memoirs, with English translation in 1988 The memoirs of General Jean V. Allard, written in cooperation with Serge Bernier.

== Honours ==
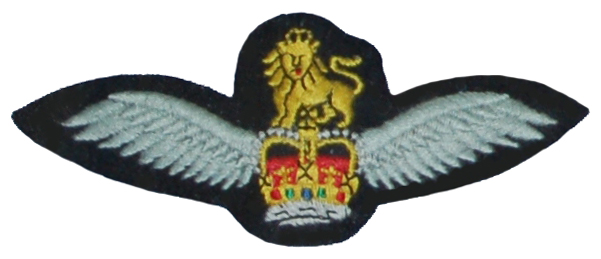

Ribbon	Description	Notes
	Companion of the Order of Canada (C.C.)	Awarded on: June 28, 1968; Invested on: November 12, 1968; "Former Chief of the Defence Staff. In recognition of his brilliant military career."
	Commander of the Most Excellent Order of the British Empire (CBE)	1946
	Serving Member of the Most Venerable Order of the Hospital of Saint John of Jerusalem	
	Grand officier de l'Ordre national du Québec (GOQ)	1992
	Companion of the Distinguished Service Order and two bars (DSO)	18 March 1944 – awarded as a lieutenant-colonel; 20 January 1945 – awarded first bar as a lieutenant-colonel; 10 November 1945 – awarded second bar as a brigadier
	1939–1945 Star	For services during World War II
	Italy Star	For services during World War II in Italy
	France and Germany Star	For services during World War II in France and Germany
	Defence Medal	For services during World War II
	Canadian Volunteer Service Medal with Overseas Service bar	As a Canadian who volunteered to serve within the Canadian Army during World War II
	War Medal 1939–1945	For services during World War II
	Korea Medal	For services during the Korean War; Canadian issue of the medal
	Canadian Volunteer Service Medal for Korea	1991; For services during the Korean War
	United Nations Korea Medal	For services during the Korean War
	Queen Elizabeth II Coronation Medal	1953
	Canadian Centennial Medal	1967; As Chief of Defence Staff (Canada) and a member of the Canadian order of precedence.
	Queen Elizabeth II Silver Jubilee Medal for Canada	1977; As a Companion of the Order of Canada, he is awarded automatically with this medal.
	125th Anniversary of the Confederation of Canada Medal	1993; As a Companion of the Order of Canada, he is awarded automatically with this medal.
	Efficiency Decoration (ED)	1947
	Canadian Forces' Decoration (CD)	1959
	Bronze Lion	1948
	Chevalier de l'Ordre national de la Légion d'honneur	1950
	Croix de Guerre avec Palme en Bronze	1950
	Officer of the Legion of Merit	1954

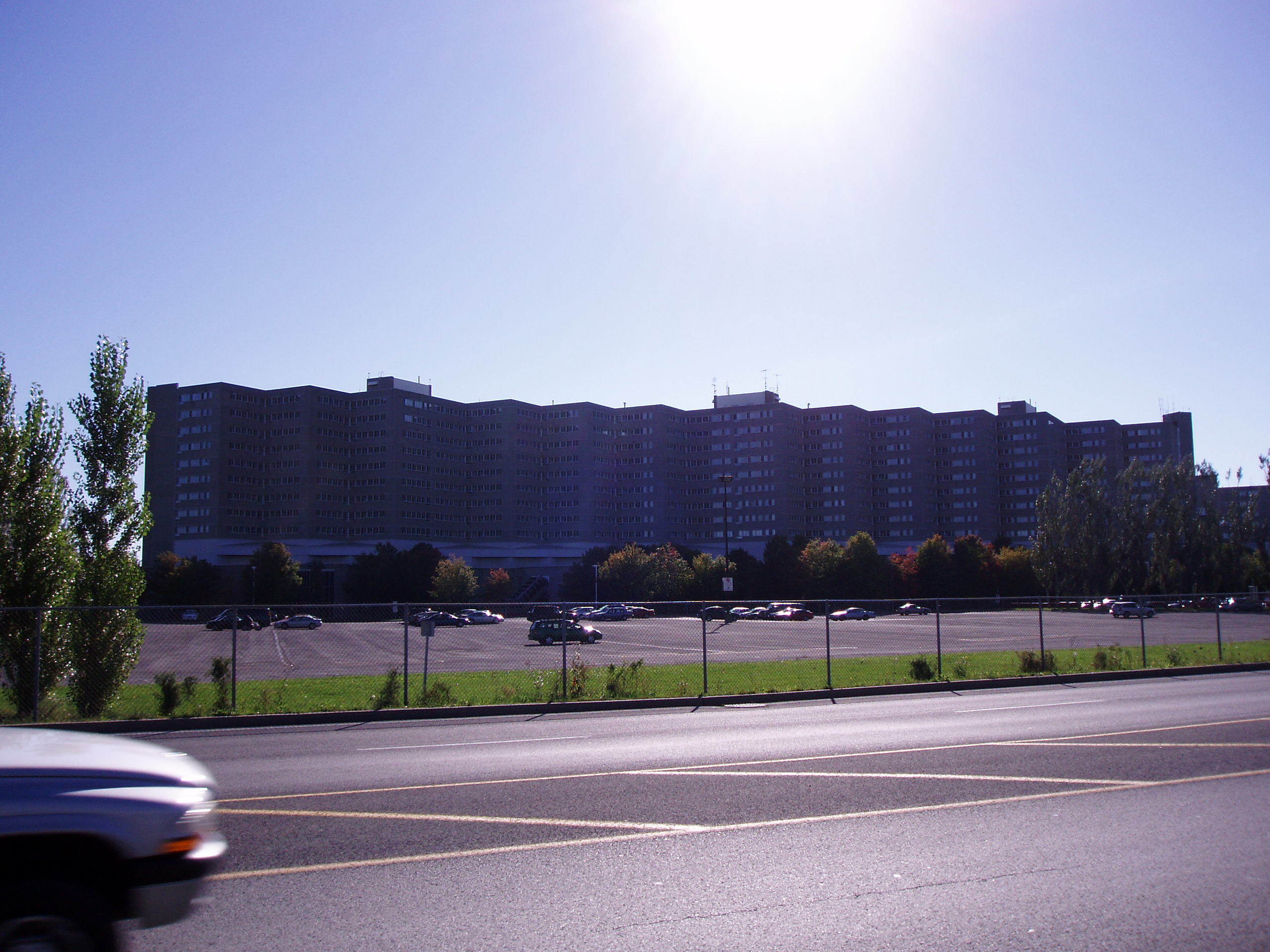
Général-Jean-Victor-Allard Building

The Général-Jean-Victor-Allard Building, the home of the Canadian Forces Leadership and Recruit School, was named in honour of General Allard.

Military offices
Preceded by Lieutenant Colonel J.P.E. Bernatchez	CO Royal 22^{e} Régiment; 1943–1945	Succeeded by Lieutenant Colonel G.A. Turcot
Preceded by Desmond Gordon	GOC 4th Division; 1961–1963	Succeeded by Basil Eugster
Preceded by Geoffrey Walsh (as Chief of the General Staff)	Commander, Mobile Command; 1965–1966	Succeeded by William Anderson
Preceded by F.R. Miller	Chief of the Defence Staff; 1966–1969	Succeeded by F.R. Sharp
Honorary titles
Preceded by Lieutenant Colonel P.J. Addy	Colonel of the 12^{e} Régiment blindé du Canada; 1969–1979	Succeeded by Lieutenant Colonel M.R. Gaulin
Preceded by Lieutenant General J. Chouinard	Colonel of the Royal 22^{e} Régiment; 1985–1988	Succeeded by Major General R.A. Reid
