= Chief of the Defence Staff (Canada) =

Commander of the Canadian Armed Forces

- Chef d'état-major de la Défense
- Distinguishing flag of the CDS

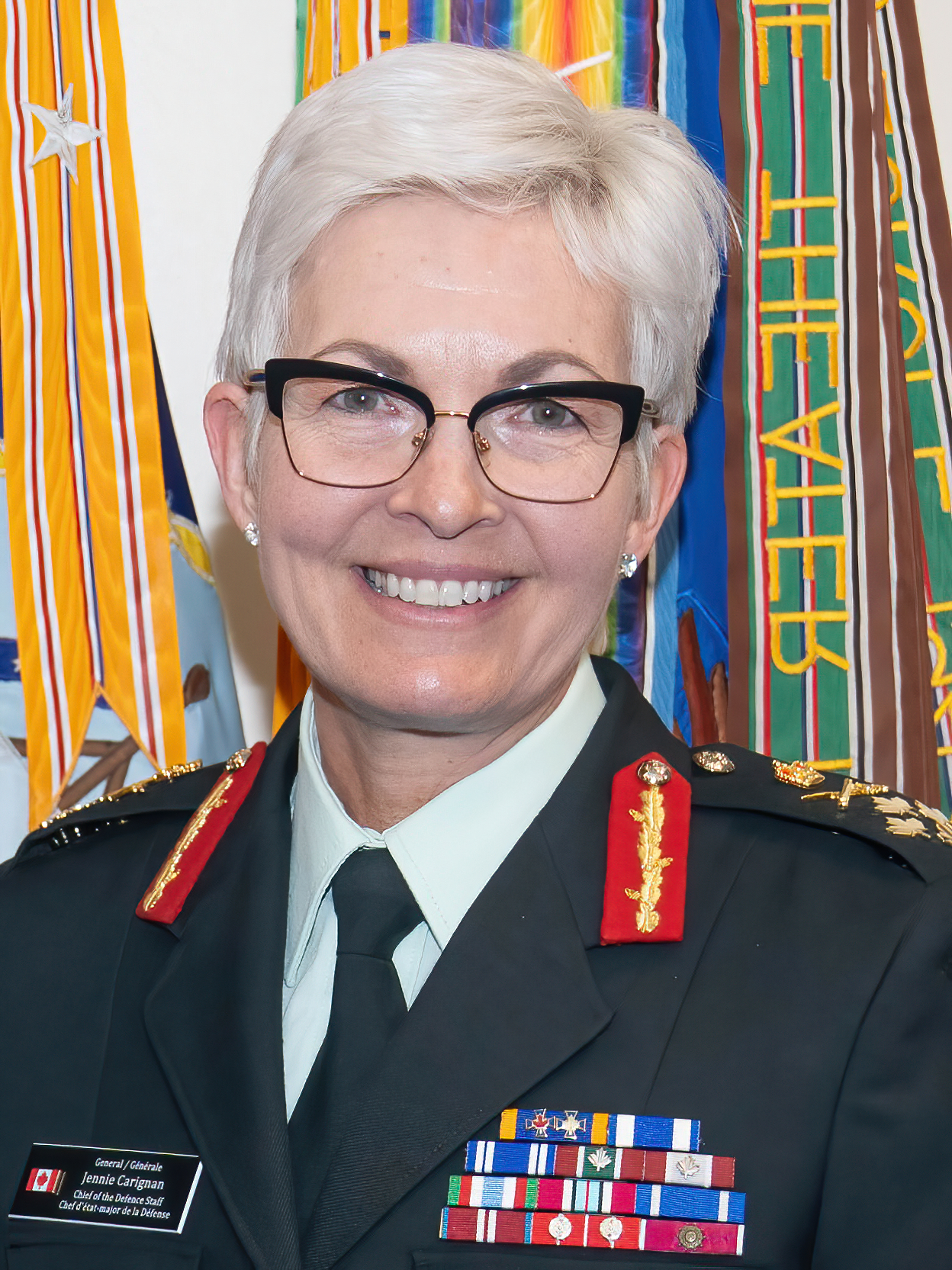
- Incumbent; General Jennie Carignan since 18 July 2024
- Canadian Armed Forces
- Type: Chief of defence
- Abbreviation: CDS
- Member of: Armed Forces Council
- Reports to: Commander-in-Chief via the Minister of National Defence
- Appointer: King of Canada or the Governor General of Canada on the advice of the Prime Minister of Canada
- Term length: At His Majesty's Pleasure
- Constituting instrument: National Defence Act
- Precursor: Chairman of the Chiefs of Staff Committee
- Formation: 1964
- First holder: Frank Robert Miller
- Deputy: Vice Chief of the Defence Staff
- Website: Official website

Chief of the Defence Staff (CDS; French: chef d'état-major de la Défense; CEMD) is the title of the professional head of the Canadian Armed Forces. As the senior military position, the CDS advises the Cabinet, particularly the minister of national defence and the prime minister. The position is a Crown-in-Council appointment made on the advice of the prime minister.

== History ==
Until 1964, there existed a chief of the Naval Staff, as head of the Royal Canadian Navy; a chief of the General Staff, as head of the Canadian Army; and a chief of the Air Staff, as head of the Royal Canadian Air Force. A position known as the Chairman of the Chiefs of Staff Committee existed from 1951 to 1964, which had a loose coordination function, although it lacked the command and control responsibilities of the later position of chief of the Defence Staff (CDS). Only two officers served in the role in its 13-year history:General Charles Foulkes (1951–1960) and Air Chief Marshal Frank Robert Miller (1960–1964).

The position of chairman of the Chiefs of Staff Committee and the positions of the three service chiefs were abolished in 1964 and replaced by the position of CDS. This change was based on a white paper initiated by National Defence Minister Paul Hellyer in the Cabinet of Prime Minister Lester B. Pearson. Following the tabling of the white paper, the minister introduced legislation that took effect in August 1964. The newly established chief of the Defence Staff was to "head all of Canada's military forces, backed by a defence headquarters that was integrated and restructured to reflect six so-called functional commands, replacing eleven former service commands. Functional described a command that was non-geographic and beyond any particular service or traditional arm." In May 1967, Bill C-243 was passed by parliament and was effective as of 1 February 1968. The law dissolved the three armed services and created the Canadian Armed Forces under the command of the CDS. In 2011, the three functional commands—named Maritime Command, Land Force Command, and Air Command—had their original names reinstated, becoming once again the Royal Canadian Navy, Canadian Army, and Royal Canadian Air Force, respectively.

== Rank and command ==
The chief of the Defence Staff (CDS) follows in rank only the commander-in-chief of the Canadian Armed Forces, who is the Canadian monarch represented by the governor general. The National Defence Act gives the authority to appoint the CDS to the Governor-in-Council; effectively, the governor general acting on the constitutional advice of their ministers of the Crown. The commander-in-chief is the person from whom the CDS receives their orders. However, according to the tenets of constitutional monarchy and responsible government, the monarch and viceroy almost always follow ministerial direction, meaning the CDS normally advises the prime minister and the rest of Cabinet directly on military matters.

The CDS has been charged with four main priorities, each having multiple sub-priorities: The first is to conduct operations, which includes the successful implementation of domestic and international operations, protection of the forces through a culture of risk management, and ensuring that recruitment is at a level required to sustain the operational forces at full potential to meet their commitments. Secondly, the CDS is expected to expand the regular and reserve forces to meet international and domestic obligations, which means the management of the Canadian Forces Recruiting Group so as to streamline the enlistment process of new forces members. The third task is to implement the national defence strategy as outlined by the King-in-Council, requiring both the acquisition of new equipment and the strengthening of diplomatic relations via the United Nations, North Atlantic Treaty Organization, and North American Aerospace Defence Command." Lastly, the CDS must enhance the forces' programme delivery while optimising the use of resources.

The CDS is also the chair of the Canadian Forces Decorations Advisory Committee, which reviews and recommends to the governor general members of the forces eligible to receive decorations for valour, bravery, and meritorious service, as well as Commander-in-Chief Unit Commendations. This committee mirrors that for the Order of Military Merit, of which the CDS is ex-officio a member and the Principal Commander.

Separately, the CDS presents the Chief of the Defence Staff Commendation (French: Mention élogieuse du Chef d'état-major de la Défense) to recognize activity or service beyond regular expectations. It can be presented to members of the Canadian Forces, civilian members of the Defence Team (in an overseas operation), and members of an allied foreign military (whose actions benefited Canada). The insignia for wear has the form of a gold bar bearing three gold maple leaves and the award comes with a scroll bearing the citation. The CDS also awards the Canadian Forces Medallion for Distinguished Service, which is given by the CDS on behalf of the entire forces.

=== Distinguishing flag ===
The CDS is entitled to fly the Canadian Armed Forces ensign – a white flag bearing the Canadian flag in the canton and defaced by the badge of the Canadian Armed Forces – as a distinguishing flag.

== Chiefs of the Defence Staff ==
No.	Portrait	Name	Took office	Left office	Time in office	Home province	Defence branch	Appointed by	Prime minister	Ref.
1	Frank Robert Miller	Air Chief Marshal (Note: This rank was used during the 20th century existence of the Royal Canadian Air Force and replaced with the rank of general in 1968 with the unification of the Canadian Forces. See Category:Canadian Forces Air Command generals for such officers. Miller was one of only two Canadian Air Chief Marshals, the other being Lloyd Samuel Breadner); Frank Robert Miller (1908–1997)	1 August 1964	14 July 1966	1 year, 347 days	British Columbia	Royal Canadian Air Force	Georges Vanier	Lester B. Pearson	
2	Jean-Victor Allard	General; Jean-Victor Allard (1913–1996)	15 July 1966	14 September 1969	3 years, 61 days	Quebec	Canadian Army	Georges Vanier	Lester B. Pearson	
3	Frederick Ralph Sharp	General; Frederick Ralph Sharp (1915–1992)	15 September 1969	14 September 1972	2 years, 365 days	Saskatchewan	Air Command	Roland Michener	Pierre Trudeau	
4	Jacques Alfred Dextraze	General; Jacques Alfred Dextraze (1919–1993)	15 September 1972	31 August 1977	4 years, 350 days	Quebec	Mobile Command	Jules Léger	Pierre Trudeau	
5	Robert Hilborn Falls	Admiral; Robert Hilborn Falls (1924–2009)	15 September 1977	30 May 1980	2 years, 258 days	Ontario	Maritime Command	Jules Léger	Pierre Trudeau	
6	Ramsey Muir Withers	General; Ramsey Muir Withers (1930–2014)	31 May 1980	30 June 1983	3 years, 30 days	Ontario	Mobile Command	Edward Schreyer	Pierre Trudeau	
7	Gérard Charles Édouard Thériault	General; Gérard Charles Édouard Thériault (1932–1998)	1 July 1983	2 July 1986	3 years, 1 day	Quebec	Air Command	Edward Schreyer	Pierre Trudeau	
8	Paul David Manson	General; Paul David Manson (1934–2023)	11 July 1986	8 September 1989	3 years, 59 days	British Columbia	Air Command	Jeanne Sauvé	Brian Mulroney	
9	John de Chastelain	General; John de Chastelain (born 1937)	8 September 1989	29 January 1993	3 years, 143 days	Alberta	Mobile Command	Jeanne Sauvé	Brian Mulroney	
10	John Rogers Anderson	Admiral; John Rogers Anderson (born 1941)	29 January 1993	31 December 1993	336 days	British Columbia	Maritime Command	Ray Hnatyshyn	Brian Mulroney; Jean Chrétien	
9	John de Chastelain	General; John de Chastelain (born 1937)	1 January 1994	31 December 1995	1 year, 364 days	Alberta	Land Force Command	Ray Hnatyshyn	Jean Chrétien	
11	Joseph Édouard Jean Boyle	General; Joseph Édouard Jean Boyle (born 1947)	1 January 1996	8 October 1996	281 days	Ontario	Air Command	Roméo LeBlanc	Jean Chrétien	
–	Larry Murray	Vice-Admiral; Larry Murray (born 1947); Acting	8 October 1996	17 September 1997	344 days	Ontario	Maritime Command	Roméo LeBlanc	Jean Chrétien	
12	Maurice Baril	General; Maurice Baril (born 1943)	17 September 1997	28 June 2001	3 years, 284 days	Quebec	Land Force Command	Roméo LeBlanc	Jean Chrétien	
13	Raymond Henault	General; Raymond Henault (born 1949)	28 June 2001	17 June 2005	3 years, 354 days	Manitoba	Air Command	Adrienne Clarkson	Jean Chrétien	
14	Rick Hillier	General; Rick Hillier (born 1955)	17 June 2005	1 July 2008	3 years, 14 days	Newfoundland and Labrador	Land Force Command	Adrienne Clarkson	Paul Martin; Stephen Harper	
15	Walter Natynczyk	General; Walter Natynczyk (born 1957)	1 July 2008	29 October 2012	4 years, 120 days	Manitoba	Canadian Army (Note: Known as Land Force Command until 2011)	Michaëlle Jean	Stephen Harper	
16	Thomas J. Lawson	General; Thomas J. Lawson (born 1957)	29 October 2012	17 July 2015	2 years, 261 days	Ontario	Royal Canadian Air Force	David Johnston	Stephen Harper	
17	Jonathan Vance	General; Jonathan Vance (born 1964)	17 July 2015	14 January 2021	5 years, 181 days	Ontario	Canadian Army	David Johnston	Stephen Harper; Justin Trudeau	
18	Art McDonald	Admiral; Art McDonald (born 1967)	14 January 2021	24 February 2021	41 days	Nova Scotia	Royal Canadian Navy	Julie Payette	Justin Trudeau	
19	Wayne Eyre	General; Wayne Eyre (born 1966 or 1967)	25 February 2021 (Note: Acting from 25 February 2021 until 25 November 2021)	18 July 2024	3 years, 144 days	Saskatchewan	Canadian Army	Mary Simon (Note: Appointed in acting capacity by Administrator of Canada Richard Wagner)	Justin Trudeau	
20	Jennie Carignan	General; Jennie Carignan (born 1968)	18 July 2024	Incumbent	2 years, 99 days	Quebec	Canadian Army	Mary Simon	Justin Trudeau; Mark Carney	

== See also ==
- Chief of the Defence Force (Australia)
- Chief of the Defence Staff (United Kingdom)
- Chairman of the Joint Chiefs of Staff
