= Chiefs of Staff Committee (Canada) =

Collection of the heads of each military service in Canada

Chairman of the Chiefs of Staff Committee
- Formation: 1951
- First holder: Charles Foulkes
- Final holder: Frank Robert Miller
- Abolished: August 1964
- Superseded by: Chief of the Defence Staff

The Chiefs of Staff Committee was a 1951–1964 committee comprising the heads of the three military services then in Canada: the Royal Canadian Navy, the Canadian Army and the Royal Canadian Air Force. The Chiefs of Staff Committee consisted of the Chief of the Naval Staff, the Chief of the General Staff, the Chief of the Air Staff, and a Chairman who held a rank one level higher (full Air Chief Marshal, Admiral or General) than the service heads.

A 1964 white paper proposed significant changes to the command structure of Canada's armed forces. While unification of the Canadian Armed Forces was not completed until 1968, the Chiefs of Staff Committee was replaced in 1964 by the Armed Forces Council, and the position of Chairman was replaced by the position of Chief of the Defence Staff with greatly expanded powers and functions.

== List of chairmen ==
| No. | Portrait | Chairmen of the Chiefs of Staff Committee | Took office | Left office | Time in office | Home province | Defence branch | Appointed by | Prime Minister | Ref. |
|---|---|---|---|---|---|---|---|---|---|---|
| 1 | Charles Foulkes | General; Charles Foulkes (1903–1969) | 1951 | 1960 | 8–9 years | Ontario | Canadian Army | Georges Vanier | Louis Saint Laurent | |
| 2 | Frank Robert Miller | General; Frank Robert Miller (1908–1997) | 1960 | 1964 | 3–4 years | British Columbia | Royal Canadian Air Force | Georges Vanier | Lester B. Pearson | |
