= French-Canadian Brigade =

Brigade of the Canadian Army

The French-Canadian Brigade was an intended unit in the Canadian Expeditionary Force during the First World War, but never established.

Although it was assigned a block of 3000 regimental numbers (2320301-2323300), only the first 119 were used. Recruiting took place in Military District 10 (M.D. 10)--primarily in Manitoba, which has a sizeable French-Canadian population—in early 1917. Approximately one-half of the recruits were born outside of Canada and represented six countries: France (18), United States of America (9), Belgium (6), Switzerland (5), England (1), Russia (1). Of those born in Canada, the majority came from Manitoba (29) and Quebec (24); two other provinces are represented: Saskatchewan (7) and Ontario (2). A number of the recruits were subsequently reassigned to the Canadian Forestry Corps.
