= Charles Foulkes (Canadian Army officer) =

British-Canadian general

Charles Foulkes CC CB CBE DSO CD
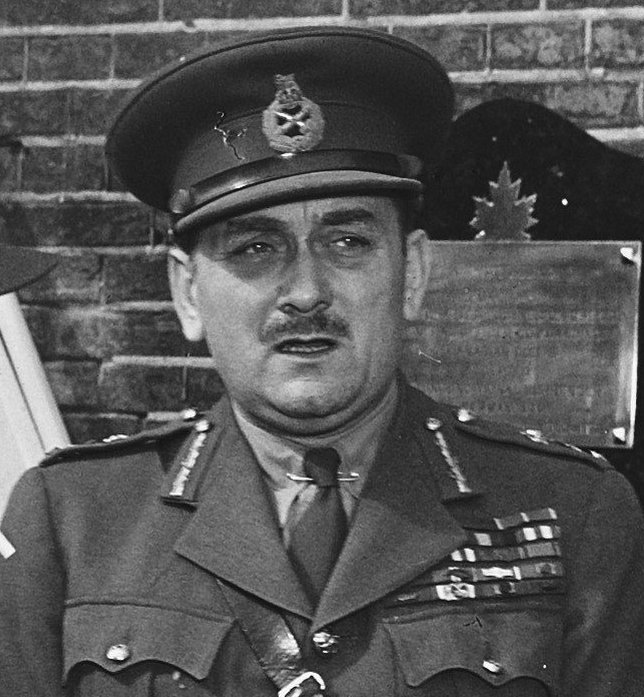
- Foulkes in 1948
- Born: 3 January 1903; Stockton-on-Tees, County Durham, England
- Died: 12 September 1969 (aged 66); Ottawa, Ontario, Canada
- Military career
- Allegiance: Canada
- Branch: Canadian Army
- Service years: 1926–1960
- Rank: General
- Units: The Royal Canadian Regiment
- Commands: Chief of the General Staff; Chairman of the Chiefs of Staff Committee; I Canadian Corps; 2nd Canadian Infantry Division; 3rd Canadian Infantry Brigade
- Conflicts: World War II
- Awards: Companion of the Order of Canada; Companion of the Order of the Bath; Commander of the Order of the British Empire; Distinguished Service Order; Canadian Forces' Decoration; Commander of the Legion of Honour (France)

General Charles Foulkes, CC, CB, CBE, DSO, CD (3 January 1903 – 12 September 1969) was a Canadian soldier, and an officer of The Royal Canadian Regiment.

== Military career ==
One of eight children, Foulkes was born in Stockton-on-Tees, England, on 3 January 1903. His family moved to Canada, eventually settling at 230 Hill Street in London, Ontario. He completed his secondary school education at the London Collegiate Institute (now Central Secondary School) before going to the University of Western Ontario.

He joined the Canadian Militia in 1926. In 1937 he attended the Staff College in Camberley, England. His report concluded that he was, "Sound and competent, and possessed of drive and determination."

At the outbreak of the Second World War in September 1939, Foulkes was serving as a major with the 3rd Canadian Infantry Brigade of the 1st Canadian Infantry Division. He went on to be a General Staff Officer with 3rd Canadian Infantry Division. After serving as the 3rd Brigade's commander from August 1942, he was appointed General Officer Commanding (GOC) of the 2nd Canadian Infantry Division in January 1944 and led the division through the Normandy Campaign. In November 1944 he was made General Officer Commanding I Canadian Corps in Italy before it returned to Northwest Europe in early 1945. He received rapid promotion during the war, rising from major in 1939 to lieutenant-general in 1944.

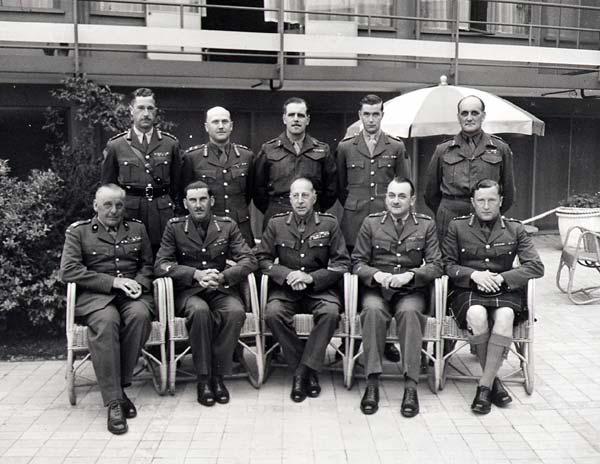
Senior commanders of the First Canadian Army, May 1945. Seated from the left: Stanisław Maczek (Polish Army), Guy Simonds, Harry Crerar, Charles Foulkes, Bert Hoffmeister. Standing from the left: Ralph Keefler, Bruce Matthews, Harry Foster, Robert Moncel (standing in for Chris Vokes, Stuart Rawlins (British Army).

On 4 May 1945, south of Hamburg, Field Marshal Sir Bernard Law Montgomery accepted the unconditional surrender of the German forces in the Netherlands, northwest Germany including all islands, in Denmark and all naval ships in those areas. The surrender preceded the end of World War II in Europe and was signed in a carpeted tent at Montgomery's headquarters on the Timeloberg hill at Wendisch Evern.

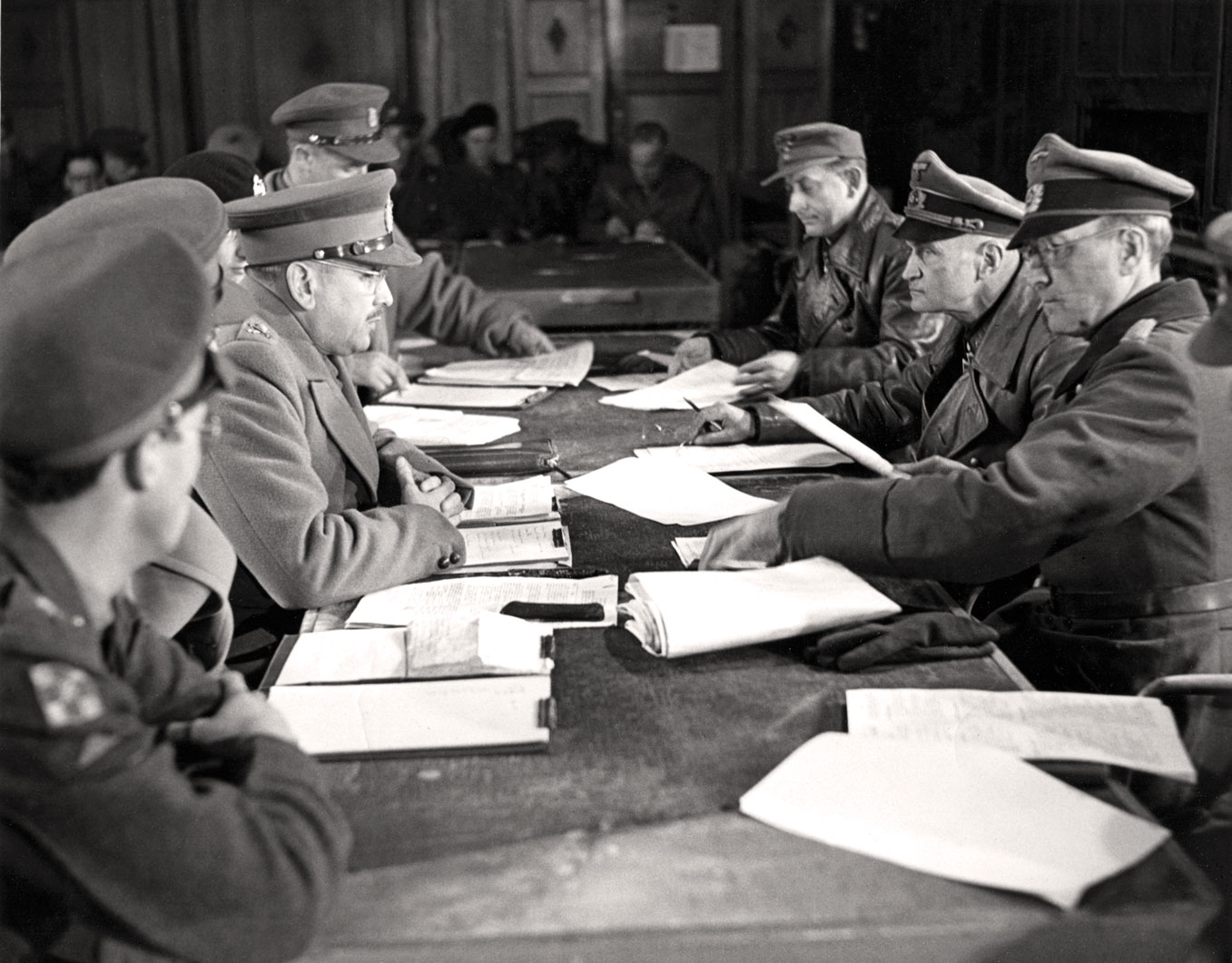
Lieutenant-General Charles Foulkes (left centre), GOC I Canadian Corps, accepts the surrender of German forces in the Netherlands from General Johannes Blaskowitz (right centre).

On 5 May 1945, Foulkes summoned German General Blaskowitz to the Hotel de Wereld in Wageningen to discuss the surrender of German forces in the Netherlands. His Royal Highness Prince Bernhard, acting as commander in chief of the Dutch Interior Forces, attended the meeting as well. Blaskowitz agreed with all of the proposals made by Foulkes. However, nowhere in the building – some sources claim: nowhere in the whole town – could a typewriter be found. Thus the surrender document could not be typed. The next day, 6 May, both parties returned, and in the presence of both General Foulkes and Prince Bernhard, Blaskowitz signed the surrender document which in the meantime had been typed.

After the war, Foulkes was appointed Chief of the General Staff (CGS) and, in 1951, the year he was promoted to full general, the first Chairman of the Chiefs of Staff Committee. General Guy Simonds as army chief clashed with Foulkes about where to station the newly envisaged Canadian force in West Germany. The continentalist Foulkes, who wanted to move Canada closer to the United States, wanted the Canadians to serve with the U.S. Army forces in southern West Germany. Simonds by contrast argued that for historical reasons the Canadians should serve with the British forces in northern West Germany, arguing that the Canadians would fight better with them if the Soviet Ground Forces and their Eastern European satellites should invade West Germany. Simonds stated that the Canadians had fought alongside the British successively in the Boer War, the First World War, the Second World War, and the Korean War, and moreover the Canadian Army was closely modelled after the British Army right down to having British-style uniforms and ranks and the same regimental structure; for all these reasons, Simonds felt that placing the Canadians with the British in northern West Germany would be a better fit. As the Canadian decision-makers had been "shocked by the American performance in Korea" while the British forces fighting in Korea had fought well, Simonds won the debate and it was agreed that the Canadians would serve as part of the British Army of the Rhine, though Foulkes was able to ensure the Royal Canadian Air Force (RCAF) units would serve with the United States Air Force instead of the Royal Air Force.

Foulkes retired in 1960.

In 1968 he was made a Companion of the Order of Canada. He taught at Carleton University in 1968 and 1969. He died in Ottawa in 1969.

His medals and other personal artifacts are on display at the Royal Canadian Regiment Museum in London, Ontario. He was awarded the Honorary degree of Doctor of Laws (LL.D) from the University of Western Ontario on 11 June 1947.

== Bibliography ==
- Delaney, Douglas E. (2011). Corps Commanders: Five British and Canadian Generals at War, 1939–45. Vancouver: UBC Press. ISBN 9780774820905.
- Granatstein, Jack (2005). The Generals. University of Calgary Press. ISBN 978-1-55238-176-2.

Military offices
Preceded by E. L. M. Burns	GOC 2nd Canadian Infantry Division; January–November 1944	Succeeded by Bruce Matthews
Preceded by E. L. M. Burns	GOC I Canadian Corps; 1944–1945	Succeeded by Post disbanded
Preceded by John Murchie	Chief of the General Staff; 1945–1951	Succeeded by Guy Simonds
Preceded by New post	Chairman of the Chiefs of Staff Committee; 1951–1960	Succeeded by Frank Miller
