= Armed Forces Council =

Canadian defence council

The Armed Forces Council is the senior military body of the Canadian Armed Forces. It meets to advise and assist the Chief of the Defence Staff (CDS) on all matters concerning the command, control, and administration of the forces, and generally meets once per month. It was created in 1964 to replace the Chiefs of Staff Committee in preparation for the 1968 unification of the Canadian Armed Forces. The Armed Forces Council is chaired by the CDS and consists of the following positions:

Position	Incumbent	Service
Chief of the Defence Staff	General Jennie Carignan	Canadian Army
Vice Chief of the Defence Staff	Lieutenant-General Stephen Kelsey	Canadian Army
Commander of the Royal Canadian Navy and Chief of the Naval Staff	Vice-Admiral Angus Topshee	Royal Canadian Navy
Commander of the Canadian Army and Chief of the Army Staff	Lieutenant-General Michael Wright	Canadian Army
Commander of the Royal Canadian Air Force and Chief of the Air Force Staff	Lieutenant-General Jamie Speiser-Blanchet	Royal Canadian Air Force
Commander of Canadian Special Operations Forces Command	Major-General Steven Hunter	Canadian Army
Commander of Military Personnel Command and Chief of Military Personnel		
Commander of Canadian Joint Operations Command		
Commander of Canadian Forces Intelligence Command		
Surgeon General		
Chief of Reserves and Employer Support		
Judge Advocate General		
Canadian Forces Provost Marshal		
Canadian Forces Chief Warrant Officer		
Chief of Force Development		
Director of Staff - Strategic Joint Staff		
Director General International Security Policy		
Chief of Staff (Materiel)		
Chief of Staff (Infrastructure and Environment)		
Chief of Staff (Information Management)		
Chief of Programme		

== See also ==
- Chief of the Defence Staff (Canada)
- Defence Council of the United Kingdom
- Joint Chiefs of Staff
