= General (Canada) =

Most senior rank of the Canadian Armed Forces

General Général
- Army and Air force insignia
- Country: Canada
- Service branch: Canadian Army; Royal Canadian Air Force
- Abbreviation: GEN or Gen.
- Rank group: General officer
- Rank: Four-maple leaf (four-star)
- NATO rank code: OF-9
- Formation: 19th century
- Next higher rank: Commander-in-Chief of the Canadian Armed Forces (highest)
- Next lower rank: Lieutenant-general
- Equivalent ranks: Admiral

General (Gen; French: Général [gén]) is a military rank used by the Canadian Army and Royal Canadian Air Force typically held by the officer who is serving as the chief of the Defence Staff – the senior uniformed officer of the Canadian Forces – if they belong to those elements. Admiral is the equivalent rank in the Royal Canadian Navy.

The rank insignia for a general in the Royal Canadian Air Force is a wide braid below three narrow braid on the cuff, as well as four silver maple leaves, beneath crossed sword and baton, all surmounted by St. Edward's Crown, worn on the shoulder straps of the Service Dress tunic. In the Canadian Army, the rank insignia is a wide braid on the cuff, as well as four gold maple leaves, beneath crossed sword and baton, all surmounted by St. Edward's Crown, worn on the shoulder straps of the Service Dress tunic. The rank is also worn on slip-ons on other uniforms. On the visor of the service cap are two rows of gold oak leaves.

The rank is referred to as "four-star", a reference to its American equivalent. Prior to the 1968 unification of the Canadian Forces, the equivalent rank in the Royal Canadian Air Force was air chief marshal.

Army uniform variations

Dress uniform tunic - sleeve

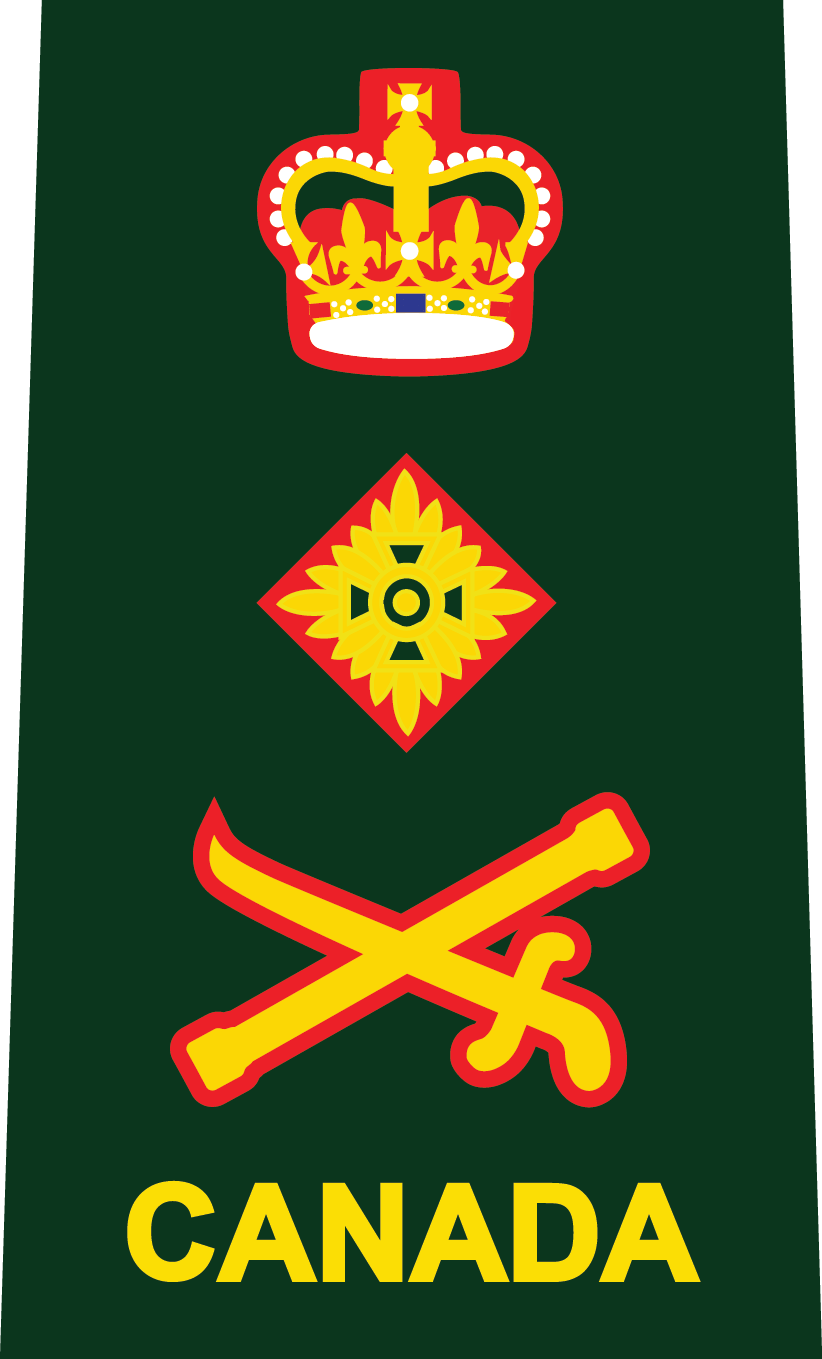
Uniform shirts (insignia used 2013–2016)
Air Force uniform variations

Dress uniform tunic - sleeve

CADPAT uniform

== See also ==
- Canadian Forces ranks and insignia
