= Jean Jacques Paradis =

- Born: 7 November 1928; Montreal, Quebec, Canada
- Died: 31 August 2007 (aged 78)
- Military career
- Allegiance: Canada
- Branch: Canadian Army/Canadian Forces
- Rank: Lieutenant General
- Commands: Commander, Mobile Command
- Awards: Commander of the Order of Military Merit; Canadian Forces' Decoration

Lieutenant General Jean Jacques Paradis CMM, CD (7 November 1928 – 31 August 2007) was the Commander, Mobile Command of the Canadian Forces.

== Military career ==
Educated at the Collège Jean-de-Brébeuf and the Université de Montréal, Paradis was commissioned the Royal 22^{e} Régiment in 1950. He served in Korea and Germany and then became commanding officer of the 3^{e} Bataillon in 1966.

He was made a director at the Canadian Army Staff College in 1968 and appointed commander of the 5 Canadian Mechanized Brigade Group at Valcartier in 1972. He became chief of personnel in 1975 and commander, Mobile Command in 1977.

In retirement he became overseas marketing director at Industries Valcartier, a munitions business, and a director of The Arches Foundation of Quebec, an organisation supporting the development of L'Arche communities in Quebec.

He died after a long illness on 31 August 2007.

Military offices
Preceded by Jacques Chouinard	Commander, Mobile Command; 1977–1981	Succeeded by Charles H. Belzile
