= Michael Jeffery (disambiguation) =

Michael Jeffery (1937–2020) was a governor-general of Australia.

Michael or Mike Jeffery may also refer to:

- Michael Jeffery (music manager) (1933–1973), English music business manager
- Mike Jeffery, Canadian Army general
- Michael "Mick" Jeffery, guitarist for Australian band Aversions Crown

== See also ==
- Michael Jeffrey (born 1971), professional football player
- Mike Jeffries (disambiguation)
