= Michel-Henri St-Louis =

Canadian general

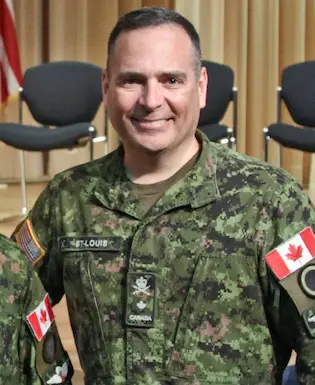
- St-Louis in 2019
- Military career
- Allegiance: Canada
- Branch: Canadian Army
- Service years: 1992–present
- Rank: Major-general
- Commands: Acting Commander of the Canadian Army and Chief of the Army Staff; Canadian Army Doctrine and Training Centre; Joint Task Force IMPACT
- Awards: Order of Military Merit; Meritorious Service Cross; Meritorious Service Medal; Canadian Forces' Decoration

Michel-Henri St-Louis OMM MSC MSM CD is a Canadian Forces officer who holds the rank of major general in the Canadian Army. St-Louis was the acting Commander of the Canadian Army and Chief of the Army Staff in 2021.

== Background ==
St-Louis served as an infantry officer from the Royal 22e Régiment since 1992. He has deployed on missions to Bosnia, Croatia, Afghanistan and the Middle East, and served as Deputy Commanding General for Operations of the U.S. Army's I Corps at Joint Base Lewis-McChord, and as Commander of Joint Task Force Impact. He holds three master's degrees focused on war, defence and strategy has also served as Commander of the Canadian Army Doctrine and Training Centre since August 2020.

=== Commander of the Canadian Army ===
St-Louis succeeded Major General Derek A. Macaulay as acting Commander of the Canadian Army on April 19, 2021. He assumed the position in an interim capacity while Lieutenant General Wayne Erye acts as Chief of the Defence Staff. St-Louis was subsequently succeeded by Lieutenant General Jocelyn Paul.

=== Military Attaché ===
On July 13, 2022, St-Louis was appointed to serve as the Defence Attaché to the United States, succeeding Captain William Quinn.

Military offices
Preceded by Wayne Eyre	Commander of the Canadian Army; 2021–2022	Succeeded by Jocelyn Paul
