= Rick Hillier =

Retired Canadian Forces officer

General Rick Hillier OC CMM ONL MSC CD
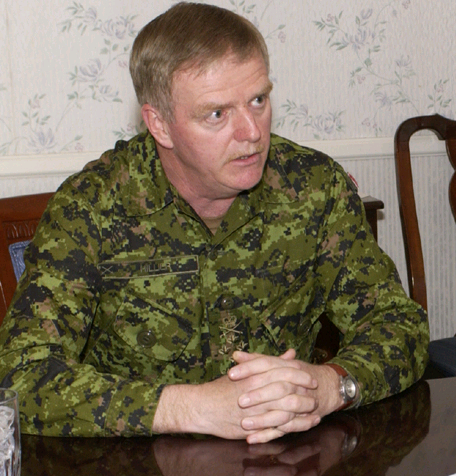
- General Hillier in 2005

Chief of the Defence Staff
- In office February 4, 2005 – July 1, 2008
- Preceded by: Ray Henault
- Succeeded by: Walter Natynczyk

Chief of the Land Staff
- In office May 30, 2003 – February 4, 2005
- Preceded by: Mike Jeffery
- Succeeded by: Marc Caron

Chair of the Ontario COVID-19 Vaccine Distribution Task Force
- In office November 23, 2020 – March 31, 2021
- Premier: Doug Ford
- Preceded by: Office established
- Succeeded by: Homer Tien

Chancellor of the Memorial University of Newfoundland
- In office July 3, 2008 – 2012
- Preceded by: John Crosbie
- Succeeded by: Susan Knight

Personal details
- Born: 1955 (age 70–71) Campbellton, Newfoundland, Canada
- Education: Memorial University of Newfoundland (BSc)
- Occupation: Military officer, public speaker

Military service
- Allegiance: Canada
- Branch/service: Land Force Command
- Years of service: 1973–2008
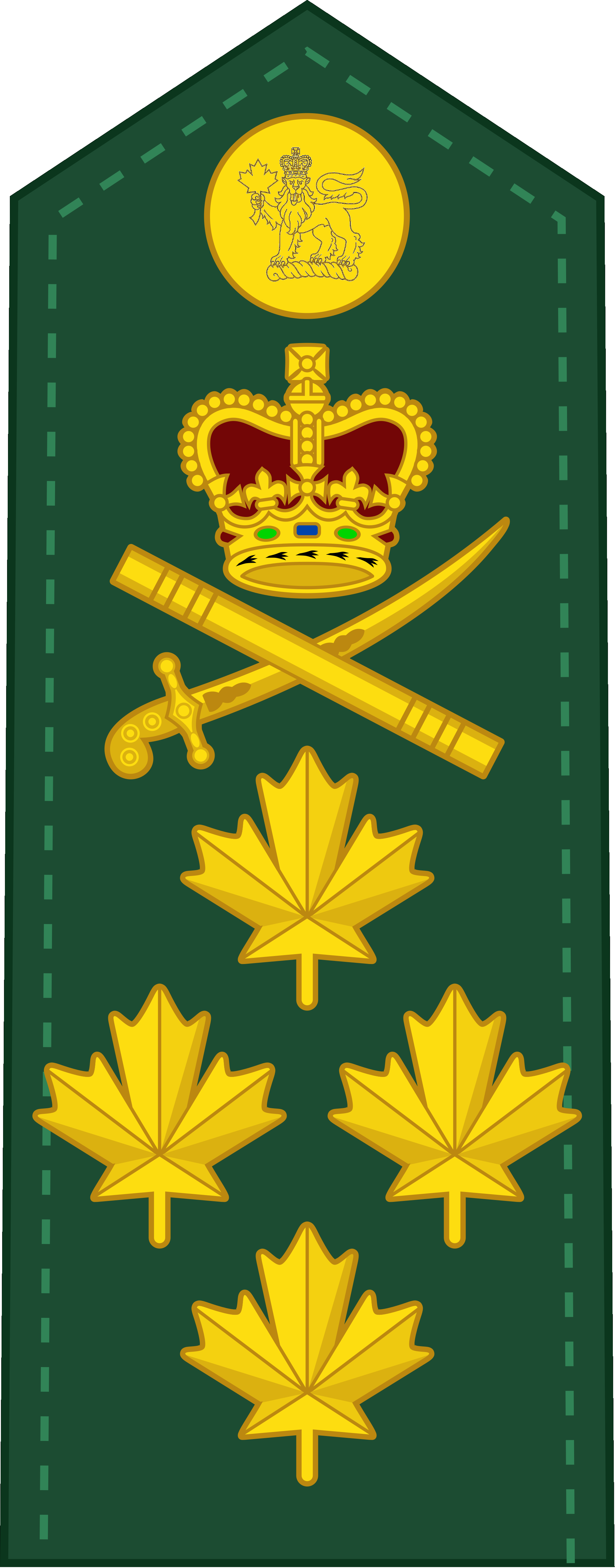
- Rank: General
- Commands: Multi-National Division (South-West), ISAF, Chief of the Land Staff, Chief of the Defence Staff
- Battles/wars: War in Afghanistan
- Awards: Commander of the Order of Military Merit; Meritorious Service Cross; Canadian Forces' Decoration

Rick J. Hillier (born June 30, 1955) is a retired Canadian Forces general, who served as the chief of the Defence Staff (CDS) from 4 February 2005 to 1 July 2008. He previously served as the chief of the Land Staff from 30 May 2003 until his promotion to CDS.

From 23 November 2020 to 31 March 2021, Hillier oversaw the province of Ontario's vaccination task-force in response to the COVID-19 pandemic in Ontario.

== Early life and education ==
Born in 1955 to Jack and Myrtle Hillier in Campbellton, Notre Dame Bay, Newfoundland, he was the fourth of six children and the only boy. He attended Greenwood High School and graduated in June 1972.

Hillier intended to join the military early, at 16. After receiving his father's permission, Hillier submitted his application to join the Canadian Forces in Spring 1972. He initially wanted to be a fighter pilot, but failed the medical examination. He then applied to join the Canadian Forces as an officer cadet at the Royal Military College of Canada but was rejected. At a similar time, he applied to and was accepted by Memorial University of Newfoundland and the Royal Canadian Mounted Police. Hillier chose to attend Memorial University, studying biology. While at Memorial University, his application to become an officer cadet was accepted; however, Hillier chose to continue studying in Newfoundland as part of the Regular Officer Training Program.

While studying, he met his wife, Joyce; they were married in Lower Island, Conception Bay, Newfoundland.

== Early military career ==
In January 1998, as commander of 2 Canadian Mechanized Brigade Group, he led Operation Recuperation, the Canadian Forces' intervention in the paralyzing ice storm in Ontario, Quebec and New Brunswick. He went on to command the Multi-National Division (South-West) in Bosnia-Herzegovina.

He was named chief of the land staff, commanding Land Force Command, on May 30, 2003. He is noted for his public calls for increased resources for the Canadian Forces. In 2003, when he was appointed chief of the land staff, he said, "Any commander who would stand up here and say that we didn't need more soldiers should be tarred and feathered and rode out of town on a rail." After serving as chief of the land staff and before being appointed chief of the defence staff, he commanded the NATO ISAF in Afghanistan from February 9 to August 12, 2004.

== Chief of the Defence Staff ==
On February 4, 2005, Hillier became chief of the defence staff. At the change-of-command ceremony he repeated his call, more broadly, for increased military funding. "In this country, we could probably not give enough resources to the men and women to do all the things that we ask them to do," he said, with Prime Minister Paul Martin and Minister of National Defence Bill Graham looking on. "But we can give them too little, and that is what we are now doing. Remember them in your budgets." Upon his appointment, he became the highest-ranking military officer from Newfoundland and Labrador.

=== Uncle Rick ===
Hillier was a popular CDS. When speaking to troops on parade, he would frequently call them into a hollow circle around him rather than delivering a generic speech from a podium while they stood to attention. At briefings, Hillier asked every person what they thought about a situation at hand – regardless of their rank, language, or nationality.

=== Media criticism ===
Hillier was known for his plain-spoken language and focus on frontline capabilities. Early in his term as CDS, he drew criticism from the media when he called terrorists "detestable murderers and scumbags". He went further, saying "we're not the public service of Canada. We're not just another department. We are the Canadian Forces, and our job is to be able to kill people."

=== Resignation ===
On April 15, 2008, Hillier announced he would step down as CDS on July 1, 2008.

Hillier was subsequently appointed as chancellor of Memorial University of Newfoundland, effective July 3, 2008.

== Post-military ==
=== Public speaking ===
Upon retirement in 2008, Hillier joined the public speaking arena and developed his own speaking agency.

Working with a number of large corporate clients, Hillier's speaking detailed the experiences of troops under his command, emphasizing the theme of "leadership in tough times."

=== Project Hero ===
In 2009, Hillier co-founded Project Hero, a scholarship program for the children of Canadian Forces personnel killed while on active military duty. The Children of Deceased Veterans – Education Assistance Act verification is used to verify Project Hero eligibility. The process is administered by Veterans Affairs Canada.

=== Academic ===
On August 14, 2008, Telus announced that Hillier was appointed as chair of Telus Atlantic Canada Community Board. Hillier said, “Telus is a company that gets stuff done both in business and in the community – I like that. They are entrusting their philanthropic efforts in Atlantic Canada to people who live and work here. I'm excited about the opportunity to help Telus engage with the Atlantic Canada communities that are so very important to me.”

=== TD Bank ===
Hillier announced on September 3, 2008 that he will be working at an Ottawa office for the TD Bank to support initiatives that enhance the client and customer experience and to assist the bank's ongoing leadership development and training activities.

=== Provincial Aerospace ===
On June 16, 2009, while attending the 48th International Paris Air Show, Provincial Aerospace announced that Hillier will join the company's advisory board.

=== Politics ===
Since his retirement from the military, Hillier's name has been mentioned as a leadership candidate for several political parties. Hillier's name was mentioned by political pundits as a possible successor to Prime Minister Stephen Harper, during Harper's minority Conservative government. When Newfoundland and Labrador Premier Danny Williams retired from politics in 2010, Hillier's name was brought up as a possible successor to the Progressive Conservative premier. In August 2011, his name was brought up once again as a potential Liberal leader in his home province, when leader Yvonne Jones resigned. Hillier has stated on several occasions however that he has no interest in politics.

=== COVID-19 vaccine task-force for Ontario ===
In November 2020, Hillier was appointed as the chair of the vaccine distribution taskforce for Ontario by Premier Doug Ford in response to the COVID-19 pandemic in Ontario. Hillier leads the task-force in its rollout and distribution of COVID-19 vaccines approved by Health Canada, distributed federally and administered by the province. After the Christmas and holiday season in December, 2020, Hillier formally apologized to Ontarians for halting vaccine administration for a number of days, calling the move a "mistake". Hillier left the position March 31, 2021. He was replaced with Homer Tien as operation lead.

== Honours ==
In 2011, he was made an officer of the Order of Canada "for his service to our nation, which has inspired pride in our Canadian Forces". In December 2013, it was announced that Hillier would be appointed to the Order of Newfoundland and Labrador by Lieutenant Governor Frank Fagan during a ceremony in February 2014.

Ribbon bars of General (Ret'd) RJ Hillier
OC, CMM, ONL, MSC, CD

Ribbon	Description	Notes
	Order of Canada (OC)	Officer; 4 October 2012
	Order of Military Merit (CMM)	Commander; 1 September 2001
	Order of St John (O.StJ)	Officer; 2005
	Order of Newfoundland and Labrador (ONL)	Member; 2013
	Meritorious Service Cross (MSC)	24 September 2001
	General Campaign Star	South West Asia
	Special Service Medal	
	Canadian Peacekeeping Service Medal	30 Days Service on a United Nations or International Peacekeeping Mission
	United Nations Medal	90 Days Service on Peacekeeping Mission; Croatia and Bosnia and Herzegovina; during the Yugoslav Wars
	NATO Medal	With "ISAF" Clasp; 30 Days Service on Nato Mission in Afghanistan
	125th Anniversary of the Confederation of Canada Medal	1992
	Queen Elizabeth II Golden Jubilee Medal	2002; Canadian Version of this Medal
	Queen Elizabeth II Diamond Jubilee Medal	2012; Canadian Version of this Medal
	Canadian Forces' Decoration (CD)	With 2 Clasps; 32 Years Service in the Canadian Forces
	Commemorative Medal for the Centennial of Saskatchewan	27 May 2005
	Alberta Centennial Medal	24 March 2005
	Order of Orange-Nassau	Commander; 25 October 2008; Kingdom of the Netherlands
	Legion of Merit	Officer; 24 February 2001; United States of America
	Queen's Commendation for Valuable Service	17 August 2002; United Kingdom

=== Scholastic ===
University degrees

Location	Date	School	Degree
Newfoundland and Labrador	1975	Memorial University of Newfoundland	Bachelor of Science (B.Sc.)

Chancellor, visitor, governor, rector and fellowships

Location	Date	School	Position
Newfoundland and Labrador	2008–2012	Memorial University of Newfoundland	Chancellor

Honorary degrees

Location	Date	School	Degree	Gave Commencement Address
Ontario	13 November 2009	Royal Military College of Canada	Doctor of Military Science (D.Sc.Mil)	
Alberta	11 December 2010	University of Calgary	Doctorate	
Newfoundland and Labrador	29 May 2013	Memorial University of Newfoundland	Doctor of Laws (LL.D)	

== Awards ==
Location	Date	Institution	Award
Ontario	2008	Gordon S. Lang School of Business and Economics at the University of Guelph	Lincoln Alexander Outstanding Leader Award

== Works ==
- Hillier, Rick (2010) A Soldier First: Bullets, Bureaucrats and the Politics of War; hardcover, 552 pages; published by HarperCollins Publishers Ltd; ISBN 978-1554684915.
- Hillier, Rick (2010) Leadership: 50 Points of Wisdom for Today's Leaders; hardcover, 272 pages; published by HarperCollins Publishers Ltd; ISBN 978-1554684939.

== Sources ==
- Hillier, Rick (2010). A Soldier First: Bullets, Bureaucrats and the Politics of War. Toronto: HarperCollins Publishers Ltd. ISBN 978-1-55468-491-5.

Military offices
Preceded by Robin Brims	Commander Multi-National Division (South-West), Bosnia; 2000–2001	Succeeded by Tony van Diepenbrugge
Preceded by Mike Jeffery	Chief of the Land Staff; 2003–2005	Succeeded by Marc Caron
Preceded by Götz Gliemeroth	Commander, International Security Assistance Force; February 2004 – August 2004	Succeeded by Jean-Louis Py
Preceded by R. R. J. Henault	Chief of the Defence Staff; 2005–2008	Succeeded by W. J. Natynczyk
Academic offices
Preceded by John Crosbie	Chancellor of Memorial University of Newfoundland; 2008–2012	Succeeded by Susan Knight
