= Jocelyn Paul =

Canadian Forces officer

- Born: Wendake, Quebec
- Alma mater: Université du Québec à Chicoutimi (BA, 1988); Université de Montréal (MA, 1991)
- Military career
- Allegiance: Canada
- Branch: Canadian Army
- Service years: 1988–2024
- Rank: Lieutenant-General
- Commands: Commander of the Canadian Army and Chief of the Army Staff; 4th Canadian Division; Canadian Manoeuvre Training Centre; Counter-Improvised Explosive Device Task Force; 2nd Battalion, Royal 22nd Regiment
- Conflicts: War in Afghanistan
- Awards: Commander of the Order of Military Merit; Meritorious Service Cross; Canadian Forces' Decoration; Officer of the Legion of Merit (United States)

Lieutenant-General Jocelyn Paul, CMM, MSC, CD is a senior Canadian Forces officer who served as Commander of the Canadian Army and Chief of the Army Staff from June 16, 2022 until July 12, 2024.

== Early life and education ==
Paul was born and raised in Wendake, a First Nations community in Quebec. He is a member of the Huron-Wendat.

Paul attended the Université du Québec à Chicoutimi, where he studied history and earned a bachelor's degree in 1988. He then went on to complete a master's degree in anthropology at the Université de Montréal in 1991.

== Military career ==
Paul joined the reserve force in 1988 as an infantry officer with the Régiment du Saguenay and Régiment de Maisonneuve. He transferred to the regular force in 1991 as part of the Royal 22e Régiment. He was promoted to lieutenant-general in 2021, when he was appointed Deputy Commander Allied Joint Forces Command Naples.

On April 21, 2022, the Department of National Defence announced that Paul had been selected to become the next commander of the Canadian Army. He took over the role on June 16, 2022. He is the first and only Indigenous person to serve in this position.

On July 12, 2024, Paul retired from the Canadian Army, passing his position as the Commander of the Canadian Army and Chief of the Army Staff to Michael Wright.

Military offices
Preceded by Michel-Henri St-Louis	Commander of the Canadian Army; 2022–2024	Succeeded by Michael Wright
