= Walter Natynczyk =

Canadian general

General Walter Natynczyk OC CMM MSC CD
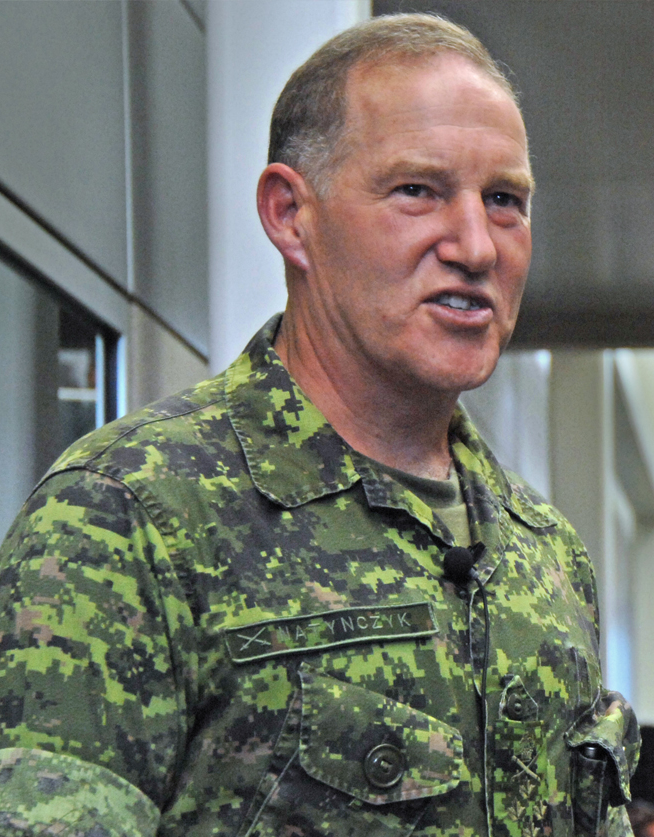
- Natynczyk in July 2008

9th Deputy Minister of Veterans Affairs
- In office November 3, 2014 – May 21, 2021
- Minister: Julian Fantino; Erin O'Toole; Kent Hehr; Seamus O'Regan; Harjit Sajjan (acting); Lawrence MacAulay
- Preceded by: Mary Chaput

President of the Canadian Space Agency
- In office August 6, 2013 – November 3, 2014
- Minister: James Moore
- Preceded by: Steve MacLean; Gilles Leclerc (acting)
- Succeeded by: Luc Brûlé (interim)

16th Chief of the Defence Staff
- In office 2008–2012
- Minister: Peter MacKay
- Preceded by: Rick Hillier
- Succeeded by: Thomas J. Lawson

20th Vice Chief of the Defence Staff
- In office 2006–2008
- Commander: Rick Hillier
- Preceded by: Ronald Buck
- Succeeded by: Denis Rouleau

Personal details
- Born: Walter John Natynczyk; October 29, 1957 (age 69) Winnipeg, Manitoba, Canada
- Education: Royal Roads Military College; Collège militaire royal de Saint-Jean; United States Army War College
- Awards: Order of Canada; Commander of the Order of Military Merit; Meritorious Service Cross; Canadian Forces' Decoration; Commander of the Legion of Honour (France); Commander Legion of Merit, 2012 (United States); Commander's Cross of the Order of Merit of the Republic of Poland, 2013

Military service
- Allegiance: Canada
- Branch/service: Canadian Army
- Years of service: 1975–2012
- Rank: General
- Battles/wars: War in Afghanistan; Iraq War; Bosnian War

Walter John Natynczyk OC CMM MSC CD (/nəˈtɪntʃɪk/ nə-TIN-chik; born October 29, 1957) is a Canadian public servant and retired Canadian Army general who has served as deputy minister of Veterans Affairs from 2014 to 2021. He was the president of the Canadian Space Agency from 2013 to 2014 and Chief of the Defence Staff of the Canadian Armed Forces from 2008 to 2012.

== Personal life ==
Natynczyk is married to Leslie. They have three children who, notably, each chose to serve in a different branch of the Canadian Armed Forces.

Both Polish-Canadian and German-Canadian, Natynczyk was born to a family of European emigrants from war-ravaged Europe on October 29, 1957, in Winnipeg, Manitoba. His Polish father was a soldier in the Polish Army during World War II, and his mother was German. Natynczyk grew up with his two sisters. He worked as a Winnipeg Free Press paperboy and a hamburger flipper at a fast food establishment. Before joining the regular Canadian Army, Natynczyk spent five years in the Royal Canadian Air Cadets.

== Military career ==
Natynczyk joined the Canadian Forces in August 1975. He attended Royal Roads Military College and Collège militaire royal de Saint-Jean, graduating in 1979 with a degree in Business Administration. His formative years were spent on NATO duty in West Germany with The Royal Canadian Dragoons in troop command and staff appointments.

In 1983, Natynczyk assumed duties as a Squadron Commander at the Royal Military College of Canada in Kingston, Ontario. In 1986, he commenced a five-year regimental tour in Petawawa, serving in several staff and squadron command appointments; this tour included six months of UN peacekeeping duties in Cyprus. On completion of Canadian Forces Command and Staff College, he served on the Army Staff in Saint-Hubert, Quebec.

In May 1994, Natynczyk embarked upon a year-long tour with the United Nations in the former Yugoslavia as Sector South-West Chief of Operations in Bosnia and Herzegovina within HQ 7 (UK) Armoured Brigade, then as the Chief of Land Operations, UNPROFOR HQ in Zagreb, Croatia. In June 1995, Natynczyk was assigned to the Vice Chief of the Defence Staff within National Defence HQ in Ottawa, Ontario. He then commanded his regiment for two years, leading the Dragoons during domestic operations in the Ottawa region during the 1998 ice storm. Natynczyk returned to Bosnia in 1998 as the Canadian Contingent Commander. On his return to Ottawa in March 1999, he was appointed J3 Plans and Operations during the period of deployments to Kosovo, Bosnia, East Timor and Eritrea.

Natynczyk attended the U.S. Army War College, and was subsequently appointed Deputy Commanding General, III Corps and Fort Hood. In January 2004, he deployed with III Corps to Baghdad, Iraq, serving first as the deputy director of Strategy, Policy and Plans, and subsequently as the Deputy Commanding General of the Multi-National Corps – Iraq during Operation Iraqi Freedom. Natynczyk led the Corps' 35,000 soldiers, consisting of 10 separate brigades, stationed throughout the Iraq Theatre of Operations. He was later awarded the Meritorious Service Cross specifically for his combat efforts in Operation Iraqi Freedom January 2004 to January 2005.

Upon his return to Canada, he assumed command of the Land Force Doctrine and Training System. He was subsequently appointed Chief of Transformation, where he was responsible for implementation of the force restructuring and the enabling processes and policies.

Natynczyk was promoted to lieutenant general (LGen), and assumed the responsibilities of the Vice Chief of Defence Staff on June 28, 2006.

=== Chief of the Defence Staff ===
On June 6, 2008, prime minister Stephen Harper appointed Natynczyk as the next Chief of the Defence Staff (CDS), replacing retiring general Rick Hillier. Natynczyk was promoted to general, and installed as CDS on July 2, 2008. General Natynczyk transferred his appointment at a change of command ceremony in 2012.

On February 16, 2012, in Washington, the U.S. Chairman of the Joint Chiefs of Staff, general Martin Dempsey, awarded the Legion of Merit (Degree of Commander) to Natynczyk.

=== Retirement from the Canadian Forces ===
Natynczyk retired from the Canadian Armed Forces in December 2012 to take on public service, after transferring control of the defence staff to his successor, RCAF General Thomas Lawson, just 2 months earlier.

== Post-military career ==
On August 6, 2013, he was appointed president of the Canadian Space Agency by prime minister Stephen Harper. He was appointed as the 9th deputy minister of Veterans Affairs Canada, effective November 3, 2014, during the Harper ministry and continued in his role under Justin Trudeau.

Natynczyk retired from public service in 2021, receiving accolades from prime minister Justin Trudeau for his lifetime dedication and service to Canadians. He was appointed Colonel Commandant of the Royal Canadian Armoured Corps in August 2021, and retired from this role in June 2024.

In December 2024, he was appointed as an Officer of the Order of Canada by governor general Mary Simon. He lives in Hartington, Ontario.

== Honours and decorations ==

Ribbon	Description	Notes
	Order of Canada	Degree of Officer; Awarded in 2026
	Order of Military Merit (CMM)	
	Meritorious Service Cross (MSC)	
	General Campaign Star	Expedition
	Special Service Medal	
	Canadian Peacekeeping Service Medal	
	UN Mission in Cyprus	
	UN Protection Force (Yugoslavia)	
	NATO Medal for Yugoslavia	
	Queen Elizabeth II's Diamond Jubilee Medal	
	Canadian Forces' Decoration (CD)	2 Clasps; 32 years of service in the Canadian Forces
	Legion d'Honneur	Degree of Commander
	Legion of Merit	Degree of Officer; From United States of America; Awarded in 2012
	Order of Merit of the Republic of Poland	Degree of Commander; Awarded in 2013

Military offices
Preceded by Ronald Buck	Vice Chief of the Defence Staff; 2006–2008	Succeeded by Denis Rouleau
Preceded by Rick Hillier	Chief of the Defence Staff; 2008–2012	Succeeded by Thomas J. Lawson
