= Bruce MacLean =

Canadian Navy admiral

VAdm Bruce MacLean CMM CD
- Allegiance: Canada
- Branch: Canadian Forces
- Service years: 1970–2006
- Rank: Vice-Admiral
- Commands: HMCS Okanagan; HMAS Oxley; HMAS Orion; HMCS Provider; Maritime Forces Atlantic
- Awards: Commander of the Order of Military Merit; Canadian Forces' Decoration

Vice-Admiral M. Bruce MacLean CMM CD is a retired officer of the Canadian Forces. He was Chief of the Maritime Staff from 2004 to 2006.

== Career ==
Educated at Dalhousie University, MacLean joined the Canadian Forces in 1970. He became Commanding Officer of the submarine HMCS Okanagan in 1982. He went on to be Director Maritime Force Development in the Directorate of Submarine Requirements in 1986, Commanding Officer of the supply ship HMCS Provider in 1992 and Chief of Staff to the Commander Maritime Forces Pacific in 1994. He was next appointed Director General Maritime Development in the National Defence Headquarters in 1995, Director General International Security Policy at National Defence Headquarters in 1998 and Commander of Maritime Forces Atlantic in 2000. His final posts were as Canadian Military Representative to the NATO Military Committee in August 2002 and Chief of the Maritime Staff in 2004 before retiring in 2006.

== Awards and decorations ==
MacLean's personal awards and decorations include the following:

Ribbon	Description	Notes
	Order of Military Merit (CMM)	Appointed Commander (CMM) on 3 October 2001; Appointed Officer (OMM) on 18 November 1992
	Special Service Medal	with NATO-OTAN Clasp
	Queen Elizabeth II Golden Jubilee Medal	Decoration awarded in 2002; Canadian version
	Canadian Forces' Decoration (CD)	with two Clasp for 32 years of service

- He was a qualified Submariner and as such wore the Canadian Forces Submariner Dolphins

Military offices
Preceded by Ronald Buck	Chief of the Maritime Staff; 2004–2006	Succeeded by Drew Robertson
