= Gord Reay =

Canadian general (1943–2000)

- Born: 30 May 1943; Royston, United Kingdom
- Died: 21 December 2000 (aged 57); Zagreb, Croatia
- Military career
- Allegiance: Canada
- Branch: Canadian Forces
- Rank: Lieutenant General
- Commands: Chief of the Land Staff
- Awards: Commander of the Order of Military Merit; Member of the Order of the British Empire; Canadian Forces' Decoration

Lieutenant General Gordon Reay CMM MBE CD (30 May 1943 – 21 December 2000) was the Chief of the Land Staff of the Canadian Forces.

== Military career ==
Educated at High School in Montreal, Reay graduated from the Royal Military College of Canada in 1965. He was commissioned into the 2nd Battalion of Princess Patricia's Canadian Light Infantry. He served in both Edmonton and Germany.

In 1969 he joined the staff at Mobile Command Headquarters at Saint-Hubert, Quebec and in 1971 he attended the Canadian Land Force Command and Staff College. He then went on an operational tour with the United Nations Peacekeeping Force in Cyprus. In 1975 he joined 1st British Corps in Bielefeld and in 1977 he became a senior staff officer with 1 Canadian Mechanized Brigade Group.

He was appointed commanding officer of 1st Battalion Princess Patricia's Canadian Light Infantry in 1979. He went on to become director of military manpower distribution at National Defence Headquarters in 1981 and, as a brigadier, he became special policy assistant to the assistant deputy minister (personnel) there in 1983. In 1987 he was made commander of 1 Canadian Mechanized Brigade Group and in 1989 he was promoted to major-general and appointed chief of land doctrine and operations. In 1991 he was appointed deputy commander of Land Force Command and in 1993 he became chief of the land staff.

In retirement, he was killed in a road accident in December 2000 while on a humanitarian mission in Croatia.

== Family ==
He was married and had one son.

Military offices
Preceded by Jim Gervais (as Commander, Mobile Command)	Chief of the Land Staff; 1993–1996	Succeeded by Maurice Baril
