= Michael Wright (Canadian Army officer) =

Canadian Forces officer

- Military career
- Allegiance: Canada
- Branch: Canadian Army
- Service years: 1990–present
- Rank: Lieutenant-General
- Commands: Commander of the Canadian Army and Chief of the Army Staff; Canadian Forces Intelligence Command; 2 Canadian Mechanized Brigade Group
- Conflicts: War in Afghanistan
- Awards: Commander of the Order of Military Merit; Medal of Military Valour; Meritorious Service Medal; Canadian Forces' Decoration

Lieutenant-General Michael Charles Wright, CMM, MMV, MSM, CD is a senior Canadian Forces officer who has served as commander of the Canadian Army and Chief of the Army Staff since July 2024.

== Military career ==
Wright joined the Canadian Army in 1990. After serving as commanding officer of a battalion of Princess Patricia's Canadian Light Infantry, he became commander of 2 Canadian Mechanized Brigade Group in 2017, commander of Canadian Forces Intelligence Command in June 2021 and commander of the Canadian Army and Chief of the Army Staff in July 2024.

== Honours and decorations ==
Honours and decorations include:

Ribbon	Description	Notes
	Order of Military Merit (CMM)	
	Medal of Military Valour (MMV)	MMV Citation
	Meritorious Service Medal (MSM)	silver maple leaf indicates a second award
	General Campaign Star - South-West Asia	With Rotation Bar
	General Campaign Star - Expedition	
	General Service Medal - Expedition	With gold Maple leaf to indicate at least 390 days of service
	Operational Service Medal - Expedition	
	Canadian Peacekeeping Service Medal	
	NATO Medal for Former Yugoslavia	With the numeral 2 indicating at least 360 days of service
	Queen Elizabeth II's Diamond Jubilee Medal	
	Canadian Forces' Decoration (CD)	2 Clasps 32 years of service in the Canadian Forces
	Meritorious Service Medal (United States)	

Military offices
Preceded by Jocelyn Paul	Commander of the Canadian Army; 2024–present	Incumbent
