= Jim Fox (Canadian Army officer) =

Canadian military officer

- Military career
- Allegiance: Canada
- Branch: Canadian Army/Canadian Forces
- Rank: Lieutenant General
- Commands: Mobile Command; 4 Canadian Mechanized Brigade Group; Lord Strathcona's Horse
- Conflicts: United Nations Peacekeeping Force in Cyprus
- Awards: Commander of the Order of Military Merit; Canadian Forces' Decoration

Lieutenant General James Arthur Fox, CMM, CD, is a retired Canadian military officer who served as Commander, Mobile Command of the Canadian Forces from 1986 to 1989.

== Military career ==
Fox joined the Royal Canadian Armoured Corps and went on to become commanding officer of Lord Strathcona's Horse, taking his regiment on an operational tour with the United Nations Peacekeeping Force in Cyprus in 1972.

Fox was appointed Commander, Mobile Command in 1986. In that role, he executed Rendezvous 89, a major exercise involving 15,000 military personnel and more than 5,000 vehicles and aircraft from 40 different units across Canada.

In retirement, he became colonel of Lord Strathcona's Horse.

Military offices
Preceded by Charles H. Belzile	Commander, Mobile Command; 1986–1989	Succeeded by Kent Foster
