= Fort Frontenac Library =

Canadian Army research library

Coordinates: 44°14′00″N 76°28′43″W

Fort Frontenac Library, Kingston, Ontario, Canada
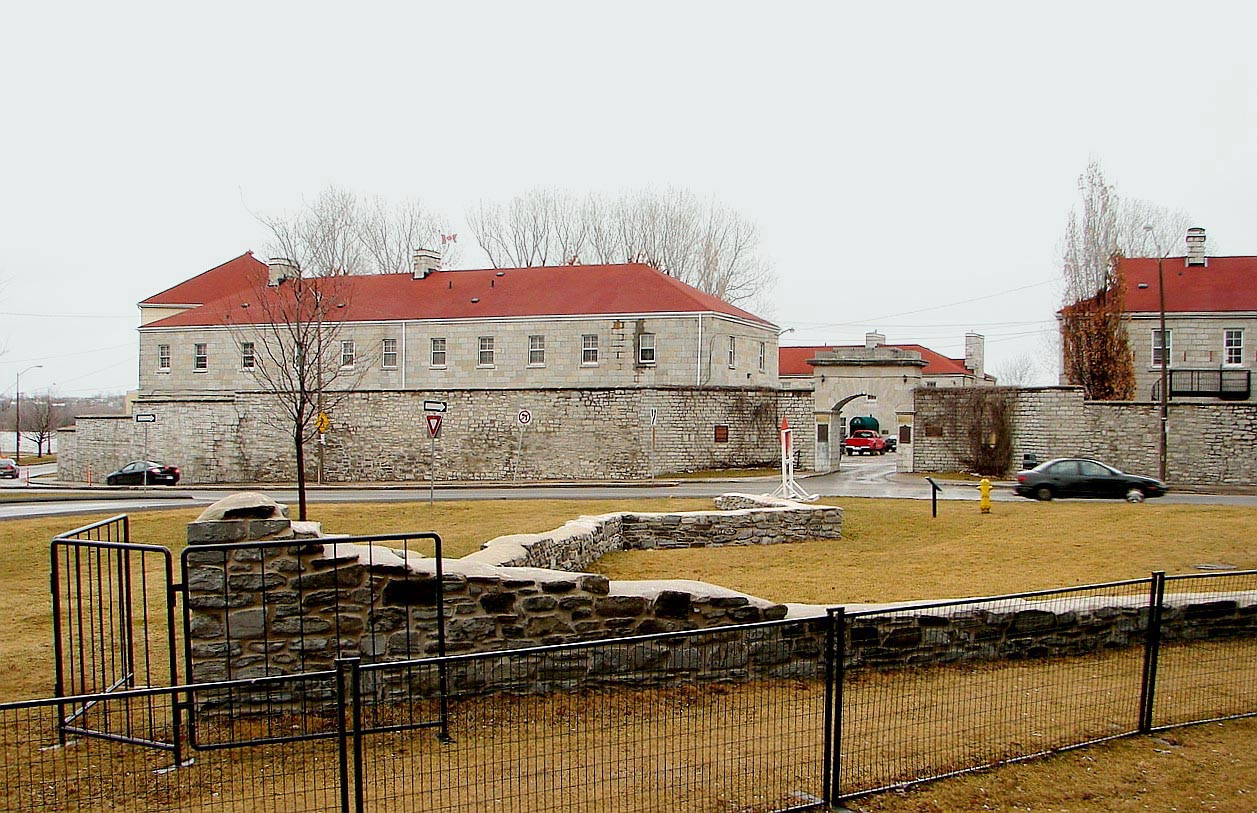
- Type: main research library for the Canadian Army
- Established: 1947 (on grounds of the Royal Military College of Canada currently on the grounds of Fort Frontenac, Canadian Forces Base Kingston.

Collection
- Items collected: volumes, monographs, documents, and artifacts dedicated to the study of conflict and land warfare in the Canadian context
- Size: 100,000 items; 90000 volumes
- Criteria for collection: assists the army's advanced officer development programs as well as its research and development communities across the country

Access and use
- Circulation: 12000 items per year

Other information
- Director: Chief Librarian is Kristen Coulas
- Website: [http://]

The Fort Frontenac Library, located within the Canadian Land Forces Command and Staff College, Fort Frontenac, Kingston, Ontario, is the main research library for the Canadian Army. Established in 1947 this library is one of the oldest collections of volumes, monographs, documents, and artifacts dedicated to the study of conflict and land warfare in the Canadian context. The Fort Frontenac Library assists the army's advanced officer development programs as well as its research and development communities across the country.

== Origins ==
Created in 1947, the Canadian Army Staff College (CASC) library was designed to function separately from the Royal Military College of Canada Library, with which it was initially colocated on the college grounds. The CASC library was initially designed to serve the needs of the National Defence College (NDC), while the RMC library served the needs of cadets and faculty. The CASC library was headed by Lieutenant Colonel T.F. Gelley. In 1942, when the Canadian Junior War Staff Course was transferred from England to Canada the initial CASC collection consisted of some 300 books and reports which had been brought over from England. By 1947, the collection consisted of roughly 2100 volumes, which included academic books, technical material, doctrinal and training manuals, popular military texts, and even novels. These donations came from a wide variety of sources, including the Canadian Army overseas, the YMCA, the Royal Military College of Canada, as well as individual officers and soldiers.

In December 1947, the Canadian Army Staff College moved from the Royal Military College to current quarters on the grounds of Fort Frontenac. The CASC library transferred and renamed the Fort Frontenac Library. From that point, the library was designed to meet the research needs of the staff and students of both the National Defence College and the Canadian Army Staff College. The collection consists of books and reports in the fields of military science, international relations, government, politics, and economics.

== Expansion ==
Between 1950 and 1994 the library was expanded and evolved significantly. Its core collection grew to include a significant holding of volumes on politics, economics, strategic studies, international relations, and military history, a reflection of its association with the internationally focused NDC courses. As well, the collection benefited from several important donations from foreign students and Canadian Army officers. Its relationship with the NDC and the army staff courses allowed for the creation of unique collection focused on land forces and land warfare studies.

== Post Cold War era ==
The end of the Cold War saw a significant reorientation of the Canadian Forces, which affected all of its organizations including its education and training systems. Several legacy establishments were closed including the NDC, which graduated its last class in 1994. With this closure, the future of the Fort Frontenac Library became tenuous. Oversight and direction of the library initially returned to the Canadian Land Forces Command and Staff College, but in the late 1990s, its supervision was again transferred to the Land Forces Doctrine and Training System. Responsibility for the library moved again in 2003, this time to the Directorate of Army Doctrine.

== Afghanistan War ==
In light of the army's ongoing operations in Afghanistan and new orientation towards counterinsurgency, in 2006 the library received a new mandate to directly support research and development associated with ongoing army capability development. Under the supervision of the Directorate of Land Concepts and Designs (DLCD) with development and operations then overseen by Major Andrew Godefroy, the library refocused its efforts on the accession of both old and new volumes on land warfare, as well as the development of a number of special collections unique to the Canadian Army. In 2011-2012, direct oversight of the library transferred to Lieutenant Colonel Brad Boswell, with Mr. David Willis being confirmed as Chief Librarian.

== New mandate ==
Effective 1 April 2014, oversight of the Fort Frontenac Library was transferred from the Canadian Army Land Warfare Centre to the Canadian Army Command and Staff College. Under new direction, the library continues to support both army command and staff college courses as well as broader army operational research, experimentation, and capability development.

== See also ==
- Military history of Canada
- History of the Canadian Army
- Canadian Forces
