= Mike Jeffery =

Canadian general

- Born: London, United Kingdom
- Military career
- Allegiance: Canada
- Branch: Canadian Forces
- Rank: Lieutenant General
- Commands: Chief of the Land Staff
- Conflicts: Namibia
- Awards: Commander of the Order of Military Merit; Canadian Forces' Decoration

Lieutenant-General Michael Jeffery CMM CD was the Chief of the Land Staff of the Canadian Forces.

== Military career ==
After a short period as a soldier apprentice, Jeffery was commissioned into the Royal Regiment of Canadian Artillery in 1967, rising over his career to be the commanding officer of the Third Regiment Royal Canadian Horse Artillery.

In 1989 he was selected to be Canadian Contingent commander to the United Nations Transition Assistance Group (UNTAG) in Namibia. He was subsequently commandant of the Canadian Land Forces Command and Staff College and then commander of the 1st Canadian Infantry Division.

He served as chief of the land staff from August 2000 to May 2003. In that role he expressed concerns that the commitment of two six-month rotations of about 1,800 soldiers to Afghanistan meant about a third of the army's deployable forces were committed internationally. He retired from military service in the rank of lieutenant general in 2003.

In 2000, he was promoted in the Order of Military Merit to the grade of commander. In 2004 he was awarded an honorary doctorate degree from the Royal Military College of Canada. He is also a distinguished alumni at the Canadian Defence and Foreign Affairs Institute.

Military offices
Preceded by William Leach	Chief of the Land Staff; 2000–2003	Succeeded by Rick Hillier
