= Drew Robertson =

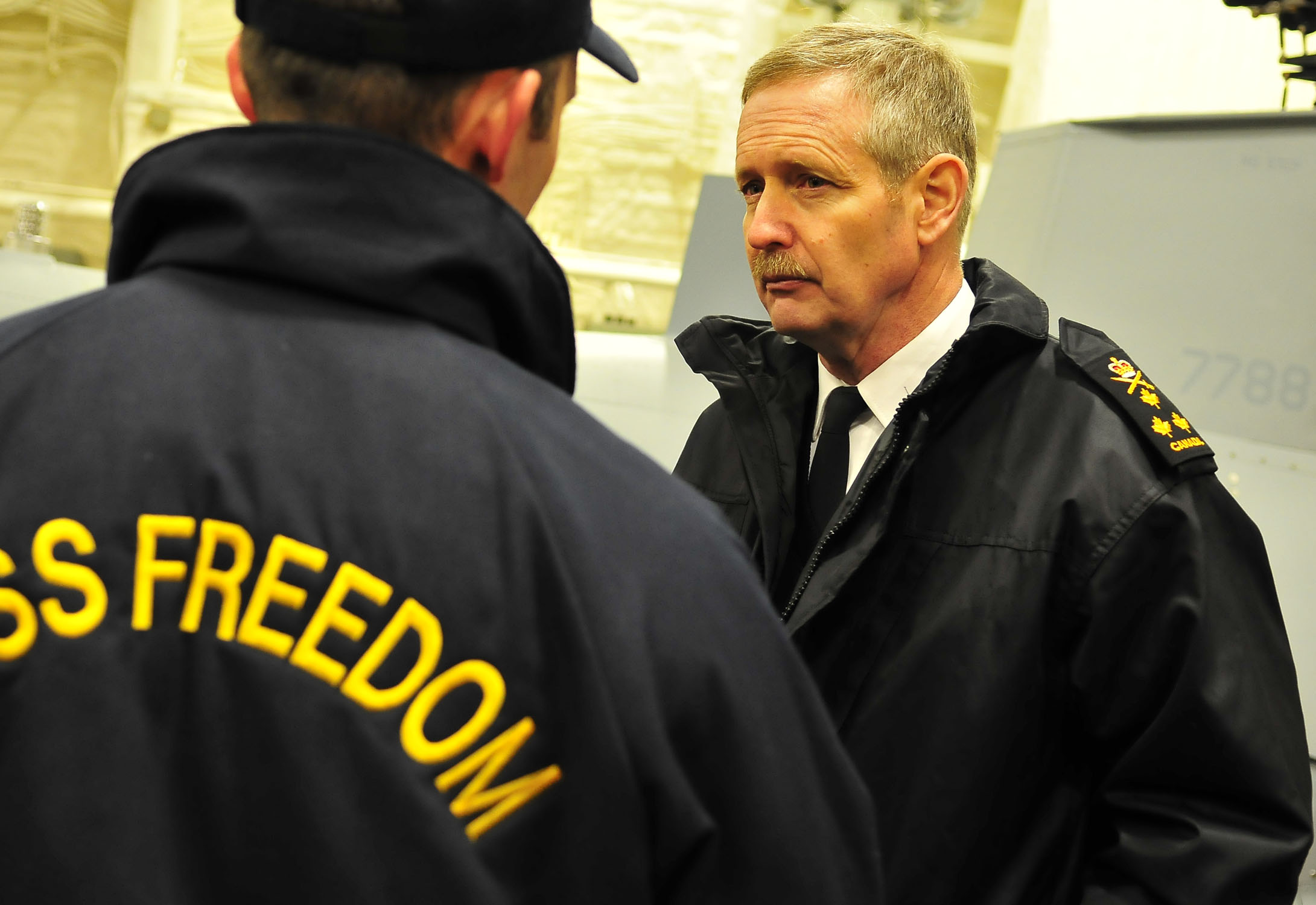
- VAdm Drew William Robertson
- Allegiance: Canada
- Branch: Canadian Forces
- Service years: 1973–2009
- Rank: Vice-Admiral
- Commands: HMCS Annapolis; HMCS Athabaskan; First Canadian Task Group
- Conflicts: War in Afghanistan
- Awards: Commander of the Order of Military Merit; Meritorious Service Medal; Canadian Forces' Decoration

Vice-Admiral Drew W. Robertson CMM, MSM, CD is a retired officer of the Canadian Forces. He was Chief of the Maritime Staff from 17 January 2006 to 22 June 2009.

== Career ==
Robertson joined the Canadian Forces in 1973. He became commander of the destroyer HMCS Annapolis in 1995 and of the destroyer HMCS Athabaskan in 1999 before commanding the First Canadian Task Group during the Operation Apollo anti-terrorism deployment in 2001. He went on to be Director General of international security policy at National Defence Headquarters in 2003 and Chief of the Maritime Staff in 2006 before retiring in 2009.

== Awards and decorations ==
Robertson's personal awards and decorations include the following:

Ribbon	Description	Notes
	Order of Military Merit (CMM)	Appointed Commander (CMM) on 21 September 2006; Appointed Officer (OMM) on 26 October 1999
	Order of St John	Appointed Member on 15 December 2006
	Meritorious Service Medal (MSM)	Decoration awarded on 23 November 2007; Military division
	South-West Asia Service Medal	with AFGHANISTAN Clasp
	Special Service Medal	with NATO-OTAN Clasp
	Canadian Forces' Decoration (CD)	with two Clasp for 32 years of service

Military offices
Preceded by Bruce MacLean	Chief of the Maritime Staff; 2006–2009	Succeeded by Dean McFadden
