= Gilles Turcot =

Canadian general (1917–2010)

- Born: 9 December 1917; Quebec City, Quebec, Canada
- Died: 15 December 2010 (aged 93) Magog, Quebec, Canada
- Allegiance: Canada
- Branch: Canadian Army/Canadian Forces
- Rank: Lieutenant General
- Commands: Commander, Mobile Command
- Awards: Order of Canada; Order of Military Merit; Canadian Forces' Decoration

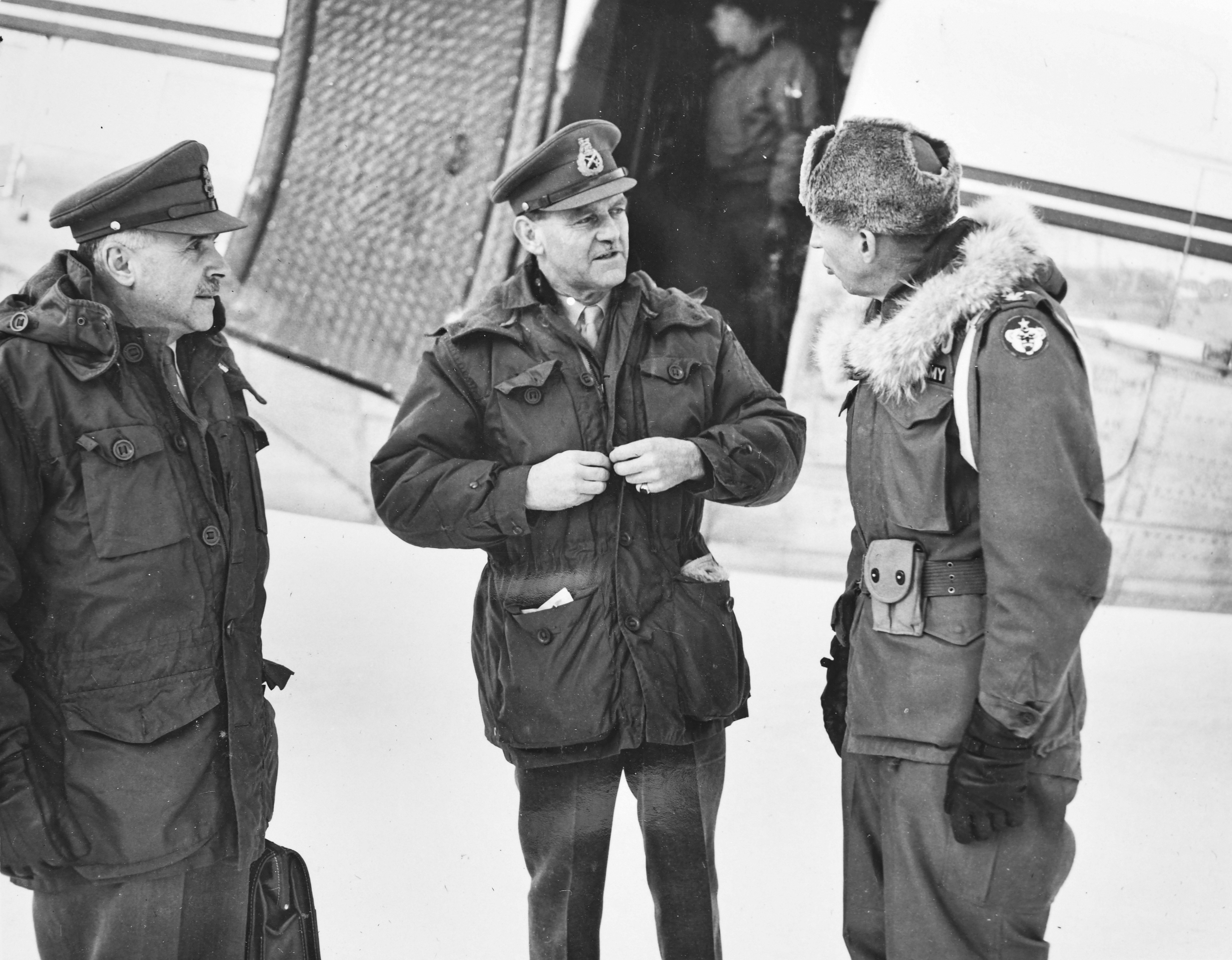
From left to right: Turcot, Maj. Gen. J. M. Rockingham (Western Command, Canada), and Col. R. H. Safford (Chief of Staff, USARAL)

Lieutenant-General Gilles-Antoine Turcot CM CMM CD (9 December 1917 – 15 December 2010) was the Commander, Mobile Command of the Canadian Forces.

== Military career ==
Educated at the Séminaire de Québec and Université Laval, Turcot enlisted in the Canadian Militia in 1935.

He served in World War II, joining Royal 22^{e} Régiment, part of the 1st Canadian Division under Major General Andrew McNaughton, in 1939. After training in England for several years and defending the coast, the Regiment was sent in on the Allied invasion of Sicily, where Turcot was injured. He later fought as a company commander in Eastern Italy, notably at the bitterly fought Battle of Ortona where his regiment was out-numbered but held off a determined German attack aimed at encircling the 1st Canadian Division. He was promoted to command the Regiment when it was redeployed to fight in the liberation of Holland, liberating several Dutch towns.

After the war, he attended the Canadian Army Staff College and later the Imperial Defence College in London. In 1952 he was appointed Director of Military Operations and Planning at National Defence Headquarters and in 1957 he was transferred to the International Commission for Supervision and Control of Laos. Then in 1958 he was put in charge of administration at Quebec Command Headquarters in Montreal.

He became Commanding Officer of 1 Canadian Mechanized Brigade Group in CFB Calgary in 1959 and Director General of Military Training for the Canadian Army in 1962. In 1964 he was made General Officer Commanding the Land Force Atlantic Area and in 1967 was appointed Commander of Allied Command Europe ("ACE") Mobile Force, a multinational NATO flank force based in Seckenheim, Germany. In 1969, he became Commander, Mobile Command. which included all Canadian Land Forces. He led the military response to the October Crisis when the Front de libération du Québec initiated kidnappings in October 1970. Subsequent to retirement he led the administration of the Montreal Olympics and later served as Honorary Colonel of the Royal 22^{e} Régiment.

== Family ==
He married Helen Mitchell and had two daughters.

Military offices
Preceded by William Anderson	Commander, Mobile Command; 1969–1972	Succeeded by William Milroy
