= Charles H. Belzile =

Canadian army officer

- Born: Charles Henri Belzile; March 12, 1933; Trois-Pistoles, Quebec
- Died: December 5, 2016 (aged 83) Ottawa, Ontario
- Buried: Beechwood Cemetery
- Allegiance: Canada
- Branch: Canadian Army/Canadian Forces
- Service years: 35 years
- Rank: Lieutenant General
- Commands: Canadian Army; Royal 22^{e} Régiment
- Awards: Order of Canada; Commander of the Order of Military Merit; Canadian Forces' Decoration; Vimy Award

Lieutenant General Charles Henri Belzile CM, CMM, CD (March 12, 1933 – December 5, 2016) was a Canadian army officer who served as head of the Canadian Army. He is an honorary member of the Royal Military College of Canada student #H22547.

== Education ==
Born in Trois-Pistoles, Quebec, Belzile graduated from the Université de Montréal in 1953.

== Military career ==
Belzile was commissioned in The Queen's Own Rifles of Canada in 1951. He was then assigned as a platoon commander in Korea. Upon his return from the Korean theatre, he assumed a number of staff and command positions including that of adjutant with 2nd Battalion, Queen's Own Rifles of Canada and staff officer at Quebec Command Headquarters in Montreal.

In 1968 he was promoted lieutenant-colonel and appointed commanding officer, Royal 22^{e} Régiment in Valcartier. In 1972, he was appointed Commander, Combat Arms School, at CFB Gagetown, New Brunswick, as a colonel. He was later appointed to several high-profile positions in Canada and abroad. He commanded 4 Canadian Mechanized Brigade Group in the former Federal Republic of Germany as a brigadier-general. As brigadier general he was senior Canadian officer at Headquarters, Central Army Group (CENTAG) in Hammonds Barracks, Seckenheim, Germany. As major-general in 1977 he took command of Canadian Forces Europe. In 1981 he was promoted lieutenant-general and appointed Commander, Mobile Command, the title under which the army was known at that time. He retired from active duty in 1986.

== Later career ==
Following his retirement from the military, he held a position of vice-president with SNC Industrial Technologies of Le Gardeur, Quebec, from 1987 to 1992. Since 1992 he has been President of CH Belzile Consultants. In 1994 he became part of a team on a study to improve the efficiency of the Irish Defence Forces. He served on the Special Commission on the Restructuring of the Canadian Forces Reserves. He was a member of the Special Advisory Group on Military Justice and Military Police Investigation Services. He was appointed colonel commandant of the Royal Canadian Army Cadets from 1993 to 1998. In 1998, he was appointed head of the Military Police Services Review Group. He has served as president of the Canadian Battle of Normandy Foundation (now the Canadian Battlefields Foundation), President of the Conference of Defence Associations and as a member of the Canadian War Museum Advisory Council. Belzile died on December 5, 2016, at the age of 83.

== Honours ==
In 2000, he was made a Member of the Order of Canada. He was a recipient of the Vimy Award, which recognizes a Canadian who has made a significant and outstanding contribution to the defence and security of the nation and the preservation of our democratic values.

On 24 November 2001, he was appointed Honorary Grand President of The Royal Canadian Legion. He is a recipient of the French Légion d'Honneur.

Military offices
Preceded by LCol (BGen) G.R. Therriault, CD	Commander, 2nd Battalion Royal 22nd Regiment; 1968–1970	Succeeded by LCol (MGen) G.H.J. Lessard, CMM, MB, CD
Preceded by	Commander, Combat Training Centre; 1972–1974	Succeeded by
Preceded by BGen P.V.B. Grieve, CD	Commander, 4 Canadian Mechanized Brigade Group; 1974–1976	Succeeded by BGen J.E. Vance, CD
Preceded by	Commander, Canadian Forces Europe; 1977–1979	Succeeded by
Preceded by LGen Jean Jacques Paradis, CMM, CD	Commander, Force Mobile Command; 1981–1986	Succeeded by LGen Jim Fox, CMM, CD
Preceded by	Colonel Commandant, Royal Canadian Infantry Corps; 1988–1992	Succeeded by
Preceded by LGen J.E. Vance, CMM, CD	Colonel Commandant, Royal Canadian Army Cadets; 1992–1996	Succeeded by MGen Howard Wheatly, CD
Preceded by LGen Jean Jacques Paradis, CMM, CD	Colonel of the Royal 22nd Regiment; 1996–2000	Succeeded by MGen J.F.T.A. Liston, MBE, CD
Preceded by Col J.R.G. Saint-Louis, CD	President, Conference Defence Association; 2000-2003	Succeeded by LGen Richard Evraire, CMM, CD
Preceded by	Grand President, Royal Canadian Legion; 2001-2010	Succeeded by Vice Admiral Larry Murray, CM, CMM, CD
