= Jacques Chouinard =

Canadian Army general

- Born: 1 October 1922; Montreal, Quebec, Canada
- Died: 28 July 2008 (aged 85) Quebec, Canada
- Allegiance: Canada
- Branch: Canadian Army/Canadian Forces
- Rank: Lieutenant General
- Commands: Commander, Mobile Command
- Awards: Commander of the Order of Military Merit; Canadian Forces' Decoration

Lieutenant General Jacques Chouinard CMM CD (1 October 1922 – 28 July 2008) was the Commander, Mobile Command of the Canadian Forces.

== Military career ==
Educated at a College in Saint-Anne-de-la-Pocatière, Chouinard was commissioned into Royal 22^{e} Régiment in 1941. He served in World War II with his regiment in England and Italy.

He was made commandant of the School of Parachuting during the Korean War and went on to be commanding officer of the Royal 22^{e} Régiment in 1962. He was appointed commandant of the Royal Military College Saint-Jean in 1968. He was then made commander of CFB Valcartier and of the 5 Canadian Mechanized Brigade Group in 1970. He took command of Canadian Forces on the streets of Montreal in October 1970 during the October Crisis when the Front de libération du Québec initiated kidnappings.

In 1971 he took command of the 4 Canadian Mechanized Brigade Group in Lahr in Germany.

In 1972 he returned to Canada and was appointed commander of the Mobile Command in Saint-Hubert, Quebec. In 1973 he became Assistant to the Associate Deputy Minister (Policy) at National Defence Headquarters. In 1975 he was promoted to lieutenant-general and made commander, Mobile Command. He retired in 1977.

In retirement he became international marketing manager and then president of Industries Valcartier, a munitions business.

Military offices
Preceded by Stanley Waters	Commander, Mobile Command; 1975–1977	Succeeded by Jean Jacques Paradis
