= Maurice Baril =

Canadian military officer

J.G. Maurice Baril
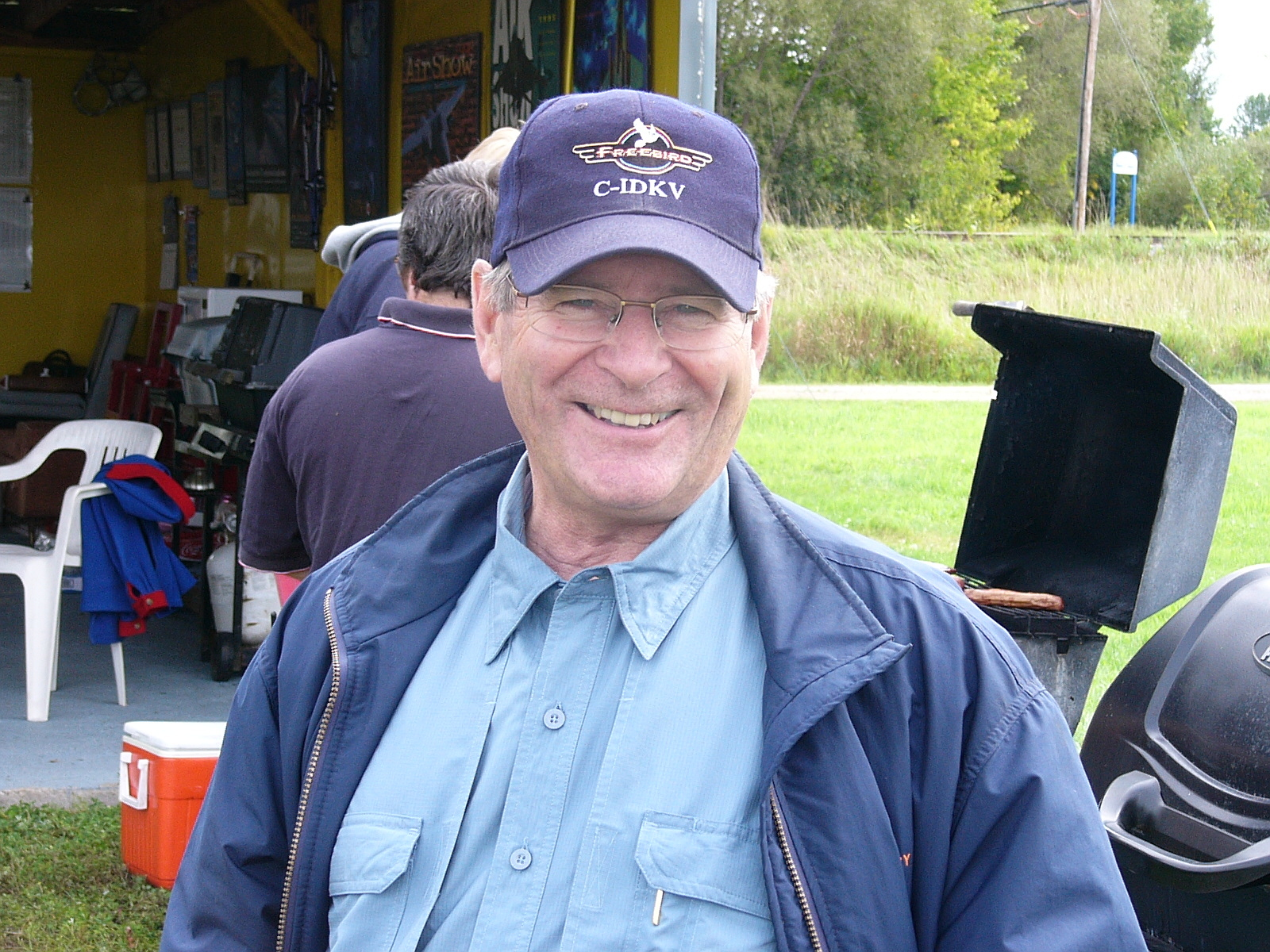
- Maurice Baril, September 2008.
- Born: September 22, 1943 (age 83); Saint-Albert, Quebec
- Military career
- Allegiance: Canada
- Branch: Canadian Army
- Service years: 1963–2001
- Rank: General
- Units: Royal 22^{e} Régiment
- Commands: Chief of the Defence Staff; Head of the Military Division of the Department of Peacekeeping Operations; Commander, CTC Gagetown
- Conflicts: Cyprus
- Awards: Officer of the Order of Canada; Commander of the Order of Military Merit; Meritorious Service Medal; Canadian Forces' Decoration
- Other work: Chairman of the Board of Directors for the Canadian Air Transport Security Authority (2005–07)

Joseph Gérard Maurice Baril, OC CMM MSM CD (born September 22, 1943) is a retired general officer in the Canadian Forces, a military advisor to the United Nations Secretary-General and head of the Military Division of the Department of Peacekeeping Operations of the United Nations from 1992 to 1997, and Chief of the Defence Staff in Canada from 1997 to 2001.

== Early life ==
He was born in Saint-Albert, Quebec, in 1943 and studied at the University of Ottawa from 1961 to 1964, becoming an officer in the Canadian Army in 1963.

== Military career ==
Baril served with the Royal 22nd Regiment from 1964 to 1968. From 1968 to 1971, he served with The Canadian Airborne Regiment in Valcartier, Quebec and Edmonton, Alberta. He commanded land forces in Cyprus and Lahr, Germany, served at Department of National Defence headquarters in Ottawa, Ecole Spéciale Militaire de Saint-Cyr in Paris and as commander of the Combat Training Centre at CFB Gagetown.

He was appointed head of the Military Division of the Department of Peacekeeping Operations (DPKO) at the United Nations in June 1992, where he was military advisor to then under-secretary for peacekeeping operations Kofi Annan.

Baril was in charge of the Military Division at DPKO during the Rwandan genocide where his countryman General Roméo Dallaire was force commander of the United Nations Assistance Mission for Rwanda (UNAMIR). He went on to be chief of Land Force Quebec Area in Montreal in July 1995 and chief of the Land Staff in September 1996.

In 1996 Canada's prime minister Jean Chretien appointed Baril to lead a multinational force, whose main task would be to provide humanitarian aid to refugees in Zaïre, with military assistance if required.

In September 1997, Baril was appointed Chief of the Defence Staff by Governor General Roméo LeBlanc, on the advice of his prime minister, Jean Chrétien.

Baril, along with American general Henry Shelton, was a signatory to the joint Canadian-American military exercise Amalgam Virgo in June 2001. Amalgam Virgo has been cited as a dress rehearsal for the Vigilant Guardian and Global Guardian air exercises conducted during the 9/11 attacks.

Baril retired from the Canadian Forces on July 18, 2001.

== Post military career ==
In 2002, Baril led the Canadian board of inquiry into the friendly fire Tarnak Farm incident on April 17, 2002, near Kandahar, Afghanistan.

In 2003, Baril was an envoy of UN Secretary-General Kofi Annan for establishing a unified national army in the Democratic Republic of the Congo.

Maurice Baril was appointed chairman of the board of directors for the Canadian Air Transport Security Authority (CATSA) in 2005, but resigned in January 2007.

== Honours ==
In 2011, he was made an Officer of the Order of Canada "for his contributions to the nation, notably for his leadership as head of the Canadian Forces, and for his ongoing contributions to peacekeeping around the world".

Military offices
Preceded by Gord Reay	Chief of the Land Staff; 1996–1997	Succeeded by William Leach
Preceded by L. E. Murray	Chief of the Defence Staff; 1997–2001	Succeeded by R. R. J. Henault
