= Commander of the Canadian Army =

Institutional head of the Canadian Army

Commander of the Canadian Army and Chief of the Army Staff
- Flag of the Chief of the General Staff
- Incumbent; Lieutenant-General Michael Wright since 13 July 2024
- Canadian Army
- Type: Army commander
- Abbreviation: CCA
- Member of: Armed Forces Council; Army Staff
- Reports to: Chief of the Defence Staff
- Term length: At His Majesty's pleasure
- Precursor: Chief of the Land Staff
- Formation: 1875 (as General Officer Commanding the Militia); 2011 (as Commander of the Army)
- First holder: Sir E.S. Smyth (as General Officer Commanding the Militia); Peter Devlin (as Commander of the Army)
- Deputy: Deputy Commander of the Canadian Army
- Website: Official website

Commander of the Canadian Army (French: commandant de l'Armée canadienne) is the title of the institutional head of the Canadian Army. This appointment also includes the title of Chief of the Army Staff (French: chef d'état-major de l'Armée) and is based at National Defence Headquarters in Ottawa, Ontario.

== History of the position ==
Prior to 1904, militia forces in Canada were commanded by senior British Army officers appointed as General Officer Commanding the Canadian Militia. British regular forces in the Dominion had their own commander until the withdrawal of the last British garrison in 1906. From 1903 to 1904, the Canadian Militia embarked on a new period of modernization that included the creation of a new office of Chief of the General Staff. Between 1904 and 1964, eighteen officers held the position of Chief of the General Staff, with the last of these, Lieutenant General Geoffrey Walsh, having officially stood down the appointment on 31 August 1964 following the official integration of the three armed services into a single Canadian Armed Forces.

Following the unification of Canada's military forces in February 1968, the majority of Canada's land element was assigned to the newly created Force Mobile Command and the senior Canadian army officer was then known as Commander of Mobile Command from 1965 to 1993. The command was renamed Land Force Command, and its senior officer was known as Chief of the Land Staff from 1993 to 2011. Land Force Command was officially re-designated as the Canadian Army in 2011, at which time the appointment was also renamed Commander of the Canadian Army to reflect this.

== Appointees ==
The following table lists all those who have held the post of Commander of the Canadian Army or its preceding positions. Ranks and honours are as at the completion of their tenure:

No.	Portrait	Name	Took office	Left office	Time in office
General Officer Commanding the Canadian Militia
1	Sir Edward Selby Smyth	Lieutenant-General; Sir Edward Selby Smyth (1819–1896)	1875	1880	4–5 years
2	Richard Luard	Major-General; Richard Luard (1827–1891)	1880	1884	3–4 years
3	Sir Frederick Dobson Middleton	Major-General; Sir Frederick Dobson Middleton (1825–1898)	1884	1890	5–6 years
4	Ivor Herbert	Major-General; Ivor Herbert (1851–1933)	1890	1895	4–5 years
5	Sir William Gascoigne	Major-General; Sir William Gascoigne (1844–1926)	1895	1898	2–3 years
6	Sir Edward Hutton	Major-General; Sir Edward Hutton (1848–1923)	1898	1900	1–2 years
7	Richard O'Grady Haly	Major-General; Richard O'Grady Haly (1841–1911)	1900	1902	1–2 years
8	The Rt Hon. Earl of Dundonald	Major-General; The Rt Hon. Earl of Dundonald (1852–1935)	1902	1904	1–2 years
Chief of the General Staff
1	Sir Percy Lake	Major-General; Sir Percy Lake (1855–1940)	1904	1908	3–4 years
2	Sir William Otter	Major-General; Sir William Otter (1843–1929)	1908	1910	1–2 years
3	Sir Colin Mackenzie	Major-General; Sir Colin Mackenzie (1861–1956)	1910	1913	2–3 years
4	Sir Willoughby Gwatkin	Major-General; Sir Willoughby Gwatkin (1859–1925)	1913	1920	5–6 years
5	Sir James MacBrien	Major-General; Sir James MacBrien (1878–1938)	1920	1927	6–7 years
6	Herbert Cyril Thacker	Major-General; Herbert Cyril Thacker (1870–1953)	1927	1929	1–2 years
7	Andrew McNaughton	Major-General; Andrew McNaughton (1887–1966)	1929	1935	5–6 years
8	Ernest Charles Ashton	Major-General; Ernest Charles Ashton (1873–1957)	1935	1938	2–3 years
9	Thomas Victor Anderson	Major-General; Thomas Victor Anderson (1881–1972)	1938	1940	1–2 years
10	Harry Crerar	Major-General; Harry Crerar (1888–1965)	1940	1941	0–1 years
11	Kenneth Stuart	Lieutenant-General; Kenneth Stuart (1891–1945)	1941	1943	1–2 years
12	John Carl Murchie	Lieutenant-General; John Carl Murchie (1895–1966)	1944	1945	0–1 years
13	Charles Foulkes	Lieutenant-General; Charles Foulkes (1903–1969)	1945	1951	5–6 years
14	Guy Simonds	Lieutenant-General; Guy Simonds (1903–1974)	1951	1955	3–4 years
15	Howard Graham	Lieutenant-General; Howard Graham (1898–1986)	1955	1958	2–3 years
16	Samuel Findlay Clark	Lieutenant-General; Samuel Findlay Clark (1909–1998)	1958	1961	2–3 years
17	Geoffrey Walsh	Lieutenant-General; Geoffrey Walsh (1909–1999)	1961	1964	2–3 years
Commander of Mobile Command
1	Jean Victor Allard	Lieutenant-General; Jean Victor Allard (1913–1996)	1965	1966	0–1 years
2	William Anderson	Lieutenant-General; William Anderson (1915–2000)	1966	1969	2–3 years
3	Gilles Turcot	Lieutenant-General; Gilles Turcot (1917–2010)	1969	1972	2–3 years
4	William A. Milroy	Lieutenant-General; William A. Milroy (1920–2006)	1972	1973	0–1 years
5	Stanley Waters	Lieutenant-General; Stanley Waters (1920–1991)	1973	1975	1–2 years
6	Jacques Chouinard	Lieutenant-General; Jacques Chouinard (1922–2008)	1975	1977	1–2 years
7	Jean Jacques Paradis	Lieutenant-General; Jean Jacques Paradis (1928–2007)	1977	1981	3–4 years
8	Charles H. Belzile	Lieutenant-General; Charles H. Belzile (1933–2016)	1981	1986	4–5 years
9	Jim Fox	Lieutenant-General; Jim Fox	1986	1989	2–3 years
10	Kent Foster	Lieutenant-General; Kent Foster (born 1938)	1989	1991	1–2 years
11	Jim Gervais	Lieutenant-General; Jim Gervais (born 1938)	1991	1993	1–2 years
Chief of the Land Staff
1	Gord Reay	Lieutenant-General; Gord Reay (1943–2000)	1993	September 1996	2–3 years
2	Maurice Baril	Lieutenant-General; Maurice Baril (born 1943)	September 1996	September 1997	1 year
3	William Leach	Lieutenant-General; William Leach (1942–2015)	September 1997	August 2000	2 years, 11 months
4	Mike Jeffery	Lieutenant-General; Mike Jeffery	August 2000	May 2003	2 years, 9 months
5	Rick Hillier	Lieutenant-General; Rick Hillier (born 1955)	May 2003	4 February 2005	1 year, 9 months
6	Marc Caron	Lieutenant-General; Marc Caron (born 1954)	4 February 2005	June 2006	1 year, 3 months
7	Andrew Leslie	Lieutenant-General; Andrew Leslie (born 1957)	June 2006	June 2010	4 years
8	Peter Devlin	Lieutenant-General; Peter Devlin	June 2010	21 July 2011	1 year, 1 month
Commander of the Canadian Army and Chief of the Army Staff
1	Peter Devlin	Lieutenant-General; Peter Devlin	21 July 2011	July 2013	1 year, 11 months
2	Marquis Hainse	Lieutenant-General; Marquis Hainse (born 1964)	July 2013	January 2016	2 years, 6 months
3	Paul Wynnyk	Lieutenant-General; Paul Wynnyk (born 1964)	January 2016	16 July 2018	2 years, 6 months
4	Jean-Marc Lanthier	Lieutenant-General; Jean-Marc Lanthier	16 July 2018	20 August 2019	1 year, 1 month
5	Wayne Eyre	Lieutenant General; Wayne Eyre	20 August 2019	25 November 2021	2 years, 3 months
6	Michel-Henri St-Louis	Major-General; Michel-Henri St-Louis	25 November 2021	16 June 2022	6 months
7	Jocelyn Paul	Lieutenant-General; Jocelyn Paul	16 June 2022	13 July 2024	2 years
8	Michael Wright	Lieutenant-General; Michael Wright	13 July 2024	Incumbent	2 years, 3 months

== See also ==
- Chief of the Defence Staff, the second most senior member of the Canadian Armed Forces after the Commander-in-Chief
- Commander of the Royal Canadian Navy, institutional head of the Royal Canadian Navy
- Commander of the Royal Canadian Air Force, institutional head of the Royal Canadian Air Force
