= Michael Jeffries =

Michael or Mike Jeffries may refer to:

- Michael Jeffries (singer), American rhythm and blues singer
- Mike Jeffries (CEO) (born 1944), former chairman and chief executive officer of Abercrombie & Fitch Co
- Mike Jeffries (soccer) (born 1962), retired American soccer player and current soccer coach
- Mike Jeffries (comics), better known as Turbo, a character in Marvel Comics

== See also ==
- Mike Jefferies, British screenwriter and film producer
- Michael Jeffrey (born 1971), football player
- Michael Jeffery (disambiguation)
