= Homer Tien =

Canadian trauma surgeon and military trauma researcher

Homer Tien CM OMM CD

Operations Lead of the Ontario COVID-19 Vaccination Task Force
- Incumbent
- Assumed office April 4, 2021
- Premier: Doug Ford
- Preceded by: Rick Hillier

Personal details
- Education: Queen's University, B.A., Biochemistry (1989); McMaster University, M.D. (1992); University of Toronto M.Sc., Clinical Epidemiology (2007)
- Occupation: Trauma surgeon
- Awards: Order of Military Merit; Order of Canada

Homer Chin-nan Tien CM OMM CD FRCSC is a Canadian trauma surgeon and the president and CEO of Ornge, an air ambulance non-profit based on Ontario. He also holds the rank of colonel in the Canadian Forces Health Services, associate professorship at the University of Toronto, and was the former director of Trauma Services at Sunnybrook's Tory Regional Trauma Centre. He is the first to hold the Canadian Forces Major Sir Frederick Banting Term Chair in Military Trauma Research.

In April 2021, Tien was appointed to head Ontario's COVID-19 Vaccine Distribution Task Force for Phase 2 of the rollout.

== Biography ==
Tien earned a bachelor's degree in biochemistry from Queen's University in 1989. In 1992, he graduated with a Doctor of Medicine from McMaster University. He then pursued residency training in family medicine before obtaining his Independent Practice Certificate in 1993. His training was sponsored by the Canadian Forces. After training, he was then posted with the 2 Field Ambulance at CFB Petawawa, and served as the unit medical officer for the 1st Battalion of the Royal Canadian Regiment. While at 1 RCR, he deployed to Croatia on Operation Harmony. He then deployed to Bosnia with IFOR on Operation Alliance. He then served with Canadian special forces at Dwyer Hill Training Centre as their first unit medical officer. He has also deployed to the Golan Heights, and has worked with Veterans Affairs in the recovery of RCAF airmen missing from World War II, in the Burma recovery mission.

He later underwent four years of further residency training in general surgery via the Canadian Forces and the University of Toronto from 1998 to 2002.

As a Canadian Forces surgeon, he also deployed to the NATO-led multinational stabilization force in Bosnia in 2003, to Kabul with ISAF in 2004, and multiple times to the Role 3 Multinational Medical Unit in Kandahar.

In 2007, he earned a Master of Science in clinical epidemiology from the University of Toronto.

== Honours and awards ==
Tien was awarded the Officer of the Order of Military Merit (OMM) in December 2011.

In July 2012, Tien was presented with the Canadian Forces Major Sir Frederick Banting Term Chair in Military Trauma Research.

In 2019, Tien was appointed a Fellow of the Canadian Institute for Military and Veteran Health Research.

He was made an Member of the Order of Canada in 2025.

== Research ==
Tien's research focuses mostly on combat trauma care and war surgery, prehospital trauma care, and improving trauma care to populations working and living in remote areas.

== Selected publications ==
- Pannell D, Brisebois R, Talbot M, Trottier V, Clement J, Garraway N, McAlister V, Tien HC. Causes of death in Canadian Forces members deployed to Afghanistan and implications on tactical combat casualty care provision. J Trauma. 2011 Nov;71(5 Suppl 1):S401–7.
- Tien HC, Jung V, Pinto R, Mainprize T, Scales DC, Rizoli SB. Reducing time-to-treatment decreases mortality of trauma patients with acute subdural hematoma. Ann Surg. 2011 Jun;253(6):1178–83.
- Tien HC, Farrell R, Macdonald J. Preparing Canadian military surgeons for Afghanistan. CMAJ. 2006;175(11):1365–66.
- Tien HC, Jung V, Rizoli SB, Acharya SV, Macdonald JC. An evaluation of tactical combat casualty care interventions in a combat environment. J Am Coli Surg. 2008;207(2):174–78.
- Tien HC, Acharya SV, Redelmeier DA. Preventing deaths in the Canadian military. Am J Prev Med. 2010;38(3):331–9.
