= Ronald Buck =

Canadian navy officer

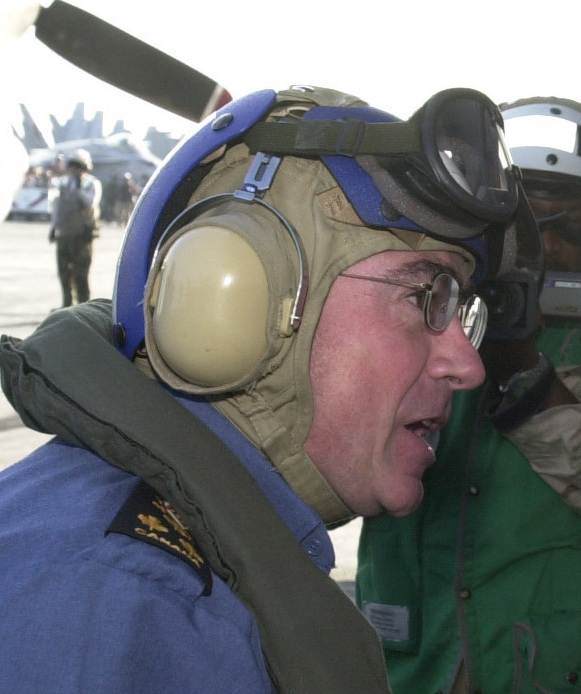
- Buck in 2013
- Born: Montreal, Quebec
- Allegiance: Canada
- Branch: Royal Canadian Navy; Canadian Forces Maritime Command
- Service years: 1967–2006
- Rank: Vice-Admiral
- Commands: HMCS Restigouche; Fifth Canadian Destroyer Squadron; Canadian Fleet Pacific; Maritime Forces Pacific; Maritime Command
- Conflicts: War in Afghanistan
- Awards: Commander of the Order of Military Merit; Order of Saint John; Canadian Forces' Decoration

Vice-Admiral Ronald Douglas Buck CMM, CD is a retired officer of the Canadian Forces. He was Chief of the Maritime Staff from 21 June 2001 to 25 August 2004. He was appointed as Vice Chief of the Defence Staff in 2004 before retiring in 2006.

== Career ==
Buck joined the Royal Canadian Navy in 1967. He became Commanding Officer of the destroyer HMCS Restigouche in 1987, Project Manager for the Maritime Coastal Defence Vessel Project in 1989 and Commander Fifth Canadian Destroyer Squadron in 1992. He went on to be Commander Canadian Forces Training System in 1994, Chief of Staff of the Management Command and Control Reengineering Team at the National Defence Headquarters in 1995 and Commander Canadian Fleet Pacific in 1997. After that he was appointed Chief of the Maritime Staff in 2001 (during which he took part in Operation Apollo – the anti-terrorism initiative – in 2001) and Vice Chief of the Defence Staff in 2004 before retiring in 2006.

== Awards and decorations ==
Buck's personal awards and decorations include the following:

Ribbon	Description	Notes
	Order of Military Merit (CMM)	Appointed Commander (CMM) on 26 October 1999; Appointed Officer (OMM) on 18 November 1992
	Order of St John	Appointed Member on 18 December 2003
	Special Service Medal	with NATO-OTAN Clasp
	Sovereign's Medal for Volunteers	Decoration awarded 28 September 2017; (26 February 2018)
	125th Anniversary of the Confederation of Canada Medal	Decoration awarded in 1992
	Queen Elizabeth II Golden Jubilee Medal	Decoration awarded in 2002; Canadian version
	Queen Elizabeth II Diamond Jubilee Medal	Decoration awarded in 2012; Canadian version
	Canadian Forces' Decoration (CD)	with two Clasp for 32 years of services

Military offices
Preceded by Greg Maddison	Chief of the Maritime Staff; 2001–2004	Succeeded by Bruce MacLean
Preceded by George Macdonald	Vice Chief of the Defence Staff; 2004–2006	Succeeded by Walter Natynczyk
