= Kent Foster =

- Born: 1937 or 1938 (age 87–88); Coleman, Alberta
- Allegiance: Canada
- Branch: Canadian Army/Canadian Forces
- Rank: Lieutenant General
- Commands: Commander Mobile Command
- Awards: Commander of the Order of Military Merit; Canadian Forces' Decoration

Lieutenant General Kent Richard Foster CMM, CD (born c. 1938) was the Commander Mobile Command of the Canadian Forces.

== Military career ==
Foster graduated from the Royal Military College of Canada in 1960. He served with the Canadian Airborne Regiment and rose through the Officer ranks to become Commander, Mobile Command in 1989. In that role, during the Oka Crisis in 1990, John de Chastelain, Chief of Defence Staff instructed him to take charge in a crisis over barricades placed by members of the Mohawk nation in a land dispute. Foster also deployed Canadian troops during the Gulf War.

In retirement he became an Assistant Deputy Minister for Health and a Governor of Royal Roads University.

Military offices
Preceded by Jim Fox	Commander, Mobile Command; 1989–1991	Succeeded by Jim Gervais
