= William Anderson (Canadian Army officer) =

Canadian general

- Born: 7 May 1915; Montreal, Quebec, Canada
- Died: 17 February 2000 (aged 84) Ottawa, Ontario, Canada
- Allegiance: Canada
- Branch: Canadian Army/Canadian Forces
- Rank: Lieutenant General
- Commands: Commander, Mobile Command
- Awards: Officer of the Order of the British Empire; Canadian Forces' Decoration

Lieutenant-General William Alexander Beaumont Anderson OBE, CD (7 May 1915 – 17 February 2000) was the commander, Mobile Command of the Canadian Forces.

== Military career ==
Anderson graduated from the Royal Military College of Canada in 1936 and from Queen's University in 1937 and then joined the Canadian Army in 1939.

He served in the Second World War with the Royal Canadian Artillery, becoming personal assistant to General Harry Crerar in 1942, commanding officer of 15 Field Regiment, Royal Canadian Artillery in 1943 and a general staff officer with Canadian Forces in North West Europe in 1944.

After the war he was made director of military intelligence. He was appointed commander of Western Ontario Area in 1952 and of 1st Canadian Infantry Brigade in Germany in 1953. He went on to be vice adjutant-general in 1957, deputy chief of the general staff in 1959 and commandant of the Royal Military College of Canada in 1960. He was made adjutant-general in 1962 and deputy chief of reserves in 1965. He was appointed commander, Mobile Command in 1966. He retired in 1969.

In retirement he was president of the Royal Life Saving Society of Canada.

== Honours ==
Pipe Major William Stirling composed the 'Lieutenant General W.A.B. Anderson' 2/4 march in honour of 2265 BGen William Anderson (RMC 1932), who served as commandant of RMC in 1960.

A classroom in the School of Military Mapping in Ottawa, Ontario, is named for his father, Major-General William Beaumont Anderson, CMG, DSO, for his contributions to military mapping before and after the First World War.

Military offices
Preceded by Jean Allard	Commander, Mobile Command; 1966–1969	Succeeded by Gilles Turcot
