= William Leach (Canadian Army officer) =

Bill Leach
- Born: November 6, 1942; Sarnia, Ontario, Canada
- Died: April 1, 2015 (aged 72); Ottawa, Ontario, Canada
- Military career
- Allegiance: Canada
- Branch: Canadian Forces
- Rank: Lieutenant General
- Commands: Chief of the Land Staff
- Awards: Commander of the Order of Military Merit; Canadian Forces' Decoration

Lieutenant-General William Charles Leach CMM, CD (November 6, 1942 – April 1, 2015) was the Chief of the Land Staff of the Canadian Forces.

== Military career ==
Leach graduated from the Royal Military College of Canada with a degree in Economics and Commerce in 1965 and was commissioned into the Canadian Army. He went on to command a Logistic Battalion. From 1977 he worked in a series of senior administrative and finance positions at National Defence Headquarters and from 1987 he held various supply and logistics appointments there.

In 1995 he was appointed Deputy Commander at Canadian Forces Land Force Command and in 1997 he became Chief of the Land Staff, a post he held until Summer 2000.

In 2000 he was appointed a Vice President Operations with Honeywell Canada Logistic Services and in 2005 he was made a Vice President of Mincom Defence. Leach was Chairman of the Board of the Canadian Museum of History. He was also a board member of the Royal Ottawa Hospital. Leach was also on the Executive Committee of the Military Families Fund and was the Colonel Commandant of the Logistics Branch of the Canadian Armed Forces.

== Family ==
He was married to Canadian artist Mary Louise Leach, who died in 2003; Both he and his wife are buried at The National Military Cemetery at Beechwood. They had three children. Leach died in Ottawa on April 1, 2015.

Military offices
| Preceded by Maurice Baril | Chief of the Land Staff; 1997–2000 | Succeeded by Mike Jeffery |
