= Jim Gervais =

- Born: March 5, 1938 (age 88); Noranda, Quebec
- Allegiance: Canada
- Branch: Canadian Army/Canadian Forces
- Rank: Lieutenant General
- Commands: Commander, Mobile Command
- Awards: Commander of the Order of Military Merit; Canadian Forces' Decoration

Lieutenant-General James Cyrille Gervais, CMM, CD (born March 5, 1938) was the Commander, Mobile Command of the Canadian Forces.

== Military career ==
Born at Rouyn-Noranda and educated at the University of Ottawa, Gervais graduated from the Royal Military College of Canada in 1962. He later attended the Royal Military College of Science in the United Kingdom.

He was appointed Commander of 5 Canadian Mechanized Brigade Group at Valcartier and then Chief of Personnel and Senior Appointments at National Defence Headquarters. In 1991 he was appointed Commander, Mobile Command in which role he carried out a restructuring of the Land Forces.

In retirement he became Deputy Secretary for Honours to the Governor-General of Canada. In 2008 he became Chairman of Northern Gold Mining. He is also part of a management team operating a proposed medical marijuana growing business near Kirkland Lake, Ontario.

== Arms ==
Coat of arms of Jim Gervais
Notes Granted 21 January 1993. Crest A demi springbok Azure horned and gorged with a collar of twelve maple leaves (six visible) Or bearing between its forelegs the baton of office of the Deputy Herald Chancellor of the Canadian Heraldic Authority Proper. Escutcheon Azure a polar bear passant Argent between three maple leaves Or. Supporters On a grassy mound set with two blueberry bushes (Vaccinium canadense) flowered and fructed Proper rising above barry wavy Argent and Azure dexter a stallion sinister a mare both Argent queued crined unguled and gorged with a coronet fleury Or enhanced at the rim Azure and charged with shamrocks Or. Motto Loyauté Vaillance Intégrité (French for 'Loyalty, valiance, integrity')

Military offices
Preceded by Kent Foster	Commander, Mobile Command; 1991–1993	Succeeded by Gord Reay (as Chief of the Land Staff)
