= Medal of Military Valour =

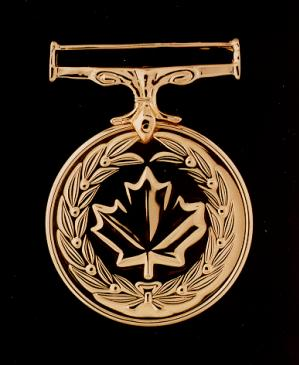
- Obverse of the medal
- Type: Military decoration
- Awarded for: An act of valour or devotion in the presence of the enemy
- Presented by: The monarch of Canada
- Post-nominals: MMV
- Status: Currently awarded
- Established: 2 February 1993
- First award: 27 October 2006

Highlights
- Total: 55
- Ribbon bars of the Medal of Military Valour (MMV with Bar at bottom)

Precedence
- Next (higher): Meritorious Service Cross
- Next (lower): Medal of Bravery

The Medal of Military Valour (French: Médaille de la vaillance militaire) is a military decoration that is, within the Canadian system of honours, the third highest award for military valour, and one of three honours for military valour gifted by the Canadian monarch, generally through his or her viceroy-in-Council. Created in 1993, the medal is presented to both living and deceased members of the Canadian Forces deemed to have carried out "an act of valour or devotion to duty in the presence of the enemy," and grants recipients the ability to use the post-nominal letters MMV.

== History ==
On 2 February 1993, three decorations, including the Medal of Military Valour, were created by Queen Elizabeth II as a family of Canadian military valour decorations. The first awarding of the star was by Governor General Michaëlle Jean, on 27 October 2006; only with Canada's participation in the 2001 invasion of Afghanistan did there emerge, for the first time since 1993, circumstances wherein one could carry out actions deserving of the Medal of Military Valour.

== Design ==
The Medal of Military Valour is in the form of a gold medal with, on the reverse, the Royal Cypher of the reigning monarch beneath a St. Edward's Crown—symbolizing the Canadian monarch's roles as both fount of honour and Commander-in-Chief of the Canadian Forces—and the inscription PRO VALORE. The obverse bears a maple leaf surrounded by a laurel wreath, and the name and rank of the recipient is engraved on the medal's edge.

This medallion is worn on the left chest, on a 38 millimetres (1.5 in) wide crimson ribbon with three vertical white stripes: for men, hung from a bar, and for women, on a ribbon bow, both pinned to the left chest. Should an individual already possessing a Medal of Military Valour be awarded the medal again for subsequent valourous acts, he or she is granted a simple gold medal bar, bearing a maple leaf at its centre, for wear on the ribbon from which the original medal is suspended;

== Eligibility and receipt ==
The medal is awarded only to members of the Canadian Forces, or members of allied armed forces serving alongside the Canadian Forces, who have shown conspicuous acts of valiance in the face of enemy hostility. Should a person meet these criteria, nominations are made through his or her chain of command to the Military Valour Decorations Advisory Committee—a part of the Chancellery of Honours at Government House—which then makes its recommendations to the Governor General of Canada, via the Chief of the Defence Staff. Once they have been decorated with the Medal of Military Valour, recipients are granted the right to use the post-nominal letters MMV. The Medal of Military Valour can be awarded posthumously, as well as multiple times. By January 2026 the decoration had been awarded 84 times. No bars have yet been issued.

== See also ==
- Canadian order of precedence (decorations and medals)
- State decoration
