= William A. Milroy =

Canadian Army general (1920–2006)

William Milroy
- Born: 25 June 1920; Brownlee, Saskatchewan, Canada
- Died: 20 February 2006 (aged 85) Ottawa, Ontario, Canada
- Allegiance: Canada
- Branch: Canadian Army/Canadian Forces
- Rank: Lieutenant General
- Commands: Assistant Deputy Minister of Defence, Personnel
- Awards: Member of the Order of Canada; Distinguished Service Order; Canadian Forces' Decoration

Lieutenant General William Alexander Milroy CM, DSO, CD (25 June 1920 – 20 February 2006) was the Commander, Mobile Command of the Canadian Forces and later Assistant Deputy Minister of Defence, Personnel.

== Military career ==
Educated at the University of Alberta, Milroy was commissioned into Lord Strathcona's Horse in 1941.

He served in World War II and in 1943 was deployed to Italy taking part in the Melfa River, Torrice Crossroads encounter and Gothic Line actions. In 1944 he was wounded and evacuated to Naples. Rejoining his Squadron he took part in the Porter Force and Lamone River actions. In 1945 he took part in the Liberation of Arnhem and the advance to IJsselmeer in the Netherlands. He then joined the Canadian Army Occupation Force.

In 1946 he became first Canadian Liaison Officer at the Headquarters Army Field Forces in the United States and in 1954 he joined the Directing Staff at the Staff College, Camberley in England. He was appointed Director of Public Relations for the Army in 1957, Commandant of the Armoured Corps School in Camp Borden in 1960 and Director of Military Training for the Army at National Defence Headquarters in 1962.

In 1963 he was appointed Commander 3 Canadian Infantry Brigade Group at CFB Gagetown. In 1965 he was appointed Commandant of the Canadian Army Staff College and 1968 he became the Canadian member of the International Team of Observers in Nigeria.

He assumed command of the Canadian Defence Education Establishments in 1969 and took over Training Command at Winnipeg in 1971. In 1972 he was promoted to Lieutenant-General and made Commander, Mobile Command. In 1973, he was appointed Assistant Deputy Minister of Defence for Personnel.

He died on 20 February 2006 of pulmonary fibrosis.

== Family ==
He was married to Ann deKoven Tilton and had two daughters Elizabeth LaMotte Cates Milroy and Ann Alexandra Milroy, and one son Rollin Tilton Milroy.

Military offices
Preceded by Gilles Turcot	Commander, Mobile Command; 1972–1973	Succeeded by Stanley Waters
