= Canadian Army Command and Staff College =

Coordinates: 44°14′00″N 76°28′43″W

- Collège de commandement et d'état‑major de l'Armée canadienne
- Badge of the CACSC
- Active: 1946–present
- Country: Canada
- Branch: Canadian Army
- Type: Staff college
- Part of: Canadian Army Doctrine and Training Centre
- Headquarters: Fort Frontenac
- Mottos: Tam Marte quam Minerva (Latin for 'Both Mars and Minerva')
- Website: canada.ca/en/department-national-defence/services/benefits-military/education-training/establishments/command-staff-college.html

Commanders
- Commandant: LCol D. Dubois (acting)

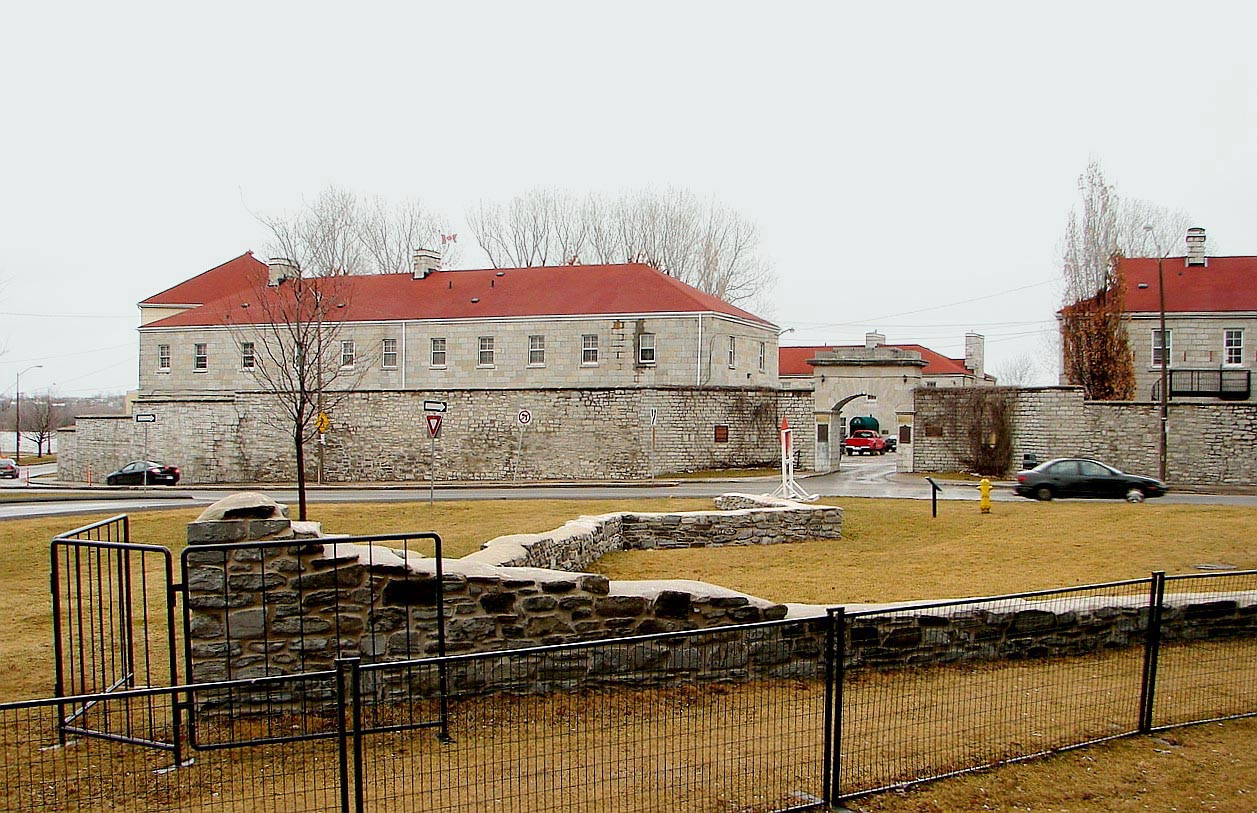
Remnants of the old fort, with the new Fort Frontenac in the background

The Canadian Army Command and Staff College (CACSC), formerly the Canadian Land Force Command and Staff College, is a staff college for officers of the Canadian Armed Forces, specializing in staff and army operations courses. It is at Fort Frontenac in Kingston, Ontario, Canada.

== Courses offered ==
CACSC is charged with developing in army officers the ability to perform command and staff functions in war.

The following courses are offered at CACSC:

- Army Operations Course
- Primary Reserve Army Operations Course
- Military Training and Cooperation Program – North Atlantic Treaty Organization
- Unit Command Team Course
- Primary Reserve Unit Command Team Course
- Information Management Officer Course
- Joint Tactical Targeting Course
- Collateral Damage Estimation Course

== College commandants ==
- Lt Col G.G. Simonds (1941)
- Maj-Gen H.F.H. Hertzberg, CMG, DSO, MC (1941-1944)
- Brig D.G. Cunningham, DSO (1944-1945)
- Brig J.D.B. Smith, CBE, DSO (1945-1946)
- Maj-Gen J.F.M. Whiteley, CB, CBE, MC (1947-1949)
- Lt-Gen G.G. Simonds, CB, CBE, DSO, CD (1949-1951)
- Brig G. Kitching, CBE, DSO, CD (1951-1954)
- Brig Mortimer Patrick Bogert, CBE, DSO, CD (1954-1958)
- Brig R. Rowley, DSO, ED, CD (1958-1962)
- Brig D.C. Cameron, DSO, ED, CD (1962-1966)
- Brig B.F. Macdonald, DSO, CD (1966)
- Brig W.A. Milroy, DSO, CD (1966-1968)
- BGen W.A. Milroy, DSO, CD (1968-1969)
- BGen D.S. MacLennan, CD (1969-1971)
- BGen F.W. Wootton, CD (1971-1974)
- BGen P.V.B. Grieve, CD (1974-1976)
- BGen C.L. Kirby, CD (1976-1979)
- Col P.H.C. Carew, CD (1979-1980)
- BGen P.H.C. Carew, CD (1980-1982)
- BGen J.A. Cotter, CD (1982-1984)
- BGen R.I. Stewart, CD (1984-1987)
- BGen C. Milner, OMM, CD (1987-1989)
- MGen C. Milner, OMM, CD (1989)
- BGen T.F. De Faye, OMM, CD (1989-1991)
- Col R.S. Billings, CD (1991-1992)
- BGen R.P. Alden, OMM, CD (1992-1994)
- Col J.S. Labbe, CD (1994-1996)
- BGen M.K. Jeffery, OMM, CD (1996-1997)
- BGen J. Arp, CD (1997-1999)
- Col M. Lessard, CD (1999-2000)
- BGen M. Lessard, CD (2000-2001)
- BGen G.W. Nordick, OMM< MSC, CD (2001-2003)
- Col J.R. Ferron, CD (2003-2005)
- Col J.C. Collin, OMM, CD (2005-2007)
- Col F.A. Lewis, MSM, CD (2007-2009)
- Col J. Cade, MSM, CD (2009-2011)
- Col B.W.G. McPherson, CD (2011-2013)
- Col R.D.K. Walker, MSC, CD (2013-2015)
- Col G.R. Smith, MSM, CD (2015-2016)
- LCol J.G.J Trudel, CD (2016)
- Col D.D. Basinger, CD (2016-2018)
- Col D.J. Cross, CD (2018-2019)
- Col R.T. Strickland, CD (2019-2022)
- Col K.L. Solomon, CD (2022-2023)
- Col F.G. Auld, OMM, MSM, CD, P.Eng (2024–2026)

== See also ==
- Canadian Forces College
- Fort Frontenac Library
