= HMAS Oxley =

Two submarines of the Royal Australian Navy (RAN) have been named HMAS Oxley, for the explorer John Oxley.

- HMAS Oxley, an Odin-class submarine launched in 1926 and transferred to the Royal Navy in 1931.
- HMAS Oxley (S 57), an Oberon-class submarine launched in 1965, decommissioned in 1992, and broken up for scrap.
