= Roger Rowley =

Major General Roger Rowley, DSO, ED, CD, GCLJ, GOMLJ (12 June 1914 - 14 February 2007) was a Canadian Army officer who was awarded a Distinguished Service Order for his role in liberating Boulogne during September 1944, and a Bar five weeks later for the capture of Breskens on the Scheldt estuary.

== Early life ==
Rowley was born in Ottawa, Canada, on 12 June 1914. He was educated at Ashbury College Ottawa, Dalhousie University in Halifax, Nova Scotia. After graduation, Rowley became a bond trader. He joined the Canadian militia and was commissioned as an officer in the Cameron Highlanders of Ottawa in 1933.

== Second World War ==
In the early years of the war, Captain (and later Major) Rowley served with the Cameron Highlanders of Ottawa when they deployed overseas with the 3rd Canadian Infantry Division. This included the regiment's part in the raid on Iceland in 1940. Troops were sent to the northern island country to destroy facilities that might have been of use to German forces if they were to invade the island. The raid was a success.

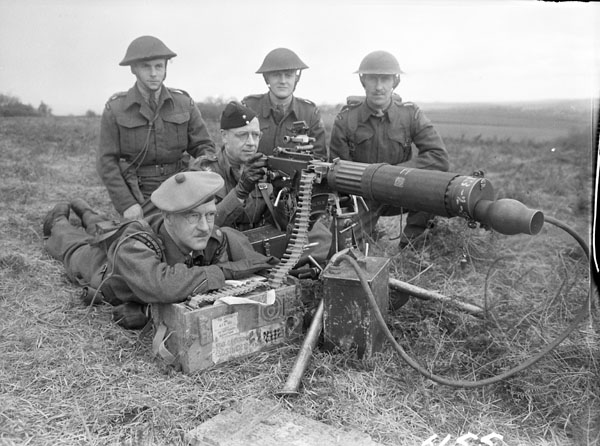
Rowley (rear, right) with other officers of the Cameron Highlanders of Ottawa in England in 1942

The Vickers machine gun was, along with 4.2-inch (110 mm) mortars, the primary weapon of the CH of O as it performed its duties as the Support Battalion to the 3rd Canadian Infantry Division.

Promoted to Lieutenant Colonel, Rowley commanded the Stormont, Dundas and Glengarry Highlanders, during the Allied campaign in North West Europe during 1944. The SD&G formed part of 3rd Canadian Infantry Division, whose participation secured the liberation of the Channel ports of Boulogne and Calais. The Canadians launched their attack on Boulogne on 17 September 1944. The battle raged for six days until the remaining German prisoners surrendered on 22 September. Rowley's DSO citation praised his speed and daring after the heavy bombing of the château outside the town, as well as his action under heavy artillery and machine-gun fire as the battalion attacked the citadel: "This officer's leadership, dash, bravery and unlimited energy were an inspiration to his officers and men, and his action was one of the principal factors in the capture of Boulogne."

On 22 October 1944, Rowley was ordered to capture the port of Breskens on the Scheldt estuary. The infantry assault was postponed due to heavy losses among the tank support. Less than two hours later a signal, said to have been ordered by Winston Churchill, insisted there could be no delay. Rowley's infantry assaulted along the sea wall and by noon they held the harbour. Rowley's citation for his DSO Bar, signed by Montgomery, declared that despite the shortage of time: "Lt-Col Rowley planned and ordered the new attack with such brilliance and led it with such determination that the garrison was quickly overcome and Breskens was captured."

After the German surrender, Rowley was posted to the Far East to command an infantry training battalion. After the Japanese surrender, he attended the Staff College, Camberley before joining the Canadian Army staff in Washington, DC. He served in Canada's NATO army until the late 1960s.

== Later military career ==
After the war, Rowley served at the National Defence Headquarters in Ottawa as Director of Military Training. He commanded the 2nd Canadian Infantry Brigade Group in Germany, then spent a year at the Imperial Defence College in London before becoming commandant at the staff college at Kingston. He was general officer-in-waiting at the Sovereign's Parade during 1976's Royal visit to Canada.
