= Meritorious Service Cross =

Meritorious service decoration in Canada

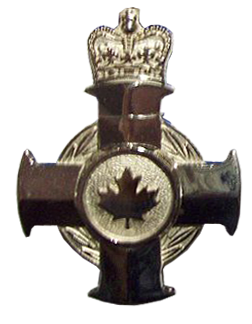
- Obverse of the insignia
- Type: State decoration
- Awarded for: An action performed in an outstanding manner that brings great benefit or honour to the Canadian Forces or to Canada.
- Presented by: The monarch of Canada
- Post-nominals: MSC (English); CSM (French)
- Status: Currently awarded
- Established: 11 June 1984 (military division); 6 June 1991 (civil division)

Highlights
- Total: 186
- Ribbon bars of the Meritorious Service Cross (MSC with Bar on right); military division at top, civil division at bottom

Precedence
- Next (higher): Star of Courage
- Next (lower): Medal of Military Valour

The Meritorious Service Cross (French: Croix du service méritoire) is a decoration that is, within the Canadian system of honours, one of the two Meritorious Service Decorations gifted by the Canadian monarch, his or her Governor-in-Council. Created in 1984, the medal is intended to recognize individuals—both Canadian and foreign—who have carried out meritorious acts bringing benefit and honour in either of two categories: military and civilian.

== Design ==
The Meritorious Service Cross, for both divisions, is in the form of a Greek cross with the arms 38 mm across, the ends splayed and rounded, a laurel wreath visible between them, and a St. Edward's Crown, as a symbol of the Canadian monarch's role as the fount of honour, capping the top arm. At the cross' centre, on the obverse, is a roundel bearing a maple leaf, and on the reverse are two concentric circles, the inner one containing an etched Royal Cypher of the reigning monarch, and the outer one engraved with the words MERITORIOUS SERVICE MÉRITOIRE.

This medallion is worn on the left chest, on a 32 mm wide, blue and white ribbon; however, that for the military division has only two white stripes, each 6 mm wide and centred on the outer third of each side of the ribbon, while that for the civilian division has an additional 1 mm wide white stripe centred between the other two. For men, the cross is hung from a bar, and for women, on a ribbon bow, both pinned to the left chest. Individuals awarded a second Meritorious Service Cross are granted a medal bar, in silver and bearing a central maple leaf, for wear on the ribbon from which the original medal is suspended.

== Eligibility and receipt ==
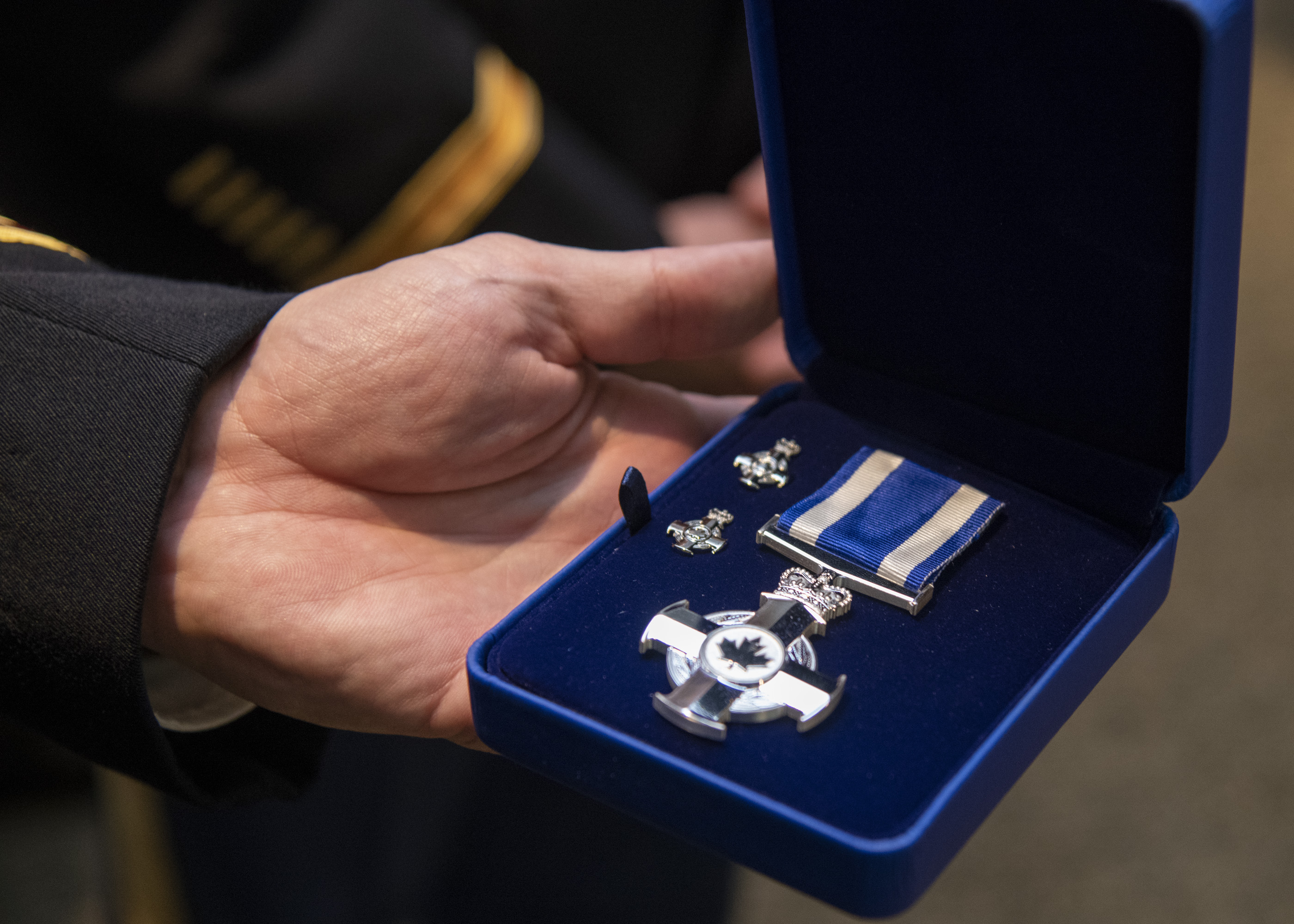
The Cross awarded to Joseph F. Dunford

On 11 June 1984, Queen Elizabeth II, on the advice of her Cabinet under Prime Minister Pierre Trudeau, created the Meritorious Service Cross to recognize highly professional acts that are of considerable benefit to the Canadian Forces; the civilian division was then added on 6 June 1991 (though applicable retroactively to 1984), honouring similar acts—whether in athletics, diplomatic relations, humanitarian activities, etc.—that benefit the nation. Any person, living or deceased, may be nominated for the medal: the military division is awarded to members of the Canadian Forces, or of any foreign military allied with Canada, and nominations come from commanding officers; the civilian division is open to both Canadians and foreigners, and nominations may be submitted by any person. In all cases, however, the event being recognized must have taken place in Canada or involved Canadian citizens.

An award enables recipients to use the post-nominal letters MSC (in French: CSM). As of March 2020, the Meritorious Service Cross has been presented to 410 people; 224 have been awarded in the military division and 187 in the civilian, with Chris Hadfield having been awarded one in each category.

== See also ==
- Meritorious Service Medal (Canada)
- Canadian order of precedence (decorations and medals)
- State decoration
