= Thierry de Roucy =

French priest

Thierry de Roucy (born 1957, in Noyon, France) was the founder and former chairman of Points Cœur (Heart's Home), a Catholic movement promoting a "Culture of Compassion". Convicted in 2011 by the Ecclesiastical Court of Lyon for sexual abuse and abuse of power, he was removed from the clerical state in 2018. All ecclesiastical structures of Points-Cœur were dissolved by 2020.

== Biography ==
Thierry de Roucy was 18 when he entered the religious congregation of the Servants of Jesus and Mary at the Abbey of Ourscamp in France. He attended courses given by Thomas Philippe at "La Ferme" of L'Arche in Trosly-Breuil, near his hometown, and considered himself Philippe's spiritual son. Philippe had received repeated prohibitions from the Holy Office since 1956 for sexual abuse; later investigations confirmed that he had sexually abused women in the context of spiritual direction. He received his bachelor and master of Philosophy from the Institute of Comparative Philosophy in Paris. He is an alumnus of the Pontifical University of St. Thomas Aquinas Angelicum in Rome where he earned a Master of Theology. He was ordained a priest in 1983. From 1988 to 2001, he was the Superior General of his congregation.

In 1990, he founded Points Cœur (Heart's Home), inspired by the spirituality of Thomas Philippe, striving to bring consolation and compassion to the most wounded people and to restore their dignity through friendship and grassroots services. At the request of former Heart's Home volunteers, Thierry de Roucy founded three new branches of the organization: in 1994, the Servants of God's Presence, a congregation of religious sisters; in 1995, the Heart's Home Permanent Members — for lay consecrated men and women — and the Sacerdotal Molokai Fraternity — for seminarians and priests.

In October 1994, he opened the Institut Thomas Philippe, a centre for philosophical and theological formation whose students studied the works and unpublished courses of the Dominican friar who had died a year earlier.

Thierry de Roucy also founded a publishing house, "Les éditions du Serviteur", and published about 20 books including his own essays and translated works of Adrienne von Speyr, Hans Urs von Balthasar and Catherine Doherty (among others).

== Sexual abuse and ecclesiastical condemnations ==
Following testimonies in the 2000s denouncing a cult of personality around de Roucy and a highly controlling ideology, and an alert made to the Church by a priest, who had been a victim of sexual abuse under his influence, the Congregation for the Doctrine of the Faith opened internal judicial proceedings that concluded after a seven-year trial.

On 21 June 2011, de Roucy was convicted by the ecclesiastical court of Lyon for "sexual abuse, abuse of power, and absolution of the accomplice" towards a young priest who was subsequently laicized at his own request, the Church having recognized that he had been under a state of undue influence. This case has never been brought to a Civil Court.

De Roucy remained listed as Chairman of the Board of Heart's Home USA, the US affiliate of Points Cœur today known as Con-solatio, in the organization's tax filings as late as 2014.

In 2014, a canonical inquiry report by Dominican Loïc-Marie Le Bot concluded that the movement suffered from "self-referentiality", "mistrust towards the Church", and "deficiencies in the formation" of its members.

In February 2016, Bishop Dominique Rey of Fréjus-Toulon declared him suspens a divinis — prohibiting him from administering the sacraments — for a "serious failure" in his duty of obedience, and entrusted provisional leadership of Points-Cœur to retired Bishop Jean-Marie Le Vert of Quimper.

Having declared himself insolvent, he had not paid the reparations to his victim — initially set at €60,000 in 2011 and raised to €80,000 on appeal in 2015. In February 2017, the Diocese of Fréjus-Toulon confirmed that a suspensive excommunication procedure was underway, at the request of and in coordination with the Congregation for the Doctrine of the Faith; the procedure would lapse upon payment of the sum owed. De Roucy had lodged appeals in Rome against the excommunication procedure. On 22 June 2018, he was removed from the clerical state by the Congregation for the Clergy for persistent disobedience; at the time of his laicization, the excommunication had not yet taken effect.

== Dissolution of Points Cœur ==
Following the laicization of its founder, all ecclesiastical branches of Points Cœur were dissolved between 2017 and 2020. The private association of the faithful voted to dissolve itself on 1 April 2020. Points Cœur was thereby stripped of its canonical status; however, it continued to describe itself as a 'Catholic NGO'. In 2023, Cardinal Secretary of State Pietro Parolin warned French bishops that the organization continued to present itself as a Catholic community despite the dissolution, and that diocesan bishops "cannot in any case reconstitute the suppressed Associations, either in another form or under another name."

== Légion d'Honneur ==
De Roucy was appointed a Knight of the Légion d'Honneur in 2003 and promoted to Officer on 31 December 2012. On 13 November 2018, he was stripped of the distinction following his laicization.

== Bibliography ==
- Céline Hoyeau (2021). La Trahison des pères. Emprise et abus des fondateurs de communautés nouvelles. Bayard. ISBN 978-2-2274-9870-9.
