= Points Cœur =

- Formation: 1990
- Type: Non-governmental organization
- Legal status: Active
- Purpose: Humanitarian aid, visiting service among the poor
- Headquarters: 40 route Eugénie, Vieux-Moulin, France
- Region served: Worldwide
- Official language: French
- Website: pointscoeur.org
- Remarks: No canonical connection to the Catholic Church since 2020

Points Cœur is a French non-governmental organization founded in 1990 by Thierry de Roucy as an international visiting service among the poor. It was associated with a Catholic ecclesiastical community of the same name, whose priestly branch was dissolved in 2017 and whose sisters' branch was dissolved in 2020. The ecclesiastical community voted to dissolve itself in 2020.

The civil association continues to operate in more than 20 countries, including a French association of the same name, but has no canonical connection to the Catholic Church. Cardinal Secretary of State Pietro Parolin confirmed this in a letter to the Bishops' Conference of France in 2023.

== History ==
Points Cœur traces its origins to January 4, 1990, when Thierry de Roucy, then Superior General of the Congregation of the Servants of Jesus and Mary, reported receiving an inner call during communal prayer at the Ourscamp Abbey in France to found small communities of young people among the poor. De Roucy described his inspiration as rooted in the spirituality of Thomas Philippe, the Dominican friar whose courses he had attended at L'Arche in Trosly-Breuil and whom he considered his spiritual father. Philippe had been subject to repeated prohibitions by the Holy Office since 1956 for sexual abuse; later investigations confirmed that he had sexually abused women in the context of spiritual direction. His intention was to offer friendship and consolation to the poor, and especially to abandoned or suffering children. In October 1994, de Roucy opened the Institut Thomas Philippe, a center for philosophical and theological formation whose students studied the works and unpublished courses of Philippe.

The first two houses were established in Argentina and Brazil in 1990 and were run by eleven volunteers. In 1992, the civil association Points Cœur was founded in France as the legal framework for the work's activities. Between 1992 and 1999, the volunteer service expanded to 15 further countries. In 1997, the first house in France was opened. In 1999, 150 volunteers from 15 countries were deployed in 20 countries.

By the time of its 28th anniversary in 2018, Points Cœur had grown to 40 houses in 26 countries and had sent more than 2,000 volunteers since its foundation. At that time, the work counted 87 consecrated lay members, 40 sisters and postulants, and 20 priests of the Molokai Fraternity. Every week, volunteers visited hospitals, prisons, orphanages and care homes in several dozen countries.

=== Founder's conviction ===
On 21 June 2011, de Roucy was convicted by the Ecclesiastical Court of Lyon of sexual abuse, abuse of power, and absolution of an accomplice. Hoyeau notes that the proceedings revealed a power structure extending beyond the sexual abuse itself: de Roucy served simultaneously as the community's superior and as confessor to its individual members, a dual role that canon law (CIC can. 984 §2) explicitly prohibits from being used in external governance. The sentence included a three-year ban from hearing confessions of Points Cœur members and an obligation to pay €60,000 in compensation to the victim. The conviction was initially protected by pontifical secrecy. On 9 April 2013, La Croix was the first national newspaper to report on the conviction. The conviction was confirmed on appeal by the ecclesiastical court of Montpellier in 2015.

In early 2016, the Bishop of Toulon Dominique Rey suspended de Roucy for disobedience after he refused to return to his diocese. The Vatican removed him from the clerical state in 2018.

=== Canonical investigations and dissolution ===
A first canonical investigation had been opened in 2005. A second investigation in 2014, led by Dominican theologian Loïc-Marie Le Bot, found serious structural problems in the movement, including an excessive centralization of authority around the founder, deficiencies in the teaching on authority and spiritual fatherhood, a tendency toward self-referentiality and mistrust toward the Church, and inadequate formation of members. Ecclesiastical commissioners were appointed to oversee reform, but Bishop Rey and the Roman authorities noted "serious dysfunctions, a number of deviations, and a profound lack of ecclesial transparency" that required deep reform — work that, in their assessment, was never completed. The Bishops' Conference of France drew attention to "the risk of seeing these structures continue under other forms, in other places, thus evading the work of refoundation and reform that was asked of them."

Points Cœur members decided to dissolve its canonical status in 2020; it continued to describe itself as a 'Catholic NGO'. On 7 August 2023, Cardinal Secretary of State Pietro Parolin wrote to the president of the Bishops' Conference of France, reporting that Points Cœur and Les Servantes de la Présence de Dieu "have no more canonical connection with the Church" despite continuing to operate as NGOs. Parolin noted that on French territory the organizations continued to present themselves as ecclesial realities — with members wearing religious dress, proposing a path of consecrated life to young people, and adopting forms of life typical of a religious community — and stated that "this attitude does not fail to cause scandal among the faithful and the victims." He instructed diocesan bishops that they "cannot in any case reconstitute the suppressed Associations, either in another form or under another name", and must ensure that, if the organizations survive as NGOs, they do not present themselves as religious communities or offer activities of an ecclesial nature.

Following the dissolution, civil associations continuing the work of Points Cœur under various names remained active in at least 23 countries (see Civil associations below).

== Former ecclesiastical branches ==
After Points-Cœur, Thierry de Roucy created three associations of priests and nuns which in 2017 had about one hundred members. All three branches were subsequently dissolved.

The Molokai Fraternity, founded in 1995, brought together seminarians and priests at the service of the Points-Cœur mission, under the name of Saint Damien of Molokai, "the Apostle of the lepers". It was dissolved by a bishop's decree of 6 July 2017, confirmed by Rome in June 2018.

Founded in 1994, the Handmaids of the Presence of God was the religious branch of Points-Cœur, bringing together women who lived the charism of Points-Cœur according to the apostolic religious state. At its height, the congregation comprised 33 sisters of 7 different nationalities, living in small communities in France, Peru, El Salvador and Argentina. It was dissolved on 8 March 2020.

The Saint-Maximilien-Kolbe Fraternity gathered lay people who lived the charism of Points-Cœur in the world, under the name of Saint Maximilian Kolbe. The private association of the faithful encompassing this and the other lay activities of Points-Cœur voted to self-dissolve on 1 April 2020.

== US affiliate ==
The US affiliate, originally incorporated as Heart's Home USA, was established in Brooklyn, New York, and was featured in The New York Times in 2012. According to tax filings, de Roucy remained listed as Chairman of the Board of Heart's Home USA as late as 2014. According to the same filings, the organization adopted the name Con-solatio in 2021.

Con-solatio sends volunteers aged 18–35 on missions of 14 to 24 months to impoverished neighborhoods in 18 countries and holds the Candid Platinum Seal of Transparency.

== Civil associations ==
Following the dissolution of the ecclesiastical community in 2020, the existing civil associations in various countries continued their work. The following table lists the known civil associations that emerged from the Points Cœur network. Information is based on various sources and may vary.

Civil associations emerging from Points Cœur
Country	Name	Website
Argentina	Puntos Corazón	puntoscorazon.org.ar
Brazil	Presença e Amizade	presencaeamizade.org
Chile	Puntos Corazón	puntoscorazon.cl
Costa Rica	Puntos Corazón	–
Ecuador	Puntos Corazón	–
El Salvador	Puntos Corazón	–
France	Points Cœur	pointscoeur.org
Germany / Austria	Offenes Herz e.V.	offenesherz.de
Greece	ΣΠΙΤΙ ΤΗΣ ΚΑΡΔΙΑΣ	–
Honduras	Puntos Corazón	–
India	Heart's Home	–
Italy	Punto Cuore	puntocuore.org (no longer active)
Japan	心の港 – Heart's Home Japan	–
Cuba	Puntos Corazón	–
Peru	Misión y Compasión	misionycompasion.org.pe
Philippines	Tahanan ng Puso	–
Poland	Domy Serca	-
Romania	Puncte Inimă	puncteinimaromania.org
Senegal	Points Cœur	–
Thailand	Points Cœur	–
Ukraine	Дім серця	–
Uruguay	Puntos Corazón	–
USA	Con-solatio	con-solatio.org
