= Marie-Hélène Mathieu =

French disability rights activist

Marie-Hélène Mathieu (born 4 July 1929) is a French disability rights activist. She is co-founder of the international movement Faith and Light; with Jean Vanier, she has dedicated her life’s work to people with disabilities and to their families and friends.

Through her testimonies, Marie-Hélène Mathieu continues to be involved in the lives of these support structures that she has created, in order to ensure that the person with a disability, irrespective of the severity, finds their unique, rightful place in society.

== Biography ==
Mathieu was born in Tournus, Saône-et-Loire.

In the 1950s, Mathieu began studying to become an éducatrice spécialisée (special needs teacher) under Father Henri Bissonnier. He was one of the few priests to consider the question of religious education for young people suffering from a mental disability, and went so far as to develop a new catechism for them. At the end of her course, Father Henri asked her to work with him, a collaboration that would last for around twenty years.

In 1956, Mathieu was elected President of the French Christian Association of special needs teachers, for whom she founded the magazine Educateurs spécialisés ("Special Needs Teachers").

In 1957, during a retreat at Chateauneuf de Galaure (in the Drôme region of France), where Father Finet was preaching, she met Marthe Robin, founder of the Foyers de Charité. Robin, who was paralysed and practically blind, was very close to children with disabilities and their families. She would become an advisor and friend to Mathieu, and her support was invaluable in the birth of the Office chrétien des personnes handicapées (OCH, "Christian Foundation for Disabled People").

In 1963 Mathieu founded the OCH. The association aims to support families, encourage a response to their distress and offer them new hope, particularly through the introduction of a permanent place of welcome and financial support for Christian associations and establishments.

In 1968, alongside the lectures and meetings, Marie-Hélène Mathieu created Ombres et Lumière (Shadows and Light), the OCH magazine aimed at people with disabilities, their families and friends.

That same year, faced with the suffering of the parents of two children with serious disabilities who had felt marginalised at Lourdes, she launched a remarkable pilgrimage to Lourdes with Jean Vanier for people with mental disabilities and their families and friends. At Easter 1971, this pilgrimage gathered together 12,000 people from 15 countries, including 400 people with a mental disability. From this extraordinary gathering, the international movement of Faith and Light was born, a movement which today numbers more than 1,508 communities in 80 countries.

In addition to OCH and Faith and Light, Mathieu was involved in creating the Simon de Cyrène Foundation for people who have suffered a severe head injury. She is also one of the founders of Relais Lumière Espérance, which is aimed at close friends and relatives of people suffering from mental illness, as well as the Groupe de liaison Saint Joseph, which twice a year brings together around twenty organisations working to found and support Christian homes for adults with mental disabilities. In the same spirit, the Pierre-François Jamet working and communion group, which she launched with Xavier Le Pichon, enables around thirty small communities to meet, and supports them in their care for people suffering from psychological distress.

Mathieu was appointed by Pope John-Paul II to the Pontifical Council for the Laity (1984 – 1989) and as an expert for the Holy See at the Council of Europe. She is the first woman to have given a Lent address at Notre-Dame de Paris (in 1988). Pope Benedict XVI appointed her auditor to the synod on the Eucharist (2005).

== Quote ==
When I was a child there was a girl in my class called Alice, who was very marginalised. One day when we had been particularly cruel and she was crying, I sensed the suffering behind her sorrowful face. I would have liked to have consoled her.... Or one day to console other people like her in their distress. Alice unwittingly guided me towards a school for special needs teachers. Through my studies I was able to meet Father Bissonnier, the pioneer of a new form of catechism adapted to people with disabilities. My work with him helped me discover, beyond appearances, the uniqueness of the individual, who is loved by God and called to share His glory. He transmitted a desire to help each person with a disability to discover their vocation, but also to support parents in their task, which is so hard and yet so beautiful. A tragic event therefore acted as the trigger. A couple who had ended the life of their child, born without arms, had been acquitted and greeted triumphantly. I was part of a general coming of awareness by kick-starting a collective work: "They have the right to live!" Immediately afterwards, I was driven to create Office chrétien des personnes handicapées so it could come to the aid of families, and I did this with the spiritual support of Marthe Robin. In 1966, my discovery of the L'Arche community helped me, in turn, to discover a new dimension in our relationship with the weakest ones. A life of contact with such people revealed a new meaning to life and profoundly changed you. "Faith and Light" would share this same spirituality through a community of alliances.

— Marie-Hélène Mathieu, book extract

== Positions ==
=== Founder ===
- 1963: Founded the Christian foundation for disabled people, of which she was Director until 1996.
- 1968: Founded the magazine Ombres et Lumière in 1968, a Christian magazine for people with disabilities, their families and friends. She held the editorship of this until 2000 and still writes a bi-monthly column.
- 1971: Founded the international Faith and Light movement with Jean Vanier, communities where people with a mental disability, their families and friends can meet. She coordinated the movement until 1990. Today, Faith and Light is present in 80 countries and has more than 50,000 members.
- 1972: Started the permanent reception service at Lourdes.
- 1982: Founded the Groupe Relais friendship and prayer group (together with Secours catholique), now known as Relais Lumière Espérance.
- 1986: Founded the Groupe de liaison Saint Joseph by request of families.
- 1992: Founded the Pierre-François Jamet Communion and working group, with Xavier Le Pichon
- 2006: Founded the Simon de Cyrène Foundation.

The current Director of the OCH is Philippe de Lachapelle. Cyril Douillet is the Editor of Ombres et Lumière, and Ghislain du Chéné is the International Coordinator of the Faith and Light movement.

=== Administrator ===
- 1956 – 1973: Secretary-General of the medico-pedagogical and psychosocial committee of the International Catholic Child Bureau (BICE)
- 1956 – 1971: President of the French National Catholic Union of Youth Special Needs Teachers (UNAEDE)
- 1972 – 1975: Vice-coordinator of L'Arche
- 1979 – 1986: Administrator of Secours catholique
- 1986 – 1983: Administrator of Radio Notre-Dame

=== Church ===
- 1984: Member of the Pontifical Council for the Laity, appointed by John Paul II.
- 1988: First woman to give an Easter address at Notre-Dame de Paris.
- 2001 – 2004: Expert for the Holy See on the subject of people with disabilities at the Council of Europe.
- 2005: Auditor at the Synod of Bishops on the Eucharist, appointed by Pope Benedict XVI. She requested that even the most profoundly disabled people be permitted to receive the Eucharist in accordance with the faith of their family or community that accompanies them.

== Publications ==
- Regular columns in the Ombres et Lumière magazine since its creation in 1968.

=== Publications ===
- La Formation religieuse des enfants malades. Paris: Éditions Fleurus. 1961. OCLC 460404883.
- Mieux vaut allumer une lampe que maudire l’obscurité [A better lamp to light with] (in French). OCH. 1981. OCLC 37745854.
- Dieu m’aime comme je suis [God loves me as I am] (in French). Saint-Paul. 1998. ISBN 9782850497322.
- La lumière d’une rencontre, Quand la personne handicapée nous fait signe [Meet at the lamp: when disabled people call out] (in French). Edifa-Mame. 2008. ISBN 9782916350462.
- Plus jamais seuls, l’aventure de Foi et Lumière [Never again alone, the adventure of Foi et Lumière] (in French). Presses de la Renaissance. 2011. ISBN 9782750906641.

=== DVDs ===
- The story of Faith and Light (2006)
- (in French) Une voix pour les sans-voix ("A voice for the voiceless") (2010)

== Honours and awards ==
- 2008: Commander of the Legion of Honour.
- 2005: Pro Ecclesia et Pontifice (Papal Medal)
- 2003: Award from the French National Academy of Education and Social Studies
- 1976: Knight of the National Order of Merit (France)

== See also ==
- Jean Vanier
