= Sue Mosteller =

Sister Sue Mosteller CSJ
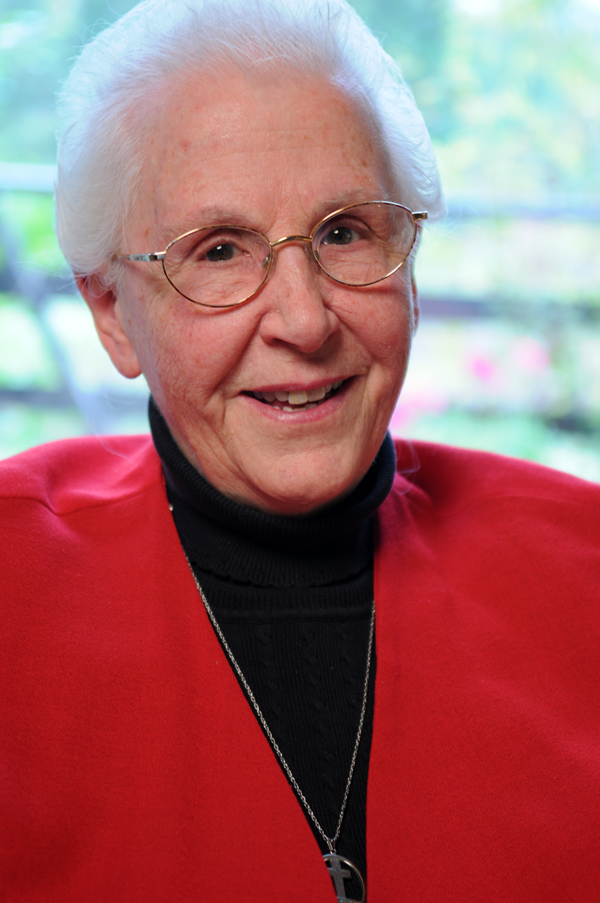

Personal life
- Born: 1933 (age 92–93)
- Education: University of Toronto

Religious life
- Religion: Roman Catholic

Sue Mosteller CSJ, OC (born 1933) is a writer and teacher who lives in Toronto, Ontario, Canada.

== Biography ==
Mosteller is a Sister of St. Joseph of Toronto. She first traveled from Ohio to board with the community and later entered the order after thriving under their supervision. She holds a degree in English from the University of Toronto and taught in schools in British Columbia and Ontario for 15 years.

Since 1971, Mosteller has been a member of the L'Arche Daybreak Community which is part of an international network of faith-based communities, founded by Jean Vanier, for those with developmental difficulties. She asked to be assigned to live and work with the community after hearing Vanier speak at the University of St. Michael's College and participating in a pilgrimage to Lourdes. She described the way he spoke about people with disabilities as a "turning point in my life". In 1976 Mosteller became L'Arche Daybreak's second Community Leader (Executive Director) and in 1985, she established Dayspring, a centre for spiritual growth, with Henri Nouwen. She lived with the L'Arche Daybreak community for 40 years, leaving in 2011 to live with a small group of sisters.

Beyond living as a member of the Daybreak community, Mosteller also held a leadership role within the wider L'Arche organization. She was the first person elected to hold the role of International Coordinator after Jean Vanier. Holding the position for nine years, Mosteller traveled extensively, assisting with the birth of new L'Arche communities in multiple countries. During her time in the position the L'Arche network expanded from 30 to 65 global communities.

Mosteller was a colleague and close friend of Father Henri Nouwen when he lived at L'Arche Daybreak (1986 - 1996). Nouwen credited her with being instrumental in fostering a maturity in his spirituality. As he states in his book The Return of the Prodigal Son, Mosteller "opened up the third phase of my spiritual journey. […] Her words struck me like a thunderbolt." When Nouwen died in 1996, he entrusted Mosteller with his estate, making her the literary executrix of his works. She went on to oversee the founding of the Henri J.M. Archives and Research Collection at the John M. Kelly Library, University of St. Michael's College in Toronto.

Mosteller works as Trustee for the Henri Nouwen Legacy and continues to be a member of L'Arche Daybreak. Additionally, Mosteller lectures and gives retreats around the world. She currently lives in Toronto.

On November 5, 2011, Mosteller received an Honorary Doctorate from Tyndale University College and Seminary in Toronto in recognition of her "lifelong commitment to sharing the love of God with many of society's marginalized people and her significant contributions to Christian life and learning over several decades".

On December 27, 2019 she was honoured in the New Year's appointments to the Order of Canada as an Officer of the Order.

== Books ==
Mosteller has written three books. Her first book, My Brother, My Sister, is about Jean Vanier and Mother Teresa. Her second book, Body Broken, Body Blessed, is a collection of stories from L'Arche. Her third book, Light Through the Crack, is her own story and the stories of people she has accompanied over the years.

- Mosteller, Sue (2006). Light Through the Crack: Life After Loss. Doubleday. pp. xii, 156 p., 21 cm. ISBN 978-0-385-51667-9.
- Mosteller, Sue (1998). A place to hold my shaky heart : reflections from life in community. Body broken, body blessed. New York: Crossroad Pub. Co. pp. 127 p. : ill., 19 cm. ISBN 0-8245-1763-6.
- Mosteller, Sue (1972). My brother, my sister. Toronto: Griffin House. pp. 117 p. ill. 26 cm. ISBN 0-88760-035-2.
