= Thomas Philippe =

French Catholic priest (1905–1993)

The Reverend Thomas Philippe OP
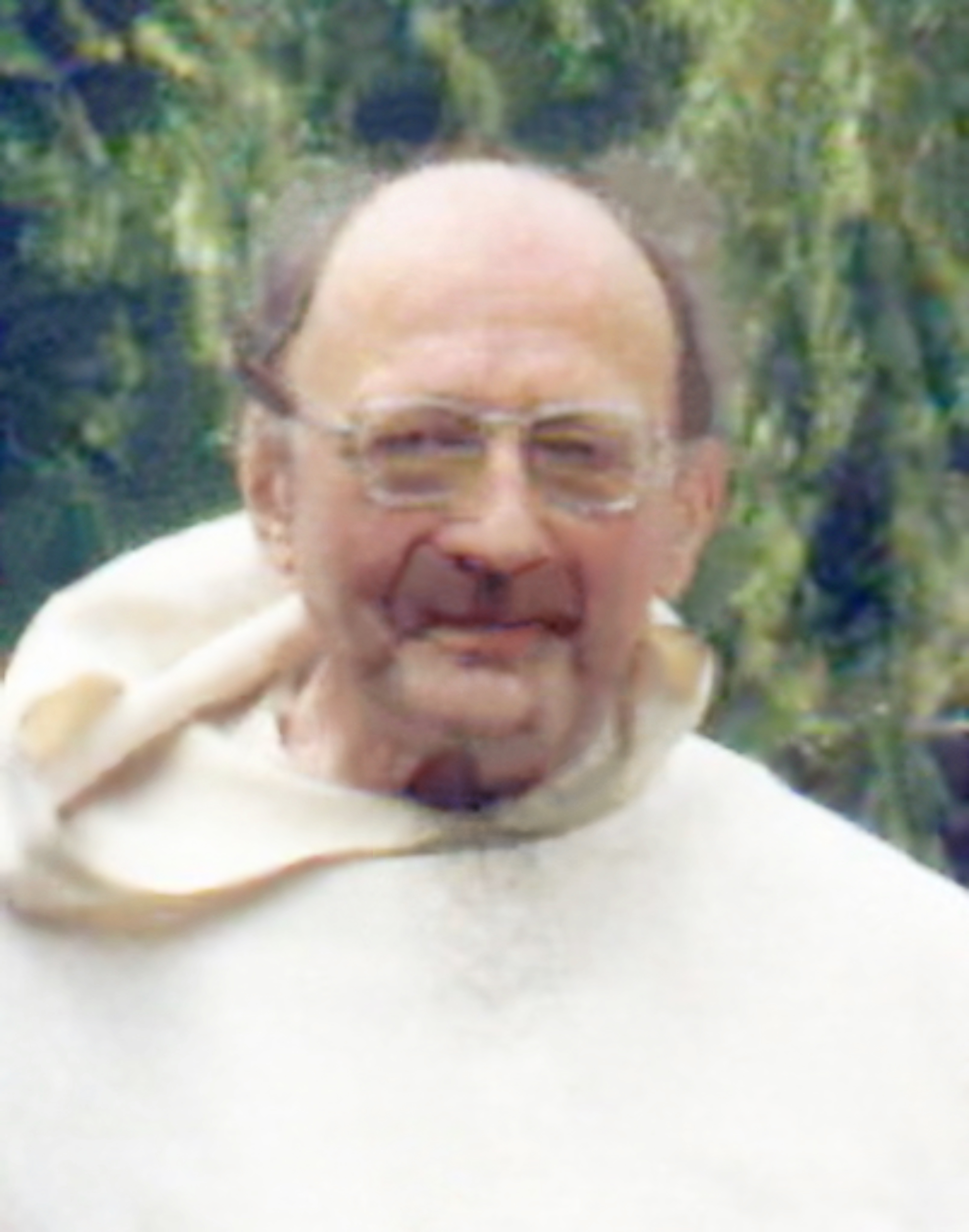
- Thomas Philippe in 1986
- Born: Jean Marie Joseph Philippe; 18 March 1905; Cysoing, Nord, France
- Died: 4 February 1993 (aged 87); Saint-Jodard, Loire, France
- Occupation: Priest
- Known for: Co-founder of L'Arche
- Parent(s): Henri Ignace Louis Joseph Philippe (father, 1875–1959) and Élisabeth Marie Joseph Dehau (mother, 1878–1968)
- Relatives: Marie-Dominique Philippe (brother), Marthe Robin, and Marie Philippe
- Religion: Catholic
- Ordained: 25 July 1929 at Le Saulchoir, Kain, Belgium

Jean Marie Joseph Philippe, OP (18 March 1905 – 4 February 1993), professionally known as Thomas Philippe, was a French Dominican priest. Along with Jean Vanier, he co-founded L'Arche, an organisation supporting people with mental disabilities. Both he and Vanier were later found to have engaged in sexual abuse.

Alongside teaching theology and philosophy, Philippe oversaw spiritual retreats (at which his sexual abuses took place) and gave spiritual direction.

== Biography ==
Philippe was the third of twelve children born to Henri Ignace Louis Joseph Philippe (1875–1959) and Élisabeth Marie Joseph Dehau (1878–1968). The Philippes were distantly related to French mystic Marthe Robin. Elisabeth's brother Pierre Dehau, a Dominican, lived with the family and acted as tutor to the children. Eight of the children later entered religious life, with five of them, including Philippe and his brother Marie-Dominique Philippe, joining the Dominicans. Philippe was ordained a priest in 1929, taking the name Pere Thomas.

In 1938, he had a so-called "spiritual experience" at Rome while contemplating the painting of Mater Admirabilis, which was the beginning of a process whereby he developed a heterodox and sexually abusive theology based on "Marian Maximalism". This was developed from a premise that Jesus and his mother Mary had been in an incestuous sexual relationship.

He taught theology at Le Saulchoir and at the Pontifical University of Saint Thomas Aquinas in Rome, before starting various religious communities, including L'Eau Vive (living water). It was through the L'Eau Vive community in 1950 that Phillipe met Jean Vanier and founded L'Arche in 1964. Vanier called Philippe his "spiritual father". In 1963, Thomas was the chaplain for Val Fleuri (flowered valley), a community of men with mental disabilities in Trosly-Breuil. Val Fleuri was later integrated into L'Arche.

His conversations with Tim Guénard led to Guénard's conversion to Catholicism.

Philippe died on 4 February 1993 at the priory of Saint-Jodard, where the Brothers of Saint John looked after him in his old age. His brother Marie-Dominique discovered him dead and later celebrated his funeral in Trosly-Breuil, where he was buried.

== Strife at Le Saulchoir ==
Paul Weindling, in his 2010 book, said:

Thomas Philippe ... inspired vibrant spirituality and social activism, standing in the Dominican tradition of saving souls through preaching while looking to the very earliest Christian communities.
...
Père Thomas clashed with the philosophically innovative Père Marie-Dominique Chenu, who was Régent of Studies at the Studium Generale of Le Saulchoir from 1932 until debunked in 1942. ... In 1937 Chenu's tract Une école de théologie: Le Saulchoir was condemned for challenging papal authority and split the ranks of the Thomists at the Saulchoir. ... The Angelicum in Rome ordered young Père Thomas "to put things right" by debunking Père Chenu. ... Thomas Philippe ousted Chenu as Régent at Le Saulchoir in June 1942. ... Chenu's condemnation meant his fellow Dominicans resented Père Thomas, who tried to bring about a fusion of the metaphysical and the mystical, but he realized that he could not change the rank and file at Le Saulchoir, who were loyal to Chenu.

== Sexual abuse of adult women ==
Thomas Philippe and his brother Marie-Dominique Philippe (also a priest) were accused of having sexual relations with several women over a period of more than 20 years.

In the early 1950s, after complaints from two women, Philippe was ordered to leave the L'Eau Vive center and travel to Rome for a canonical investigation. Following this investigation, in 1956 the Vatican forbade Philippe to exercise any priestly ministry and in particular spiritual guidance, due to Philippe's teaching of false mysticism and associated deviant sexual practices. Dominican archives show that Philippe ignored this prohibition. Although the Vatican dissolved L'Eau Vive, Philippe continued to run it clandestinely through his protégé Jean Vanier. The two men later formed L'Arche at Trosly-Breuil and Philippe resumed his priestly activities, including the spiritual direction of men and women.

In 2015, a second canonical instruction validated by Pierre d'Ornellas, Archbishop of Rennes, stated that Philippe was guilty of sexual abuse in the context of spiritual guidance of adult women. According to this document, fourteen people (two witnesses and twelve victims) were heard, confirming the facts of abuse which took place from the 1970s until 1991. The document states: “Father Thomas committed sexual acts against adult women, by which he said to seek and communicate a mystical experience ... They attest to a psychological and spiritual hold on these women whom he asked for silence because, according to him, this corresponded to special graces 'that no one could understand.'" The canonical investigation confirmed that these testimonies were trustworthy.

In early 2016, the association Aid to Victims of Deviant Religious Movements in Europe and their Families (AVREF) published the testimony of a former Carmelite nun, who recounted in detail the story of her sexual relationship with Philippe. The publication of this first testimony prompted two other women to testify to AVREF in turn a few weeks later, explicitly confirming that Philippe also had sexual relations with them.

The L'Arche community recognized the truth of the facts and published them on the L'Arche international website. Several nuns - victims of the sexual abuse of Phillipe and his brother - testified in a documentary broadcast on Arte and on Radio Télévision Suisse (RTS).

In February 2020, L'Arche International issued its Summary Report, being a summary of the full report by GCPS Consulting (a UK-based group with expertise in the prevention of sexual exploitation and abuse) and the historical work by Antoine Mourges, concerning alleged or proven sexual abuse of women by Thomas Philippe and Jean Vanier.

A defense of Thomas Philippe and Marie-Dominique Philippe has been published online by their niece Marie Philippe.

== Books ==
=== In English ===
- Philippe, Thomas; Shaw, Russell (1979). Church & state: a novel of politics and power. Our Sunday Visitor. ISBN 9780879736491. 384 pages.
- The Fire of Contemplation: A Guide for Interior Souls, translated and edited by sister Verda Clare Doran, CSC. New York, Alba House, 1981.
- Philippe, Thomas (10 August 2009) [1990]. O'Connor, Edward Dennis (ed.). The Contemplative Life. Translated by Buonaiuto, Carmine (2nd ed.). CreateSpace Independent Publishing Platform. ISBN 9781448658435. Forewords by Henri J. M. Nouwen and Jean Vanier. 144 pages.
- Philippe, Thomas (1995) [1993]. Mystical Rose: Mary, Paradigm of the Religious Life. Our Sunday Visitor. ISBN 9780879736491. OCLC 32859232. 175 pages.

=== In French ===
- Prayer, 1974.
- The Heart of God, the Heart of Man, Trosly-Breuil, Les Chemins de l'Arche-la Ferme, 1987, 204 p.
- The wheat is already white for the harvest: the Lion of Judah at the heart of a new community, Paris, Le Sarment / Fayard / Éditions du Lion de Juda, 1987, 207 p.
- Fidelity to the Holy Spirit, Nouan-le-Fuzelier, Éditions du Lion de Juda, 1988, 281 p.
- Crumbs for all: advice for the interior life and prayer of the heart, Paris, Éditions Saint-Paul, 1994, 219 p.
- The quarter of an hour of prayer, Paris, Éditions Saint-Paul, 1994, 31 p.
- Philippe, Thomas (2008) [1994]. Une nouvelle maturité chez nos aînés [A new maturity for our seniors] (in French). Paris: Saint-Paul éditions religieuses. ISBN 9782351170373. 31 pages.
- Paths of light in children, Paris, Éditions Saint-Paul, 1994, 31 p.
- The awakening to the love of the little one, Paris, Éditions Saint-Paul, 1994, 31 p.

=== In Polish ===
- Wytrwała modlitwa, 1992.
- Wierność Duchowi Świętemu, 1994.
- Drogi światła u dziecka, 1998.
- Nowa dojrzałość u najstarszych, 1998.
- Czas żywotnych sił u nastolatka, 1998.
- Mądrość różańca, 2002.
- Obieram Cię dzisiaj, Maryjo, 2002.
- Okruchy: rady dotyczące życia wewnetrznego i modlitwy serca, 2002.

== See also ==
- Religieuses abusées, l'autre scandale de l'Église
