= World Down Syndrome Day =

Annual awareness day on March 21

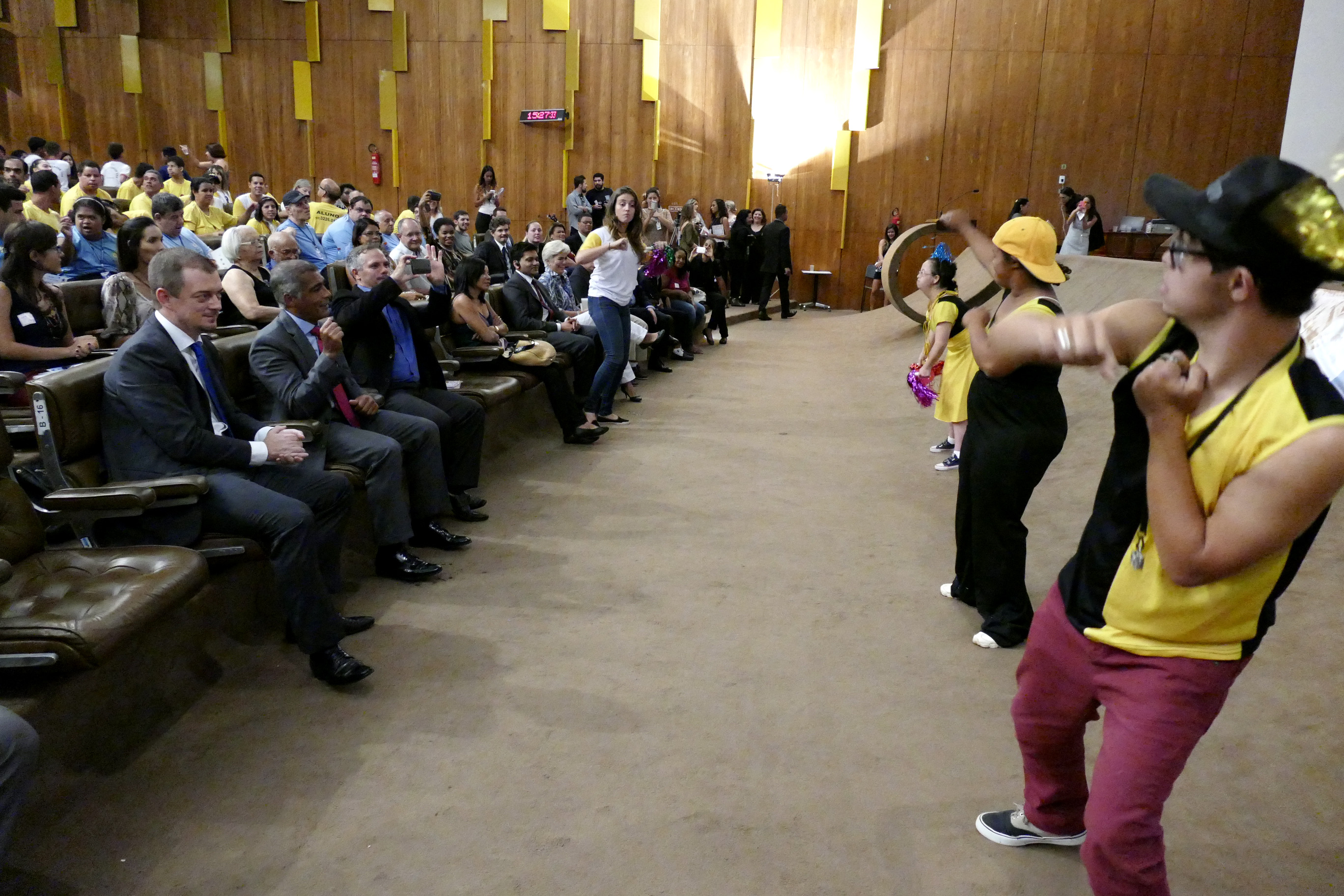
A World Down Syndrome Day celebration in Brazil

World Down Syndrome Day (WDSD) is marked each year on March 21, beginning in 2007. The 21st day of March (the 3rd month of the year) was selected to signify the uniqueness of the triplication (trisomy) of the 21st chromosome which causes Down syndrome. The General Assembly of the United Nations has decided to observe it each year since 2012.

Every year on March 21, World Down Syndrome Day is observed to create awareness about Down syndrome. It is a condition in which a child is born with an extra 21st chromosome.

== Activities and commemorations ==
A common activity is wearing colorful or mismatched socks, to show support for people with Down syndrome. Socks are shaped somewhat like chromosomes.

An animated short, Freebird, was created to recognize World Down Syndrome Day in 2021. The film, written and directed by Michael Joseph McDonald, was set to the song, "Freedom" by Jordan Hart, and won the Chicago International Children's Film Festival in 2021.
