= Freebird (2021 film) =

2021 Canadian 2D animated short film

- Promotional release poster
- Directed by: Michael Joseph McDonald; Joe Bluhm; Nicholas Herd (creative director)
- Written by: Michael Joseph McDonald; Joe Bluhm
- Produced by: Michael Joseph McDonald; Jennifer Nadeau; Mariana Duran
- Music by: Jordan Hart
- Animation by: Guillaume Blackburn; Celia Bullwinkell; Malcolm Sutherland
- Production companies: Tonic DNA; L'Arche
- Distributed by: L'Arche
- Release date: March 21, 2021; (on World Down Syndrome Day)
- Running time: 5 minutes
- Language: English

Freebird is a 2021 Canadian 2D animated short film written and directed by Michael Joseph McDonald and Joe Bluhm, and co-led by creative director Nicholas Herd. The plot follows Jon, a boy with Down syndrome, navigating the world with a loving mother, an absent father, and a life-long crush. Forty-five years of Jon's life are depicted in five minutes with no dialogue. The film is a joint production between Tonic DNA and L’Arche, featuring original music by Jordan Hart.

The short was revealed on World Down Syndrome Day, March 21, 2021. Following its release, the film received the 1st Prize award at the 38th Chicago International Children's Film Festival, making it an Oscar contender for the 94th Academy Awards.

== Plot ==
Jon helps his elderly mother into an armchair and goes to make her tea. When he returns, she is asleep with an open photo album on her lap. Atop the photos is a note written on a napkin: You were right. He's perfect.

In a flashback to the 1970s, Jon is an ultrasound on a screen. A beautiful woman is glowing. Her husband is overjoyed. The nurse hands the young couple a pamphlet entitled Institution. The husband cannot handle raising a child with an intellectual disability. He walks away from his wife and unborn child. Despite the heartbreak caused by her ex-husband, she gives birth to a baby boy with Down syndrome named Jon.

Jon's earliest years are marked by good and bad memories with his mother: chasing a butterfly, burying a dead goldfish, splashing dishwater, getting ready for bedtime, and etcetera.

In school, bullies flick a rubber band at the back of Jon's head. At recess, Jon is fidgeting with the rubber band. A girl with Down syndrome named Miranda approaches him smiling. She guides his hand towards her arm, offering herself the rubber band and turning it into a wristband. Now during class, Jon turns all the bullies’ rubber bands into wristbands for Miranda.

Jon has a not-so-secret crush on Miranda for several years. In their senior year of high school, Jon runs for student president. His flyers say: "...are you DOWN?" His biggest supporter, Miranda, holds a sign that says, "I’m Down."

At graduation, Jon waves at his teary-eyed mother. His mother looks over to her left. A man she once knew is older and missing some hair, but it's him — Jon's father. He offers his ex-wife a sad smile.

Jon walks up onto the stage and pauses. He then rips open the front of his gown to reveal a superhero crest that says I'm Down. Everyone cheers — everyone but Jon's father. His son's success in life overwhelms him.

After graduation, Jon removes Miranda's green wristband and twists it into a ring as a wedding proposal. While Jon and Miranda have the first dance at their wedding, Jon's Dad hands his mother a note written on a drink napkin: “You were right. He’s perfect”.

It's the present now, and forty-five-year-old Jon doesn't know what to make of the napkin. He shows it to Miranda. Neither of them knows where the note came from, but the message is clear. Jon lovingly wraps his sleeping mother in a blanket and turns off the light.

== Music ==
Jordan Hart composed the music for Freebird, the song "Freedom" was released on March 12, 2021.

No.	Title	Length
1.	"Freedom"	4:21
Total length:		4:21

== Reception ==
=== Critical reception ===
CBC’s Shauna Powers called it "groundbreaking" adding that it was "the first time we’re seeing Down syndrome celebrated so beautifully in animation."

Dan Sarto of Animation World Network described the short as "powerful" and "touching" stating that "the powerful film challenges the misconceptions surrounding Down Syndrome by asking the question, "Why does the world assume that a disabled life is not profoundly beautiful."

After watching the short, Stashmedia.TV advised, "grab a tissue or six...guaranteed to have you in tears by minute one."

Amid Amidi of Cartoon Brew said the film depicts Down syndrome in a positive light as it "moved away from problematic notions of pity and fear" and listed Freebird as a contender for the 2022 Oscars.

Clayton Davis, the Film Awards Editor at Variety, chose Freebird as a "Top 5 contender" in his 2022 Oscar Prediction list. In a Q&A with the directors, Animation editor-in-chief Ramin Zahed called Freebird "one of the best animations of the year."

Richard Propes of The Independent Critic described Freebird as "nothing short of exquisite." He added "As a film journalist with a disability, in my case spina bifida/paraplegia/amputee who also works in the field of disability, I can assure you that the disabled life is, indeed, quite beautiful and "Freebird" captures it all to perfection."

=== Accolades ===
As of Dec 2021, Freebird has won several awards, including:

Year	Award	Category	Result	Ref.
2021	Chicago International Children's Film Festival	Professional Jury Prize for Best Animated Short	Won	
2021	San Diego International Film Festival	Best Animation	Won	
2021	Vancouver Island Short Film Festival	Best Original Music	Won	
2021	The IndieFest Film Awards	Award of Excellence Special Mention - Disability Issues	Won	
2021	One-reeler Competition	Best Screenplay	Won	
2021	Toronto Independent Film Festival of Cift	Best Canadian Short	Won	
2021	Spark Animation	Best Music	Won	
2022	Cleveland International Film Festival	The Spalding and Jackson Award	Won	
