= Henri Nouwen =

Dutch Catholic priest and writer (1932–1996)

The Reverend Henri Nouwen
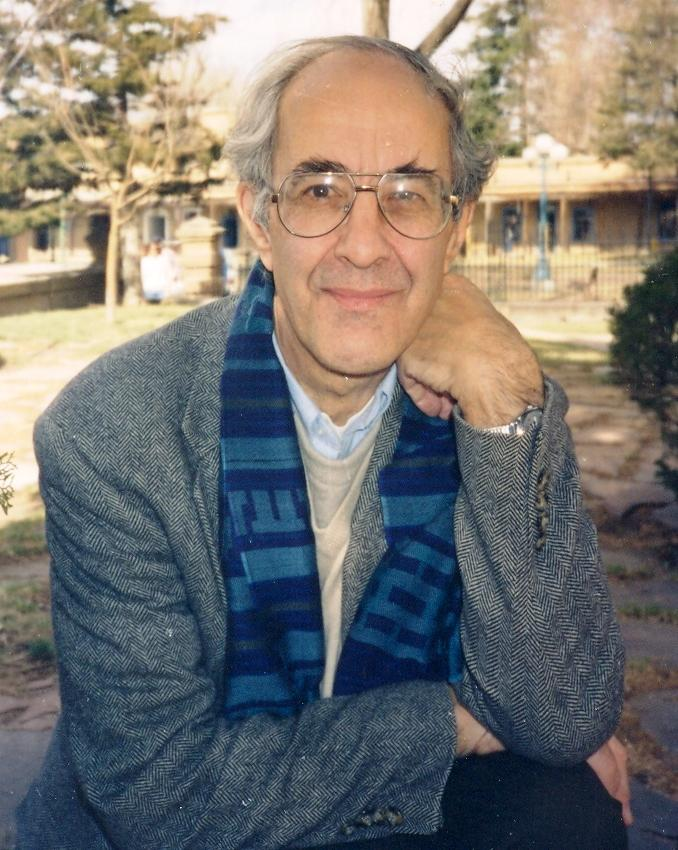
- Portrait of Nouwen in the 1990s taken by Frank Hamilton
- Born: Henri Jozef Machiel Nouwen; January 24, 1932; Nijkerk, Netherlands
- Died: September 21, 1996 (aged 64); Hilversum, Netherlands
- Resting place: St. John's Cemetery Richmond Hill, Ontario, Canada

Signature
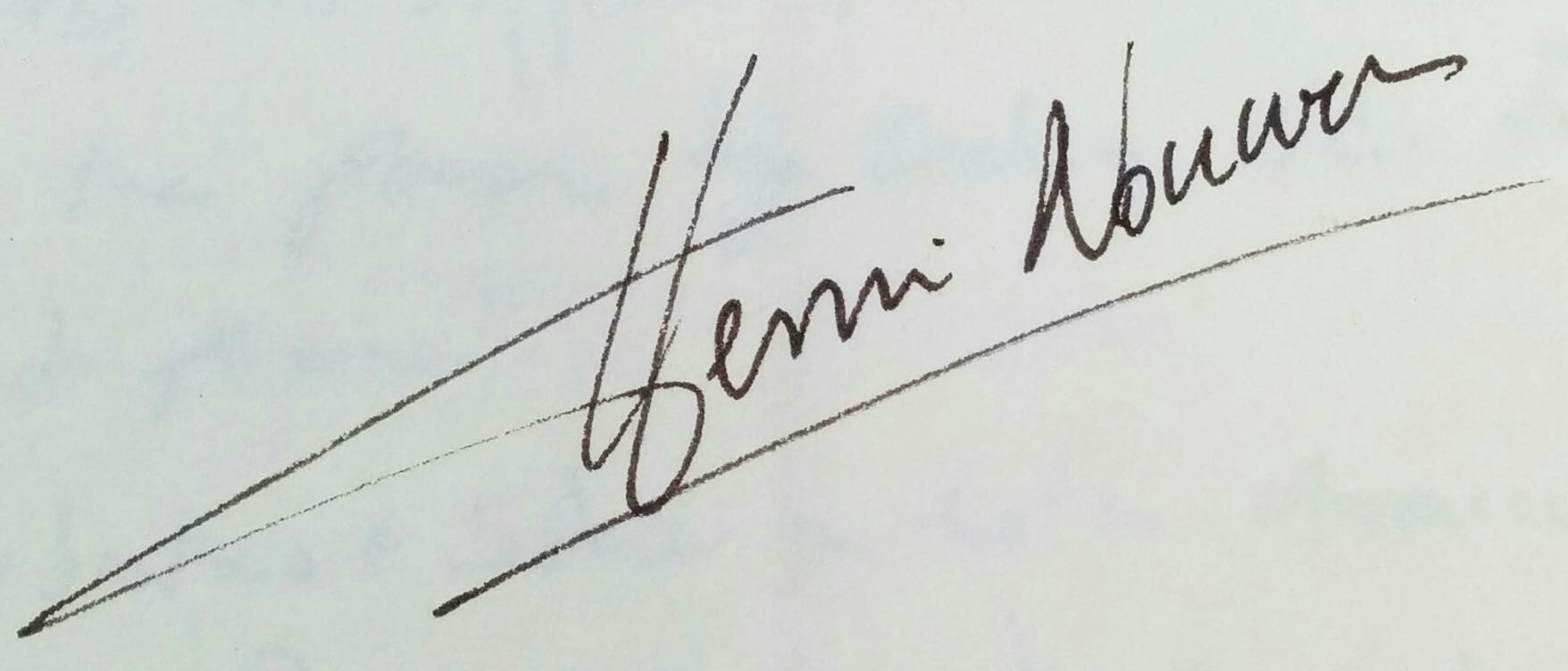

Henri Jozef Machiel Nouwen (January 24, 1932 – September 21, 1996) was a Dutch Catholic priest, professor, writer and theologian. His interests were rooted primarily in psychology, pastoral ministry, spirituality, social justice and community. Over the course of his life, Nouwen was heavily influenced by the work of Anton Boisen, Thomas Merton, Rembrandt, Vincent van Gogh, and Jean Vanier.

After nearly two decades of teaching at academic institutions including the University of Notre Dame, Yale Divinity School and Harvard Divinity School, Nouwen went on to work with people with intellectual and developmental disabilities at the L'Arche Daybreak community in Richmond Hill, Ontario.

== Biography ==
=== Early life ===
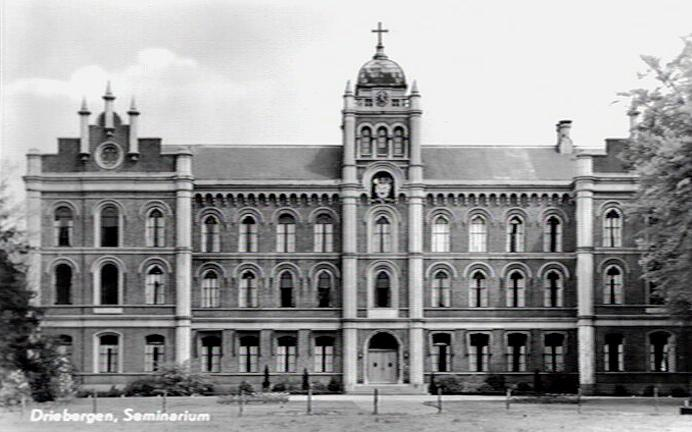
Major seminary in Rijsenburg

Henri Nouwen was born in Nijkerk, the Netherlands on January 24, 1932. He was the oldest of four children born to Laurent J. M. Nouwen and Maria Nouwen (née Ramselaar). Nouwen's father was a tax lawyer and his mother worked as a bookkeeper for her family's business in Amersfoort. His younger brother Paul Nouwen was a prominent Dutch businessman and his uncle Toon Ramselaar was a Catholic priest in the Archdiocese of Utrecht and a co-founder of the Service International de Documentation Judéo-Chrétienne. Nouwen studied at the Jesuit Aloysius College in The Hague before spending a year at the minor seminary in Apeldoorn. His year at the school was spent preparing for six years of study for the priesthood, consisting of training in philosophy and theology, at the major seminary in Rijsenburg.

=== Priesthood ===
Nouwen was ordained a Catholic priest for the Archdiocese of Utrecht on July 21, 1957, by Bernardus Alfrink at St. Catherine's Cathedral in Utrecht. Eager to learn more about himself and the people he counseled, Nouwen requested permission from Alfrink to study psychology instead of theology. His request was granted and from 1957 to 1964 he studied at the Catholic University of Nijmegen. In studying the fundamentals of clinical psychology, Nouwen struggled with the lack of interdisciplinary analysis. He sought to use psychology as a means of exploring the human side of faith which he felt was being overlooked, from a pastoral standpoint, in broader theological discussions. During his studies at the university, he was greatly influenced by Han Fortmann, a Dutch psychologist of religion whose writing about action and contemplation in a busy world are mirrored in Nouwen's own work. For his thesis work, Nouwen focused on Anton Boisen, an American minister credited with founding the clinical pastoral education movement. The thesis was not approved due to a lack of scientific analysis and clinical study. Rather than revising the work to obtain a doctorate, Nouwen completed his studies in 1964 by obtaining a doctorandus degree.

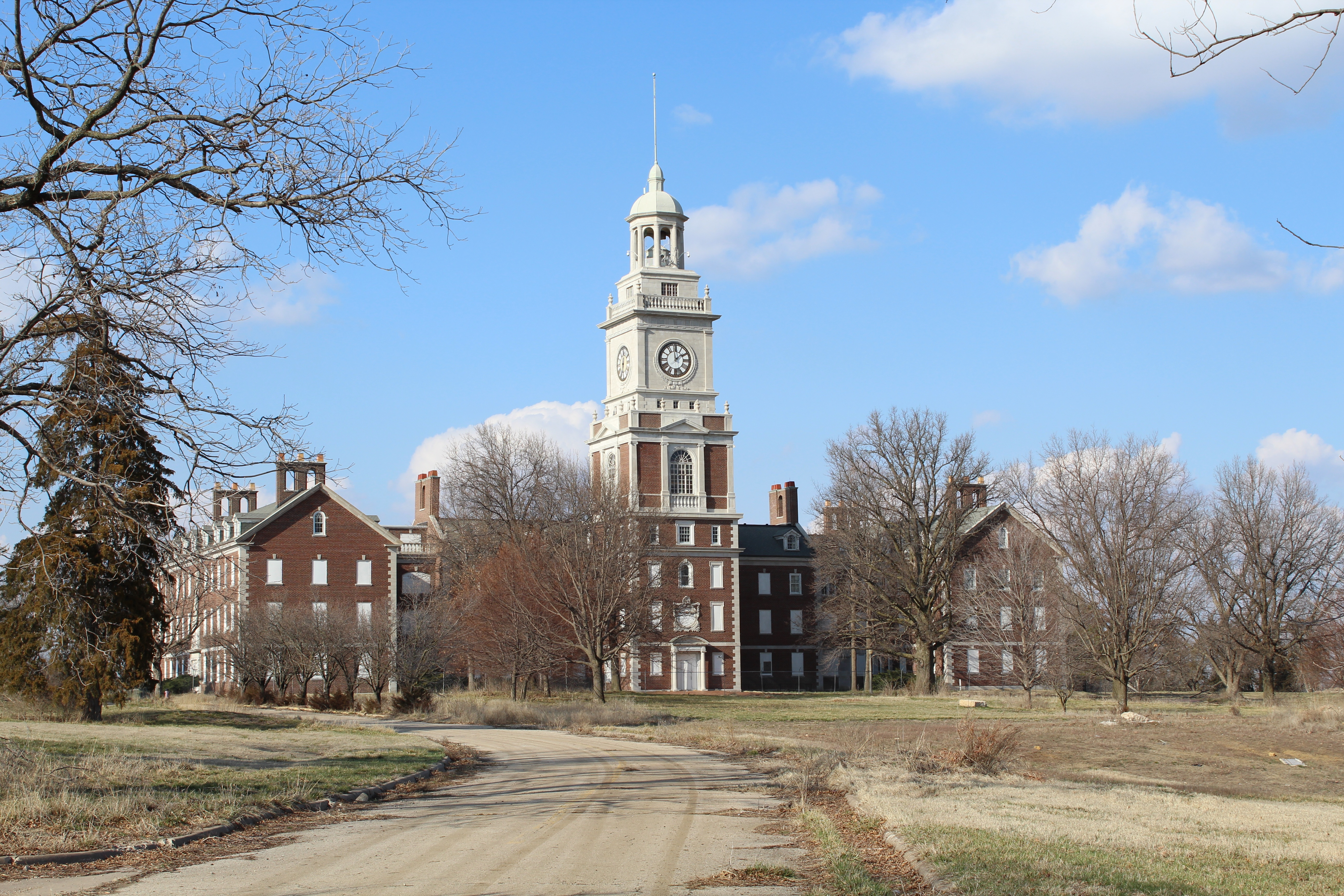
The Menninger Clock Tower

After receiving his "doctorandus", Nouwen studied for two years as a Fellow in the Religion and Psychiatry Program at the Menninger Clinic in Topeka, Kansas, and was influenced by psychologist Gordon Allport. Nouwen completed his clinical pastoral training at the Topeka State Hospital and graduated from the Menninger Foundation's training program in theology and psychiatric theory on June 19, 1965. During his time at the Clinic he found he preferred direct contact with patients over the more scientific and medical analysis of certain branches of psychology. This prompted an examination of his professional practice in order to better integrate spiritual ministry with modern psychology. Over the course of this same period, Nouwen began to engage with social and political happenings, including the Civil Rights Movement. In 1965 he traveled to the Southern United States to participate in, and later publish an article about, the Selma to Montgomery marches.

From 1966 to 1968 he was a visiting professor at the University of Notre Dame. From 1968 to 1970 he worked at the Amsterdam Joint Pastoral Institute and taught psychology and spirituality at the Catholic Theological University of Utrecht. In 1971 he received his doctorandus degree in theology.

Between 1971 and 1981 Nouwen was a professor of pastoral theology at Yale Divinity School, where he began to establish a broad readership of his work as a contributor to various publications including the National Catholic Reporter and as the author of several books based on personal experience. During his time at Yale, Nouwen took several sabbaticals, some of which informed his writing. In 1976 he was a Fellow at the Collegeville Institute for Ecumenical and Cultural Research at Saint John's Abbey, Collegeville, Minnesota, and in 1978 he was scholar-in-residence at the Pontifical North American College in Rome.

While a professor at Yale Nouwen also spent several months at the Abbey of the Genesee. His first visit began on June 1, 1974, and lasted seven months. While there he kept a journal that was published as Genesee Diary: Report from a Trappist Monastery in 1976. He returned again in 1979, after the death of his mother, which led to the publication of A Cry For Mercy: Prayers from the Genesee. Though Nouwen concluded he was not suited for Trappist life, the Abbey of the Genesee and his relationship with then abbott John Eudes Bamberger continued to be of great importance to him. The Abbey served as his home base for more than a year after he resigned from Yale and it was where he chose to celebrate the 25th anniversary of his ordination as a priest on August 6, 1982.

After leaving Yale in 1981, Nouwen took a six-month trip to South America visiting Bolivia and Peru. Upon his return to the United States in 1983, Nouwen was appointed at the Harvard Divinity School as Professor of Divinity and Horace De Y. Lentz Lecturer. The half-time appointment allowed Nouwen to split his time between teaching at the Divinity School and working with a theological center in Latin America. Nouwen taught at the school until his resignation in 1985. In 1985 and 1986 he spent nine months with the L'Arche community in France.

=== L'Arche ===
Nouwen's spirituality was greatly influenced by his friendship with Jean Vanier. The two men met while Nouwen was teaching at Harvard. Vanier sensed how lost Nouwen was feeling and invited him to visit Trosly-Breuil. Nouwen visited Vanier at the French community, the first in the L'Arche network, twice before returning in 1985 for a nine-month residency. The stay helped Nouwen find a purpose that had been missing. As Robert A. Jonas explains: "Henri had always wondered what a Eucharistically centered community would be like, and now he had found one at L'Arche."

During Nouwen's time in France he traveled to Toronto, Ontario, to officiate at a wedding and sought permission to stay for a week at L'Arche Daybreak in Richmond Hill. While there a core member named Raymond was hit by a car and left in critical condition. Nouwen provided spiritual guidance to the community and Raymond’s family, ultimately helping to reconcile the community and the family, who partially blamed Daybreak for Raymond's injuries. Nouwen's intervention had such an impact that the Daybreak members asked him to serve as their pastor. Nouwen accepted and moved in the fall of 1986 to L'Arche Daybreak, where he would spend the last ten years of his life.

While at Daybreak Nouwen was paired with Adam Arnett, a core member at L'Arche Daybreak with profound developmental disabilities. "It is I, not Adam, who gets the main benefit from our friendship," Nouwen insisted. Nouwen wrote about his relationship with Arnett in a book entitled Adam: God's Beloved.

== Personal life ==
=== Sexuality ===
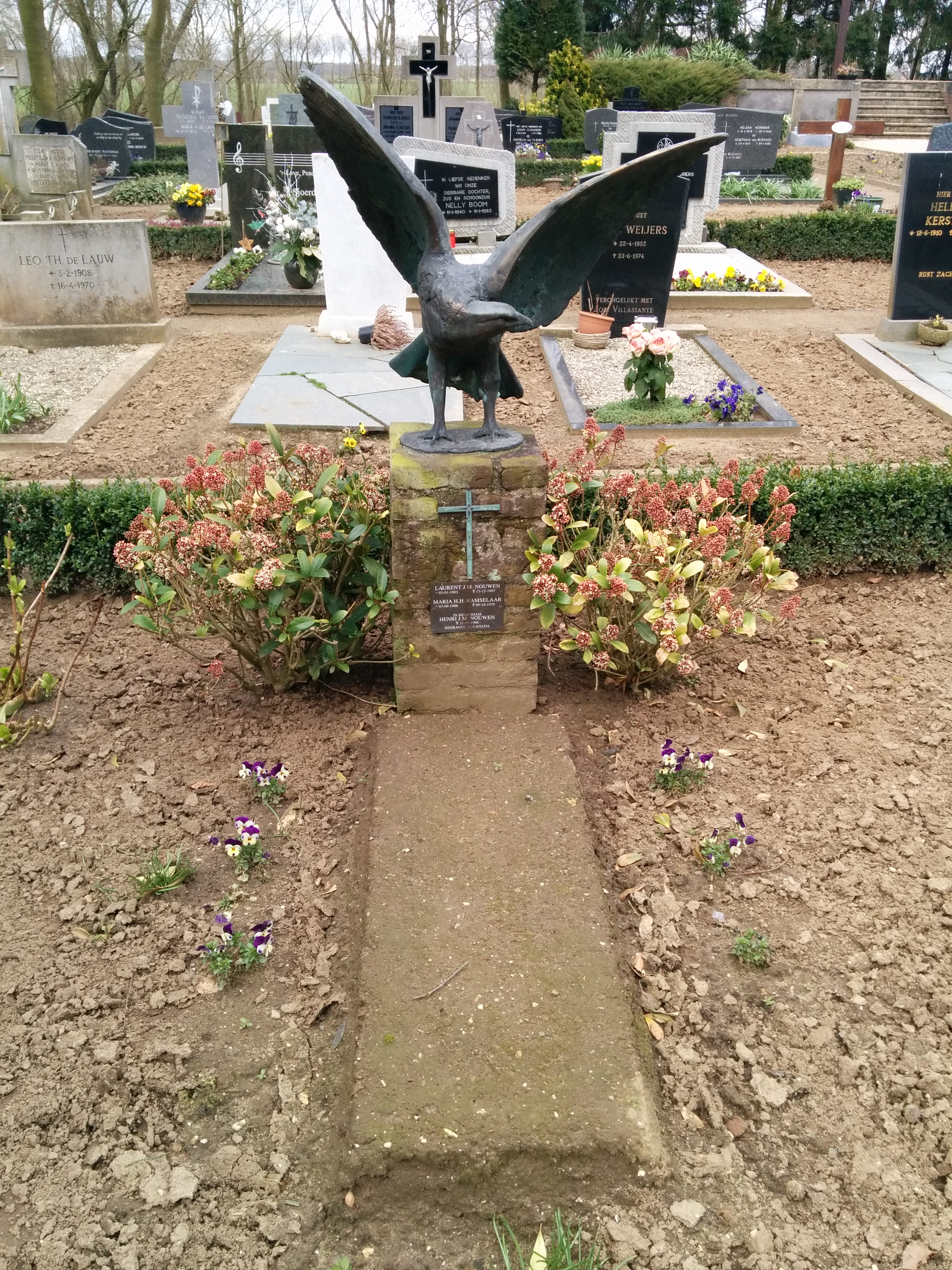
Geysteren, NL memorial

Nouwen struggled with his sexuality, which may have contributed to his feelings of self-doubt. Although this struggle was known by those close to him, Nouwen never publicly identified himself as homosexual. In his book The Return of the Prodigal Son, Nouwen describes a friendship that had him under a spell, did him no good and when it finally collapsed left him in a depressive mood and in search of self-esteem and acceptance by others.

Biographer Michael Ford referenced these instances in the biography Wounded Prophet, which was published after Nouwen's death. Ford suggests that Nouwen only became fully comfortable with his sexual orientation in the last few years of his life, and that Nouwen's depression was caused, in part, by the conflict between his priestly promise of celibacy and the sense of loneliness and longing for intimacy that he experienced. Ford writes that it took an "enormous emotional, spiritual and physical toll on his life and may have contributed to his early death." While his struggle to reconcile his priestly vow of chastity with his human desire for physical and emotional intimacy appears in his writings, there is no evidence that Nouwen ever broke his promise of celibacy.

== Death and legacy ==
Nouwen died in the Netherlands on September 21, 1996, from a sudden heart attack, while en route to Russia to participate in a Dutch documentary about his book The Return of the Prodigal Son. Nouwen's first funeral Mass was held on September 24 at St. Catherine's Cathedral in Utrecht with a eulogy offered by Jean Vanier, after which Nouwen's body was flown to Canada for burial by the L'Arche Daybreak community. The second funeral Mass was held on September 28 at the Slovak Catholic Cathedral of the Transfiguration in Markham, Ontario, following a full-day wake at St. Mary Immaculate Catholic Church in Richmond Hill on September 27. Nouwen was laid to rest in a pine coffin built in L'Arche Daybreak's The Woodery and colourfully painted by members of the community. He is buried in St. John's Anglican Church Cemetery in Richmond Hill in keeping with his desire to be near the graves of other Daybreak community members. There is also a memorial marker for Nouwen in Geysteren at the grave site of his parents.

Prior to his death, Nouwen trusted Sue Mosteller with his estate, making her the literary executrix of his works. The founding of the Henri J.M. Nouwen Archives and Research Collection at the John M. Kelly Library, University of St. Michael's College, was the culmination of Mosteller's effort to centralize Nouwen's personal records. The work involved organizing his material at L'Arche Daybreak, which included personal correspondence, original manuscripts, and audio visual material, and negotiating with the Yale Divinity School Library for the release of records Nouwen had begun depositing there as a faculty member in 1975. The Nouwen Archives opened in September 2000.

He has an award named for him, the Henri Nouwen Leadership Award, given out by the American Association on Intellectual and Developmental Disabilities, Religion and Spirituality Division. There is an endowed lectureship in Classical Christian Spirituality named after him at Drew University. There is also an elementary school named after him in Richmond Hill, Ontario.

== Writing ==
"Terugkeer van de Verloren Zoon" by Rembrandt Harmenszoon van Rijn. Nouwen wrote a short book, The Return of the Prodigal Son, based on his contemplation of Rembrandt's painting of the same name.

Before his death Nouwen published 39 books and authored hundreds of articles. His books have sold over 7 million copies worldwide and have been published in more than 30 languages. In a magazine survey conducted by Christian Century in 2003 Nouwen's work was indicated as a first choice of authors for Catholic and mainline Protestant clergy. His books include The Wounded Healer, In the Name of Jesus, Clowning in Rome, The Life of the Beloved and The Way of the Heart, along with what is recognized as one of his most popular books, The Return of the Prodigal Son.

While visiting the L'Arche Trosly-Breuil community in France, he saw a poster of Rembrandt's painting The Return of the Prodigal Son that made a deep impression on him. He decided to see the painting personally and traveled to Saint Petersburg (Leningrad at that time) to visit the Hermitage Museum where it is kept. This resulted in a several-day contemplation of the painting, which prompted him to write a book of the same name. The Return of the Prodigal Son was ranked number 66 on a list of 100 best Christian books compiled by the Church Times in 2014.

=== Themes ===
Nouwen was known to suffer from loneliness and a need for interpersonal connection, which he wrote about openly. His popularity as a spiritual guide has been linked to his capacity to describe his personal struggles in a relatable manner. He credited his approach to an interest in the daily life of people and his own journey with Christian life:

I wanted to know how we could integrate the life of Christ in our daily concerns. I was always trying to articulate what I was dealing with. I thought that if it was very deep, it might also be something other people were struggling with. It was based on the idea that what is most personal might be the more universal.

One of Nouwen's major ongoing themes involved his struggle reconciling his depression with his Christian faith. His most famous work on this topic is the Inner Voice of Love, his diary from December 1987 to June 1988 during one of his most serious bouts with clinical depression. Nouwen also explored this theme in Return of the Prodigal Son, describing love and forgiveness as unconditional. In the book, he invites the reader to follow him in his personal return to the spiritual fountains and in a parallel meditation on all the characters of the parable, their rendering by Rembrandt, and the painter's personal life.

Nouwen also wrote several essays on the necessity of peacemaking. He used God's Love as a justification for the preservation of life, as well as for his opposition to both the ongoing Cold War and the intervention of the United States in Vietnam. This was of a piece with his conviction of the oneness of all peoples under God:

To pray, that is, to listen to the voice of the One who calls us the "beloved", is to learn that that voice excludes no one. Where I dwell, God dwells with me and where God dwells with me I find all my sisters and brothers. And so intimacy with God and solidarity with all people are two aspects of dwelling in the present moment that can never be separated.

== Public speaking ==
Nouwen was a frequent public speaker. In addition to his teaching responsibilities, he traveled extensively leading retreats and preaching. With a distinct accent and animated speaking style, Nouwen was known for his engaging and expressive style of communication. The experience of seeing him preach has been compared to being at the theater or seeing a musical conductor at work. It was not uncommon for Nouwen to enthusiastically jump around or wave his arms and hands during speaking events and classroom lectures. Bob Massie describes the experience of watching Nouwen speak in Befriending Life (2001): "His squeezing, tugging gestures made it look like he was striving to milk meaning directly out of the air. He would point his fingers down and rotate his wrists as though trying to stir a separate little pot with each digit."

Nouwen appealed to many audiences, including Anglicans and evangelicals because of his Jesus-centered spirituality. In 1992 he was invited by Robert H. Schuller to preach on Hour of Power at the Crystal Cathedral in Garden Grove, California. Nouwen appeared over three consecutive Sundays and preached on the topic of belovedness. Recordings of his appearance were later used by Schuller as a model for preaching when instructing new ministers.

== Prizes ==
- Christopher Award (1984) for Gracias!
- Thomas Merton Award (1985)
- Ronald McDonald House Charities Award of Excellence (1996)
- Emmausprisen (2002)

== Works about Nouwen ==
=== Books ===
- Bengtson, Jonathan; Earnshaw, Gabrielle, eds. (2006). Turning the wheel : Henri Nouwen and our search for God. Maryknoll, NY.: Orbis Books. OCLC 123485283.
- Beumer, Jurjen (1997). Henri Nouwen : a restless seeking for God. New York: Crossroad Pub. Co. ISBN 9780824517687. OCLC 36573627.
- de Vinck, Christopher, ed. (1999). Nouwen then : personal reflections on Henri. Grand Rapids, Mich.: Zondervan. ISBN 9780310224624.
- Ford, Michael (1999). Wounded Prophet : A Portrait of Henri J.M. Nouwen. New York: Doubleday. ISBN 9780385493727.
- Hernandez, Wil (2006). Henri Nouwen: A Spirituality of Imperfection. New York: Paulist Press. ISBN 9780809144341. OCLC 70673257.
- Higgins, Michael W.; Burns, Kevin (2012). Genius Born of Anguish: The Life & Legacy of Henri Nouwen. Toronto, Ontario, Canada: Novalis. ISBN 9780809147854.
- Jonas, Robert A., ed. Henri Nouwen: Writings Selected With an Introduction by Jonas. Maryknoll, NY: Orbis Books, 1998. ISBN 1-57075-197-8
- Jonas, Robert A., ed. The Essential Henri Nouwen. Boulder, CO: Shambhala Publications, 2009. ISBN 978-1-59030-664-2
- LaNoue, Deirdre (2000). The Spiritual Legacy of Henri Nouwen (1st ed.). New York: Continuum. ISBN 9780826412836. OCLC 44469051.
- O'Laughlin, Michael (2004). God's Beloved : A Spiritual Biography of Henri Nouwen (1st ed.). Maryknoll, N.Y.: Orbis Books. ISBN 9781570755613. OCLC 54806408.
- O'Laughlin, Michael (2005). Henri Nouwen: His Life and Vision (1st ed.). Maryknoll, N.Y.: Orbis Books. ISBN 9781570758225. OCLC 60705527.
- Porter, Beth; Brown, Susan M.S; Coulter, Philip, eds. (June 26, 2001). Befriending Life: Encounters with Henri Nouwen. Doubleday. ISBN 978-0-385-50202-3.
- Twomey, Gerald S.; Pomerleau, Claude, eds. (2006). Remembering Henri : the life and legacy of Henri Nouwen. Maryknoll, NY.: Orbis Books. OCLC 68220900.
- Wan, Milton Wan-yiu (1999). The Spirituality of Liberation: Social Justice and Contemplative Prayer (in Chinese). Hong Kong: Christian Excellence Mission.
- Darton, Longman & Todd Ltd, (1994) The Return of the Prodigal Son: A story of Homecoming. ISBN 978-0-232-52078-1
- Random House Inc, (1979) Wounded Healer: Ministry in Contemporary Society. ISBN 978-0-385-14803-0
- SanFran. (April 22, 1981). Henri Nouwen: Intimacy. ISBN 978-0-06-066323-0

=== Articles and essays ===
- Callahan, Annice (1992). "Prophet of conversion / Henri Nouwen (1932- )". Spiritual guides for today : Evelyn Underhill, Dorothy Day, Karl Rahner, Simone Weil, Thomas Merton, Henri Nouwen. New York: Crossroad. pp. 176. ISBN 9780824511098.
- Smith III, James D. (2006). "Christian spirituality envisioned : a pastoral appreciation of Ernst Kitzinger, Margaret Miles, and Henri Nouwen (Harvard, 1976-85)". In Richard Valantasis; Deborah J. Haynes; James D. Smith III; et al. (eds.). The subjective eye : essays in culture, religion, and gender in honor of Margaret R. Miles. Pickwick Publications. OCLC 70277239.
- Trenn, Thaddeus J. (September 2006). "Science and the Mystery of the Human Person" (PDF). Journal of the American Scientific Affiliation. 58 (3): 216–224.

=== Documentary ===
By Windborne Productions, and starring Susan Sarandon, Journey of the Heart: The Life of Henri Nouwen. The documentary featured enlightening dialogue with Nouwen, captured merely a year prior to his death. Interviews conducted with significant acquaintances, distinguished colleagues, and family members contributed to the comprehensive portrayal of Nouwen's unwavering faith - a person characterized by fervor and empathy.

=== Play ===
Commissioned by the Henri Nouwen Society in autumn 2019, Murray Watts wrote The Beloved Son, an eight-actor play whose premier took place at the Sheen Centre, New York. In January 2024, actor Andrew Harrison performed a one-man adaptation of the play at St Luke's, Upper Holloway.

== See also ==
- Frederick Buechner
- C. S. Lewis
