= L'Arche =

International non-profit housing the intellectually disabled

- Founded: August 4, 1964; 62 years ago
- Founded at: Trosly-Breuil, France
- Type: Non-governmental
- Legal status: Non-profit
- Purpose: To build a world where people with and without intellectual disabilities are friends and equals.
- Headquarters: Paris, France
- Region served: 37 countries
- Services: Faith-based community living, housing, programs, employment, empowerment, and support networks
- Members: 10,000+
- Leader: Sylvain Brabant (interim)
- Key people: Jean Vanier/Raphaël Simi/Phillippe Seux, founders
- Website: www.larche.org

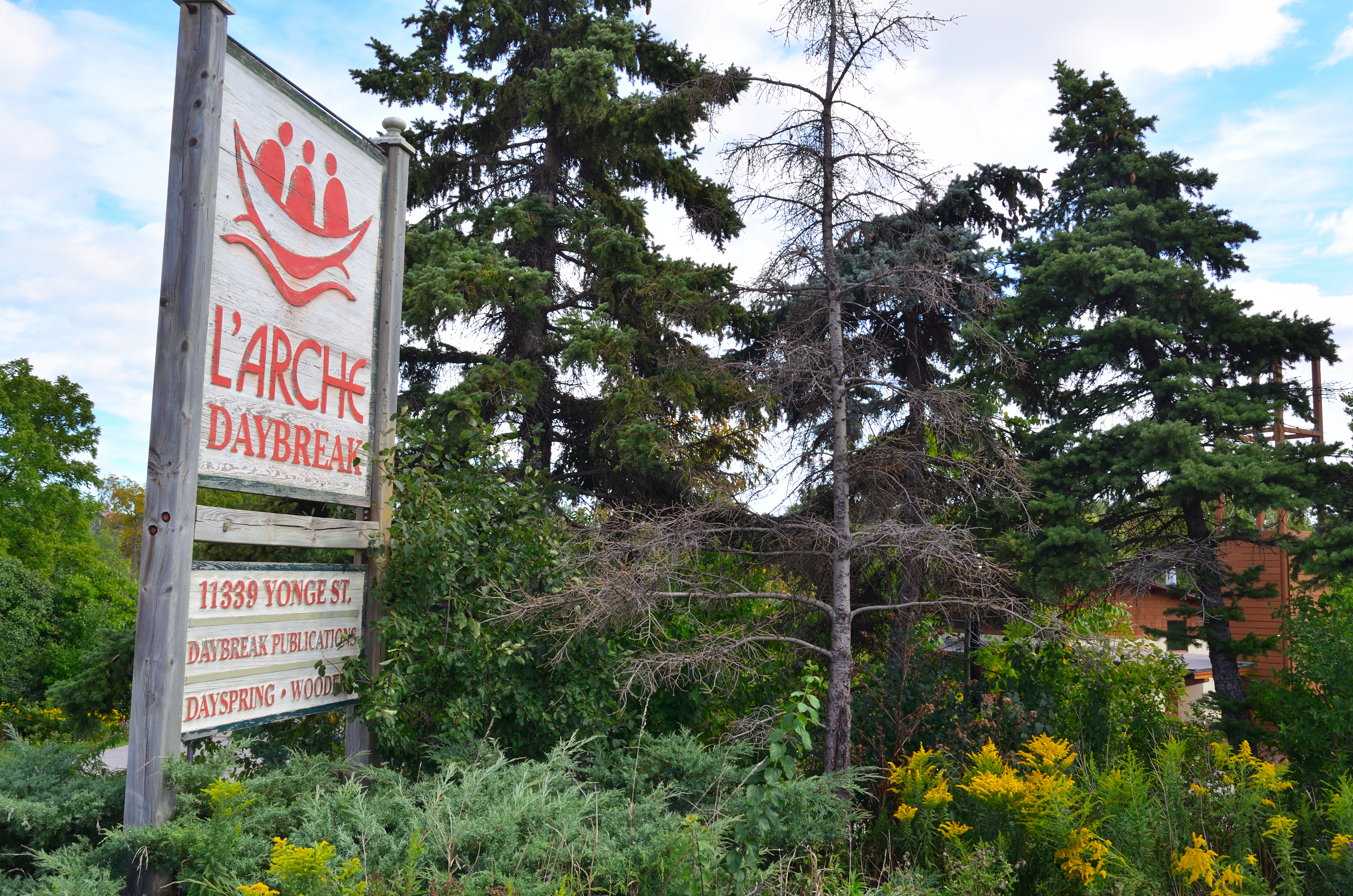
L'Arche Daybreak

L'Arche (French for "The Ark") is an international federation of communities in which people with and without intellectual disabilities live and work together. Founded in 1964 in Trosly-Breuil, France, L'Arche developed from a single household into a federation of approximately 160 established communities in 37 countries on six continents.

L’Arche emerged as an alternative to the segregation of people with intellectual disabilities in large institutions. It developed not only as a form of community-based support but as an intentional community in which people with and without intellectual disabilities share ordinary life. Its model seeks to move beyond a strictly one-way distinction between caregiver and care recipient: although members have different support needs and responsibilities, L’Arche holds that each person can give and receive care and that relationships can transform everyone involved. Contemporary communities combine this emphasis on shared life with residential support, employment, social enterprise, family programs and other services.

Originally rooted in Roman Catholic Christianity, L'Arche became ecumenical and later increasingly inter-religious and culturally diverse as it expanded internationally. Its communities remain united by a common charter while adapting their religious practices and organizational forms to local contexts.

L'Arche has been influential in Christian spirituality and disability theology and has also attracted attention in disability studies, anthropology, and social policy. Scholars have particularly examined the organization's emphasis on mutuality, interdependence and belonging, sometimes contrasting it with disability-rights traditions emphasizing autonomy and independent living. Since the early 21st century, the federation has increasingly incorporated the language and practices of disability rights, supported decision-making, participation and the leadership of people with intellectual disabilities.

== History ==
=== Origins ===
L'Arche was established in August 1964 in the village of Trosly-Breuil in northern France. Jean Vanier, a Canadian former naval officer and philosophy lecturer, invited three men who had been living in institutions (Raphaël Simi, Philippe Seux, and a third man identified in published accounts only as Dany) to share a small house with him. Dany returned to the institution shortly afterward, while Simi and Seux remained in what became the first L'Arche community.

The initiative took shape in response to the institutional segregation of people with intellectual disabilities. Vanier's early critique concerned not only the restrictions imposed by large hospitals and asylums but the isolation, impersonality and social rejection experienced by people living within them. L'Arche developed around a different premise: that people with intellectual disabilities should live in ordinary households, form lasting relationships and participate in the work and decisions of community life. Its model treated care not simply as a service provided to disabled people but as a relationship in which people with and without disabilities could affect and learn from one another.

The first community expanded rapidly. In 1965 L'Arche incorporated the nearby Val Fleuri residence, bringing the community to approximately 50 residents across two homes. The number of residents around Trosly-Breuil increased to 73 by 1968, 112 by 1970 and 125 by 1972, while additional homes opened in nearby Cuise, Breuil and Compiègne. The growth also encountered local resistance, including opposition from some residents of Trosly to increasing number of people with intellectual disabilities living in the village.

As additional people joined the community, L'Arche developed a distinction between people with intellectual disabilities, later commonly called "core members", and "assistants", who lived or worked alongside them and provided practical support. The model sought to blur the conventional division between caregiver and care recipient by emphasizing relationships and reciprocal dependence.

=== International expansion ===
The first L'Arche community outside France was L'Arche Daybreak, established in Richmond Hill, Ontario, in 1969. Canada subsequently became one of the movement's largest national federations.

In 1970, L'Arche expanded to Bangalore, India, under the name Asha Niketan, meaning "House of Welcome." The community included both Christians and Hindus, marking an early departure from the predominantly Catholic character of the first French communities. As L'Arche subsequently expanded into countries with different religious traditions, this experience contributed to the federation's increasingly ecumenical and interreligious identity.

In 1971, Jean Vanier and Marie-Hélène Mathieu organized a large inclusive pilgrimage to Lourdes that marked an important stage in L'Arche's early international development. The initiative responded to the experience of Gérard and Camille Proffit, whose sons Loïc and Thaddée had intellectual disabilities. After being refused admission to a diocesan pilgrimage, the Proffit family traveled to Lourdes independently. There, the only hotel willing to accommodate them required the family to eat in their room rather than with other guests. Held at Easter, the inclusive pilgrimage brought together 12,000 people from 15 countries, including 4,000 people with intellectual disabilities, connecting families, supporters and emerging communities across national boundaries. Groups formed in preparation continued meeting afterward, becoming the basis of Faith and Light, an international movement organizationally distinct from, but closely associated with, L’Arche. The international relationships created through the pilgrimage also supported L’Arche’s expansion during the following decade.

At the first Federation Meeting in 1972, participating communities adopted an International Charter and created an International Council, establishing structures for coordination among the growing number of communities. The first community in the United States was established in Erie, Pennsylvania, in 1972. L'Arche was established in the United Kingdom the following year, where physician Thérèse Vanier, Jean Vanier's sister, played an important role in its early development.

As the number of communities increased, international leadership became less centered on Jean Vanier. In 1975, Sue Mosteller, a member of L'Arche Daybreak, succeeded him as international coordinator. The International Federation of L'Arche was formally constituted in 1978.

During the 1970s, 45 new L'Arche communities were established across 14 countries. Expansion continued during the 1980s, when 43 additional communities were established, including the first L'Arche communities in Spain, Italy, Mexico, Brazil, Germany, and the Philippines. In Poland, a community was established clandestinely at Śledziejowice in 1981, three months before the declaration of martial law; it received legal recognition only in 1989. During the 1990s, 16 additional communities were established, including the first in Syria, Uganda, Zimbabwe and the Netherlands. During the 2000s, another 25 communities were established, including the first L'Arche communities in Egypt, Ukraine, Bangladesh, Croatia, and Argentina.

International expansion also increased the cultural and religious diversity of the federation. Communities developed within different local contexts while remaining connected through the International Federation and its Charter; the federation's governing documents emphasize both subsidiarity and adaptation to different cultures.

By its fiftieth anniversary in 2014, L'Arche comprised 146 communities in 35 countries. As of 2026 L'Arche International reported 160 established communities in 37 countries.

=== Disability voice, rights and leadership ===
The public voice of people with intellectual disabilities has been a recurring theme in L'Arche, although its meaning has changed over time. Jean-Pierre Crépieux, who joined the first community in 1964, participated in reflection and decisions concerning community life and later challenged accounts that treated people with intellectual disabilities as passive recipients of L'Arche's founding, writing that Jean Vanier could not have founded it "without us." Crépieux later published an autobiographical account of his life in L'Arche. Communities also developed forms of authorship that did not depend on conventional literacy; L'Arche resident René Hocquaux, who could neither read nor write, produced the images for a published Chemin de Croix in collaboration with Vanier and artist Miwako Ota.

Historically, L'Arche often described people with intellectual disabilities as possessing gifts and insights capable of transforming others. During the late 20th and early 21st centuries, this emphasis on voice and relationship increasingly intersected with disability-rights approaches emphasizing self-determination, legal capacity, self-advocacy and control over decisions affecting one's own life. The federation's 2023 Charter emphasizes shared responsibility and decision-making by people with and without intellectual disabilities.

National and international initiatives have increasingly sought to translate participation into organizational and public influence. L'Arche Australia's National Listening and Speaking Group contributes to national planning and decisions, while L'Arche Canada has developed leadership training and designated roles for people with intellectual disabilities in national initiatives. The EU-supported TwidSA project has trained young people with and without intellectual disabilities in France, Croatia, Palestine and Egypt in self-advocacy, citizenship and leadership.

=== Investigation of Jean Vanier and institutional response ===
Jean Vanier, L’Arche’s founder and longtime public face, died in 2019. In February 2020, L’Arche International published the findings of an independent inquiry that received consistent testimony from six adult women without intellectual disabilities. The inquiry concluded that Vanier had initiated manipulative and emotionally abusive sexual relationships with them, generally in the context of spiritual accompaniment, between 1970 and 2005. It also found that Vanier had long known about, and participated in, abusive practices associated with his spiritual mentor, the Dominican priest Thomas Philippe.

L’Arche subsequently commissioned an independent interdisciplinary Study Commission to investigate the origins and extent of these practices. Its report, published in January 2023 following archival research and 119 interviews with 89 people, described a secretive sectarian network organized around Philippe’s mystical-sexual doctrines. The commission identified at least 25 women without intellectual disabilities who had experienced sexual contact with Vanier as part of relationships characterized by confusion, control and abuse.

The commission found no evidence that people with intellectual disabilities had been subjected to these practices or that the abusive practices had spread within L’Arche beyond the narrow group based at Trosly-Breuil. It nevertheless concluded that this group had operated as a secretive microsystem within the original L’Arche community.

L’Arche International accepted the findings, condemned the actions of Vanier and Philippe, apologized for the organization’s failure to identify and stop the abuse, and established an independent listening service and a mechanism through which survivors could seek reparations. The organization also announced expanded safeguarding measures, including regular audits and training across the federation.

== Community model ==
L’Arche combines an intentional-community model with, in many countries, the provision of regulated disability services. Its distinctive aim is not only to support people with intellectual disabilities in the wider community but to create a shared community in which care, friendship, work, celebration and decision-making form part of ordinary life.

Members with intellectual disabilities commonly receive practical support from assistants, but L’Arche does not describe the relationship as entirely one-directional. Its stated ideal is one of mutuality, in which every member can contribute to the community and both give and receive care. People with intellectual disabilities are therefore described as “core members,” emphasizing their place at the center of community life rather than defining them as clients or patients.

Underlying this model is a critique of self-sufficiency as the measure of a successful human life. L’Arche’s writings treat vulnerability, dependence and the need to belong as universal human conditions rather than characteristics confined to disabled people. Within this understanding, assistants may possess greater practical abilities and institutional authority while also being encouraged to question their own self-sufficiency and recognize their dependence on others.

Researchers have consequently described L’Arche as a form of moral formation as well as care. Pamela Cushing found that assistants were socialized into a different understanding of disability and caregiving, while Lorraine McCrary described community life as “caring among”: reciprocal care joined to participation in decisions about the common good. Patrick McKearney similarly observed that L’Arche attempts to make the caregiving relationship itself a place of intimacy, responsibility and social belonging rather than treating professional support merely as a means of achieving inclusion elsewhere.

=== Belonging, empowerment and interdependence ===
The tension between community and empowerment was examined by researchers Katherine McDonald and Christopher Keys. They observed that L'Arche creates unusually strong social relationships and a sense of belonging for people who have often experienced exclusion, while also raising questions about whether tightly integrated communities always maximize individual autonomy. Their analysis argued that community and empowerment need not be opposites but that maintaining both requires attention to power within relationships.

Anthropologist Patrick McKearney has examined L'Arche as a form of "domestic citizenship," arguing that dependence on other people need not exclude someone from social or political membership. Through ethnographic research, he suggested that L'Arche challenges assumptions that citizenship and autonomy require independence from intimate care. Other researchers have similarly compared L'Arche's emphasis on interdependence with the Independent Living Movement, which historically resisted paternalistic systems of care and emphasized disabled people's control over their own lives.

The resulting debate concerns a larger question in disability studies: whether freedom is best understood primarily as independence from others or whether forms of chosen interdependence and reciprocal care can themselves be conditions of citizenship and agency.

Researchers have also cautioned that the language of mutuality does not eliminate differences in authority. Assistants and organizational leaders may control resources, personal support and institutional decisions even when relationships are described as friendships. Academic critiques of L'Arche have therefore examined paternalism, religious authority, the idealization of vulnerability and the difficulty of reconciling communal ideals with the self-determination of individual members.

=== Spiritual and religious identity ===
L'Arche originated within Roman Catholic Christianity but was never constituted as a religious order. Its early philosophy was strongly shaped by Catholic understandings of community, human dignity, vulnerability and the Gospel, and religious practice became central to many early communities.

As L'Arche expanded, its religious character became more diverse. Communities were founded in Protestant, Orthodox, Hindu, Muslim and religiously plural societies, and people with no religious affiliation also became members. Asha Niketan in India was explicitly multi-faith from its early years.

L'Arche today describes itself as having Christian roots while welcoming people of different faiths and people without religious belief. Spiritual practices vary substantially among communities and countries.

L'Arche has had particular influence within disability theology, a field that examines how disability challenges theological conceptions of human nature, dependence, personhood and community. Scholars including Hans Reinders, Thomas Reynolds, Stanley Hauerwas, and others have engaged ideas closely associated with L'Arche, particularly friendship with people with profound intellectual disabilities and critiques of human worth based on rational capacity, productivity or independence.

L'Arche's influence also extended beyond disability theology into broader Christian spirituality, particularly through the work of Dutch Catholic priest and spiritual writer Henri Nouwen. After academic appointments at institutions including Yale and Harvard, Nouwen joined L'Arche Daybreak in Canada in 1986 and remained associated with the community until his death in 1996. His experiences at Daybreak became central to books including Road to Daybreak (1988) and Adam: God's Beloved (1997), through which L'Arche's ideas about relationship, vulnerability and human worth reached audiences well beyond the movement itself.

== Organization and governance ==
L'Arche is organized as an international federation rather than as a single centralized provider of disability services. Individual communities are the fundamental units of the federation and generally operate as legally distinct organizations under the laws of their respective countries. Communities in countries with substantial L'Arche networks are commonly organized within national structures, while communities in countries without national federations receive more direct support from L'Arche International. Local communities differ significantly in their sources of funding, regulation, employment structures, and services.

The International Federation Assembly is the federation's highest deliberative body and meets periodically to approve major decisions concerning its charter, mandate, and international leadership. Confirmed communities have voting rights within the assembly. International leadership and an International Stewardship Board exercise responsibilities between assemblies, with the Stewardship Board responsible for financial and legal oversight under French law. L'Arche's governing documents call for participation by people with and without intellectual disabilities. In several countries the organization has developed initiatives specifically intended to increase the involvement of people with intellectual disabilities in consultation, governance, and leadership.

== Funding ==
Funding arrangements differ substantially among L'Arche communities because disability services are financed differently across countries. Some communities receive much of their income through government funding or contracts for residential care and disability-support services, while others rely largely or entirely on donations, fundraising, grants and income generated through community activities.

L'Arche International also provides financial and organizational support to communities in lower-income countries and to communities operating without established national structures.

== Advocacy and public engagement ==
L'Arche International received special consultative status with the United Nations Economic and Social Council in 2015. It subsequently participated in UN discussions concerning implementation of the Convention on the Rights of Persons with Disabilities, including through delegations to the Conference of States Parties to the convention. National and local L'Arche organizations have also advocated concerning community living, deinstitutionalization, legal capacity and participation in public life.

In Lithuania, L'Arche member Edita Daugėlaitė pursued a multiyear legal effort to restore legal capacity that had been removed when she was twenty-five. After two unsuccessful attempts, a Kaunas court ruled in 2022 that her incapacity should be removed in most areas, while retaining a limited restriction concerning property relations. Lithuanian disability-rights advocates characterized the decision as an important demonstration of how supported decision-making could help implement Article 12 of the Convention on the Rights of Persons with Disabilities.

Beginning in 2009, L'Arche en France organized a series of four public conferences under the title Fragilités interdites ?, bringing experiences of disability and vulnerability into dialogue with philosophy, science, economics and public life. Participants included psychoanalyst Julia Kristeva, geneticist Axel Kahn and philosophers Michela Marzano and Patrick Viveret, alongside senior figures from government, civil society and business. The final conference, held in Paris in 2016 with more than 1,350 participants, extended the discussion to economic and corporate life, with executives from Michelin, Société Générale and Groupe Armor examining whether vulnerability—often treated as incompatible with performance and competitiveness—could instead be a resource for organizations and collective life.

L'Arche organizations have also used theatre, film and storytelling as forms of public engagement. L'Arche Toronto's Sol Express performing-arts program collaborated with institutional survivors and Jumblies Theatre to create Birds Make Me Think About Freedom. Combining theatre, dance, music, poetry, and projected images, the production explored the institutionalization of people with intellectual disabilities and received a Patron's Pick award at the 2018 Toronto Fringe Festival.

L’Arche International’s twelve-episode As I Am documentary series, begun in 2014 and directed by Michael Joseph McDonald, developed films collaboratively with people with intellectual disabilities in communities around the world. L'Arche Canada later produced Freebird (2021), an animated short challenging common representations of Down syndrome, with Canadian actor and disability advocate Nicholas Herd serving as creative director. In the United States, L'Arche Atlanta partnered with the Georgia Council on Developmental Disabilities on 6,000 Waiting (2021), which formed part of a broader campaign concerning Georgia's waiting list for Medicaid-funded home- and community-based services. During the campaign, the state funded 513 new waiver places, its largest allocation in more than a decade.

== Influence and reception ==
L'Arche has been discussed in religious writing, disability scholarship, and popular representations of intellectual disability. Alongside the writings of Henri Nouwen, its communities became a recurring subject in Christian theological discussions of vulnerability, friendship, and personhood. L'Arche has also been examined in interdisciplinary scholarship addressing spirituality, psychology, anthropology, disability studies, medical ethics, and political theory.

The movement and its members have appeared in documentary films. Randall Wright's feature documentary Summer in the Forest (2017), filmed principally in the original Trosly-Breuil community and in a L'Arche community near Bethlehem, received theatrical releases in the United Kingdom and North America. Reviews in The New York Times, Variety, The Guardian and other publications discussed the film's portrayal of intellectual disability, community, and human relationships.

L’Arche’s prominence in Christian discussions of disability has also generated criticism. Disability-studies scholars have questioned aspects of its religious language and its emphasis on vulnerability, brokenness and spiritual transformation, while other research has examined the agency and political belonging that can emerge within L’Arche alongside inequalities in caregiving relationships.
