= Marthe Robin =

20th-century French Roman Catholic mystic

Venerable Marthe Robin TOSF
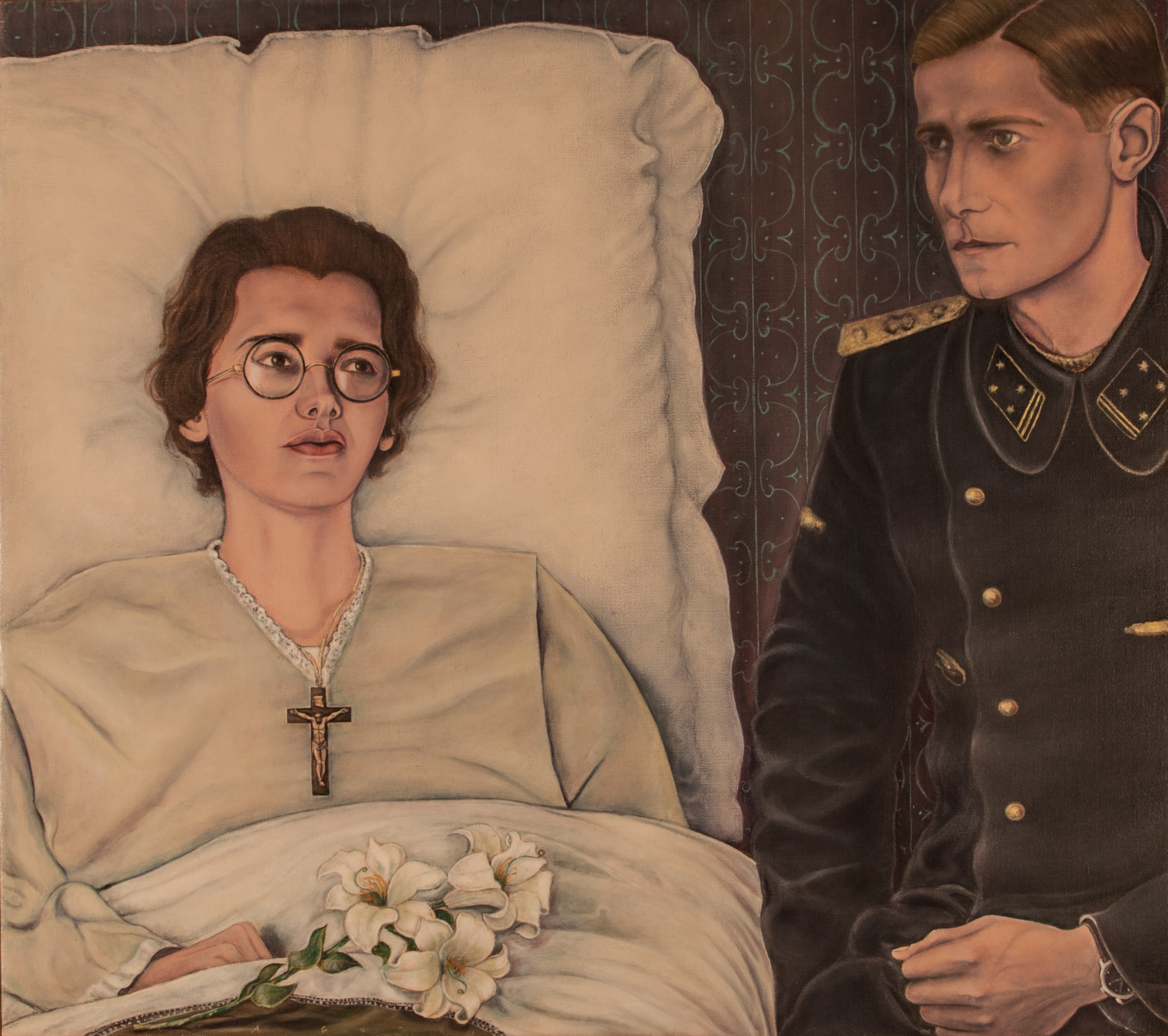
- Painting of Robin
- Born: 13 March 1902; Châteauneuf-de-Galaure, Auvergne-Rhône-Alpes, France
- Died: 6 February 1981 (aged 78); Châteauneuf-de-Galaure, Auvergne-Rhône-Alpes, France

Marthe Robin (13 March 1902 in Châteauneuf-de-Galaure, Drôme, France – 6 February 1981 in Châteauneuf-de-Galaure) was a French Roman Catholic mystic and stigmatist and foundress of the Foyers de charité ("Charity homes") association. She became bedridden when she was 21 and remained so until her death. According to witnesses she ate nothing for many years apart from receiving Holy Eucharist.

A file of documents supporting Robin's beatification was submitted to the diocesan authorities in 1987, and transmitted to the Vatican in 1996. On 6 May 2010 a "Positio" was signed in Rome by the Congregation for the Causes of Saints. This file was made up of all the documents that support Robin's reputation for holiness. It culminated in the recognition of her heroic virtue on 7 November 2014.

== Early life and education ==
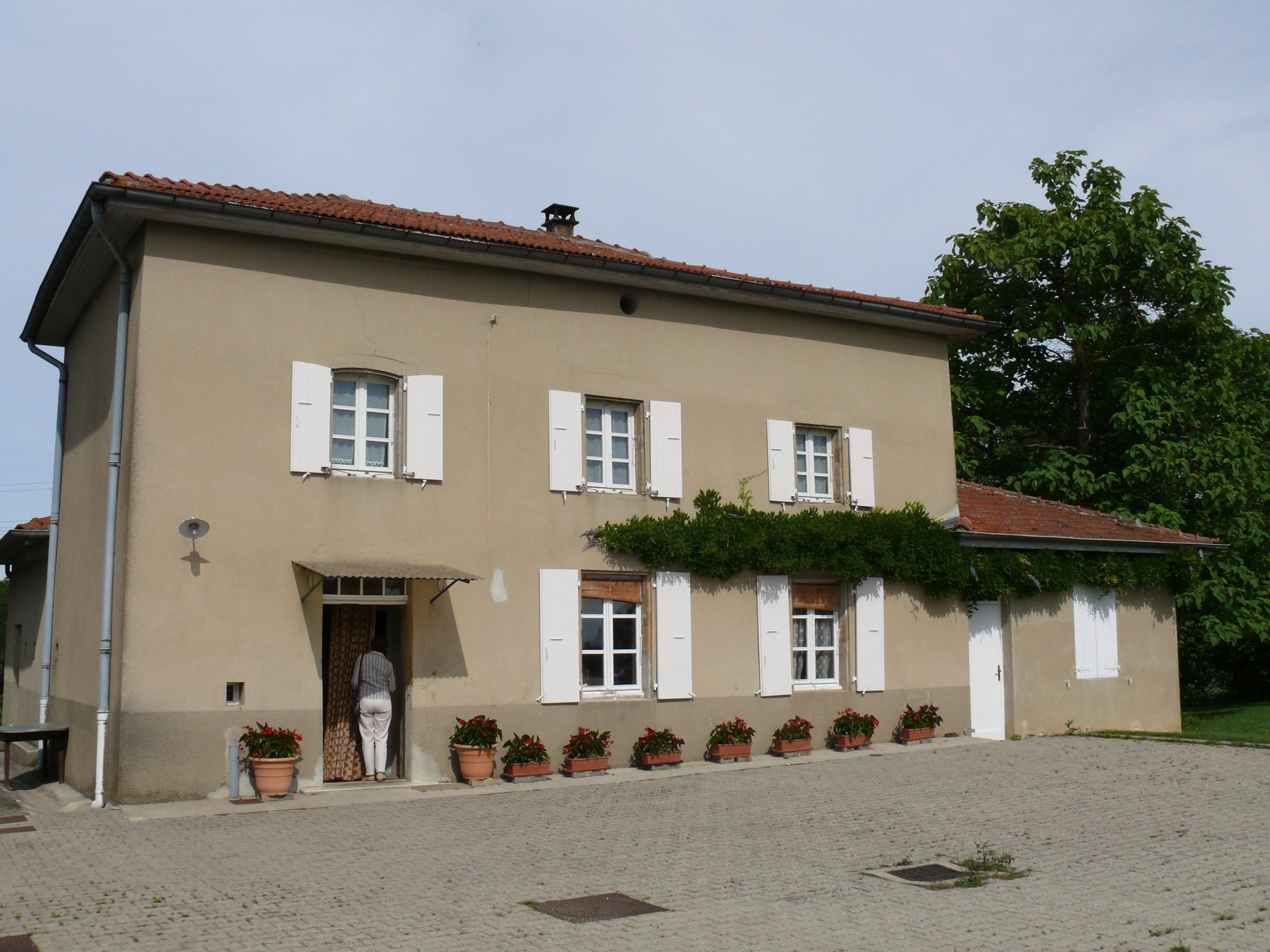
The Robin family's farm

Marthe Robin was born into a peasant farming family on 13 March 1902 in Châteauneuf-de-Galaure (Drôme, France), in a hamlet called Les Moillés, which was locally known as "La Plaine". She was the sixth and last child of Joseph-Michel Robin and Amélie-Célestine Robin (née Chosson). She attended the Châteauneuf-de-Galaure primary school, and stayed there until she was thirteen. She never took her end of primary school exams. She helped out on the family farm and participated in village life. Her personality is described by some witness as being "a happy young girl, open to the future, helpful, and sometimes mischievous...". In spite of the fact that her parents were non-practicing Catholics, Marthe was drawn to prayer at an early age. She said: "J'ai toujours énormément aimé le Bon Dieu comme petite fille… J'ai toujours énormément prié dans ma vie" ("I always really loved God when I was a little girl. I have always prayed throughout my life").

== Sickness ==
In 1903, Robin and her older sister, Clémence, both caught typhoid fever, of which Clémence died. Though close to death for a time, Marthe Robin recovered. Nevertheless, she had fragile health throughout the rest of her childhood.

Robin fell sick again on 1 December 1918. The doctors who examined her thought she had a brain tumor. She fell into a coma which lasted four days. When she came out of the coma, she seemed better for several weeks. Then the sickness got worse, until she was partially paralyzed. She also had eyesight problems, and lost her sight altogether for several months. In April–May 1921, she went into remission, but this was followed by several crises, which culminated in the definitive paralysis of her lower body from May 1928 onwards.

Robin continued to live on the farm, and her family and friends became her carers. Like many sick people, she suffered from the incomprehension of those around her, including members of her family. Her mobility problems, combined with hypersensitivity to light obliged her to become a recluse in a dark bedroom.

An interpretation of Robin's sickness has been given, on the basis of medical records gathered by the diocesan inquiry, and also a medical examination performed in 1942 by two doctors (Jean Dechaume, professor at Lyon Faculty of Medicine and a surgeon, André Ricard). She may have been suffering from lethargic encephalitis, also called von Economo disease, an inflammatory infection of the nervous system.

Robin's sickness strengthened her faith. In 1925, she wrote an Act of abandon and love to the will of God. She desired to consecrate herself to Christ and from then onwards loved the Eucharist more and more.

== Mystical phenomena ==
Robin's spiritual life was also marked by mystical phenomena. The testimonies of friends and family, priests, bishops and lay people who met her are recorded in the diocesan enquiry (1986–1996), and on the basis of this Bernard Peyrou, Postulator of the Cause for Beatification has written a biography of Robin. The authenticity of these testimonies in the eyes of the Catholic Church is currently being examined as part of the cause of beatification.

On 25 March 1922, according to the testimony of her sister Alice, Robin had a personal vision of the Virgin Mary. Following the testimonies gathered by the 1986 diocesan enquiry, this vision was followed by others. She reported that Christ appeared to her on the night of 4 December 1928. She confided about this vision to Père Faure, her parish priest, then took the decision to give her life entirely to God and to unite herself with his sufferings through prayer and love. From then on, her spiritual life was more and more centered on the Passion of Christ and the Eucharist. She received regular visits from several local priests.

From 1930 onwards, Robin supposedly ate no food other than the Eucharist, which she received once a week. This (unsought) fast lasted until her death fifty-one years later. Her stigmata first appeared in early October 1930. In October–November 1931 she started to relive the Passion of Christ every Friday, and this too lasted until her death in 1981. Many friends, family members and numerous priests witnessed this.

Robin herself appealed for discretion concerning these phenomena and encouraged Christians not to focus on them. Five successive bishops of the diocese of Valence to which Marthe Robin belonged, as well as being prudent, all said they knew Robin and that she had never come across as somebody to be mistrusted.

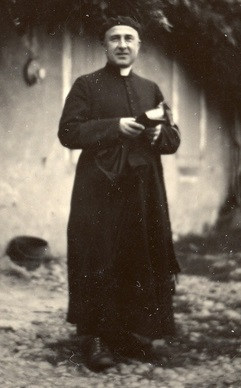
Georges Finet, spiritual director of Marthe Robin from 1936

=== Spiritual direction ===
On 3 December 1928, during a parish mission organized at Châteauneuf-de-Galaure, two Franciscan priests, Père Jean and Père Marie-Bernard, visited Robin. Père Marie-Bernard reassured her and talked to her about spiritual vocation. In 1928, she entered the Franciscan Third order.

In the same year, Père Faure, Robin's parish priest, became her spiritual director, a role that he did not relish because he could not personally relate to mystical experience. In 1936, Marthe Robin met Georges Finet, a priest from Lyon who took over Père Faure's role. Marthe's relationship with Georges Finet was close and continued for the rest of her life.

== Last days, death and funeral ==
In early February 1981, Robin had a coughing attack that became more and more acute. On Thursday 5 February, she had a high fever. That evening, like every Thursday, she prayed to be united to Christ in his Passion. Members of the Foyer de Charité said the Rosary around her bed, then left her alone. The following day, at about 5 a.m., when Père Finet went into her room, he found Robin unconscious on the floor, near her bed. She had died, probably of exhaustion, in the early hours of Friday 6 February. Père Colon, a medical doctor, and Dr Andolfatto, the doctor of Châteauneuf, confirmed her death. No autopsy was carried out. Her funeral took place on 12 February, in the sanctuary at Châteauneuf-de-Galaure, in the presence of four bishops and over 200 priests. Her tomb is in the cemetery of St Bonnet.

== Influence and posterity ==
=== Ministry to others ===
Although she was bedridden, Robin met countless people. She participated in the life of her diocese and her village as well as she was able. In October 1934, at her initiative, a girls' school was founded at Châteauneuf-de-Galaure. It developed rapidly. With the help of Georges Finet, she also founded the first Foyer de Charité. The foyer organized five-day retreats, and 2,000 retreatants participated annually. Most of them, at the end of the retreat, went to visit Marthe. It is estimated that, in fifty years, she individually met more than 100,000 people, including hundreds of priests and many bishops. Some visitors went to her seeking advice about their lives. In general, she did not give specific, categorical advice. Rather, she asked questions, made suggestions, prevented visitors from going off the subject, and let them reach their own conclusions. She was also a prolific letter writer, which she managed by dictating to a secretary.

Robin received visits from people such as Jean Guitton, Garrigou-Lagrange, Marcel Clément, Estelle Satabin, Father Thomas Philippe, Sister Magdeleine (1898–1989), founder of the Petites Sœurs de Jésus, Father Perrin, founder of the secular institute Caritas Christi, Father Henri Caffarel, founder of the Equipes Notre-Dame, sister Marie Dupont-Caillard, founder of the Sœurs et Frères de Bethléem. She also followed and supported, to differing degrees, the setting up of various of the new Catholic communities and associations that were founded in France during the 20th century, for example the Communauté Saint Jean, the Communauté de l'Emmanuel, the Communauté des Béatitudes, the Frères Missionnaires des Campagnes, founded by Father Epagneul, a Dominican, and the Association Claire Amitié, founded by Thérèse Cornille. She also met Father Eberhard, the founder of Notre-Dame de la Sagesse, Sister Norbert-Marie, who inspired the foundation of the Petites Sœurs de Nazareth, and Mère Myriam, who founded the communauté des Petites Sœurs de la Compassion, d'Israël et de Saint-Jean in 1982.

The number of visitors going to pray at the farmhouse on La Plaine, where Robin lived, doubled between 2001 and 2011, reaching 40,000 a year.

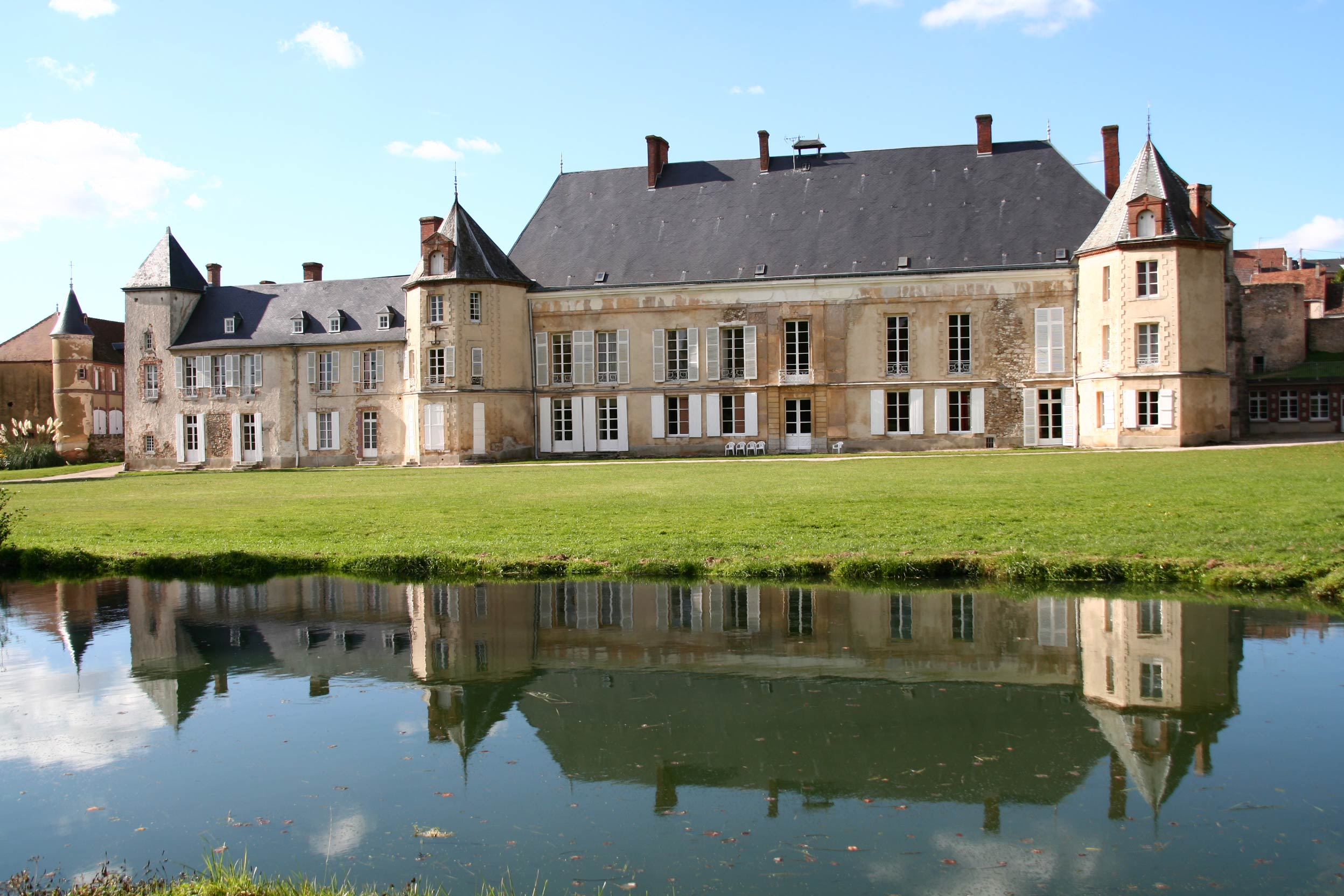
Foyer de Charite in Baye, Marne, France

=== Foyers de Charité ===
In 1936, Robin founded the Foyers de Charité at Châteauneuf-de-Galaure. Lay people participated in the life of this foyer, under the supervision of a priest. This involvement of lay people was unusual in pre-Vatican II Catholicism. Since then, a total of 75 these communities have been founded in 44 countries, either directly by Marthe herself or inspired by her example. In 1984, the Foyers de Charity were officially recognized by the Catholic Church as an Association of lay faithful of pontifical right, under the supervision of the Pontifical Council for the Laity.

The Foyers de Charité have in turn influenced the founders of various communities within the charismatic renewal, including the Community of St. John, the Emmanuel Community, and the Community of the Beatitudes.

=== Beatification process ===
In 1986, a diocesan inquiry was opened to investigate the possibility of Robin's beatification. Two religious experts, a theologian and a historian, were entrusted with the case in 1988. The Vatican granted a Nihil obstat in 1991. Between 1988 and 1996, more than 120 witnesses and experts were consulted. From 1993 to 1995, a critical biography was written for the Congregation for the Causes of Saints. A file of 17,000 pages was submitted to the Vatican in 1996.

A decree of the Congregation for the Causes of Saints dated 24 April 1998 agreed that the diocesan inquiry was valid. The Positio, a summary of 2000 pages of the beatification file which lays out the results of the diocesan inquiry was sent on 6 May 2010 for study to a commission of theologians, a meeting of whom was held on 11 December 2012. The heroic virtue of Marthe Robin was recognized on 7 November 2014 by Pope Francis (Press release of the French Bishops). She is therefore declared venerable.

== Medical and sceptical opinions ==
The philosopher Jean Guitton claimed that Robin was offered the possibility of medical analysis at a clinic for several months in order to prove to sceptics that her apparent inability to eat was not some elaborate hoax, but she declined, saying "Do you really think that will convince people? Those who don't believe it will not believe it any the more because of that." Consequently, there is no clinical proof of Robin's fifty-year fasting. Guitton deplored that "in this present era, prudence requires us to suppose that such phenomena can only be explained by autosuggestion, hysteria, or mental illness rather than by a noble and transcendent cause." The possibility of a hoax remains unexamined.

In 2020, a book by the Carmelite priest Conrad De Meester, published posthumously under the title "La fraude mystique de Marthe Robin" ("The Mystical Fraud of Marthe Robin"), argued that Robin had engaged in fraud in relation to her reported mystical experiences. The book generated controversy in France, particularly over its challenge to Robin's reputation and claims of mystical phenomena.

Specialist opinions on Robin are conflicting. Some scientific sceptics consider that her mystical manifestations, particularly her long fast, were simply an elaborate hoax, but numerous doctors at the time ruled out this possibility and others have diagnosed it as hysteria. For example:

- Jean Vuilleumier wrote: "Specialists have ruled out any possibility of hoax or simulation (…) they did not observe any signs of psychic perturbations (…), no sign of mental debility, no delirious manifestations."
- Though for Gonzague Mottet, l'avalanche de troubles qui n'ont en commun que leur appartenance à la classique sémiologie des manifestations hystériques est assez caricaturale pour nous permettre de porter le diagnostic de conversion hystérique. ("the avalanche of disorders that has nothing in common other than their listing under the classical semiology of hysterical manifestations is caricatural enough to allow for a diagnosis of hysterical conversion."),
- The Jesuit priest Herbert Thurston declared that he had encore jamais vu de cas de stigmatisation chez un sujet dépourvu de symptômes névrotiques. ("still never seen a case of stigmatization in a patient without any neurotic symptoms").
- According to an inquiry by the philosophy professor François de Muizon, both worn shoes and a basin containing melæna were found in Robin's room, which would seem to indicate that she could move more than was usually reported. He considered it most unfortunate that no autopsy was ever done.

== See also ==
- Alexandrina of Balazar
- Anne Catherine Emmerich
- Faustina Kowalska
- Floripes Dornellas de Jesus
- Francis of Assisi
- Lydwine of Schiedam
- Maria Domenica Lazzeri
- Maria Valtorta
- Marie Rose Ferron
- Padre Pio of Pietrelcina
- Thérèse of Lisieux

== Bibliography ==
- Marcel Clément, Pour entrer chez Marthe, Fayard, 1993.
- Jean Guitton, Portrait de Marthe Robin, Grasset, 1985; réédition Le Livre de Poche, 1999
- Henri-Marie Manteau-Bonamy, Marthe Robin sous la conduite de Marie, 1925–1932, éd. Saint-Paul, 1995, 191 pages.
- Jacques Ravanel, Le secret de Marthe Robin, Presses de la Renaissance, 2008
- Raymond Peyret, Marthe Robin: The Cross and the Joy Alba House, 1983 ISBN 0-8189-0464-X
