= Faith and Light =

Founded by Jean Vanier and Marie-Hélène Mathieu in 1971, Faith and Light is a cross-denominational Christian charitable association. The purpose of the association is to assist those with intellectual disabilities, and their friends and family, by fostering friendship, prayer, celebration and sharing. There are approximately 1,612 communities organized into 50 provinces, in 81 countries.

The Faith and Light's international head office and secretariat are in France; there are three employees.
