= Jean Vanier =

Canadian theologian and philosopher (1928–2019)

Jean Vanier CC GOQ
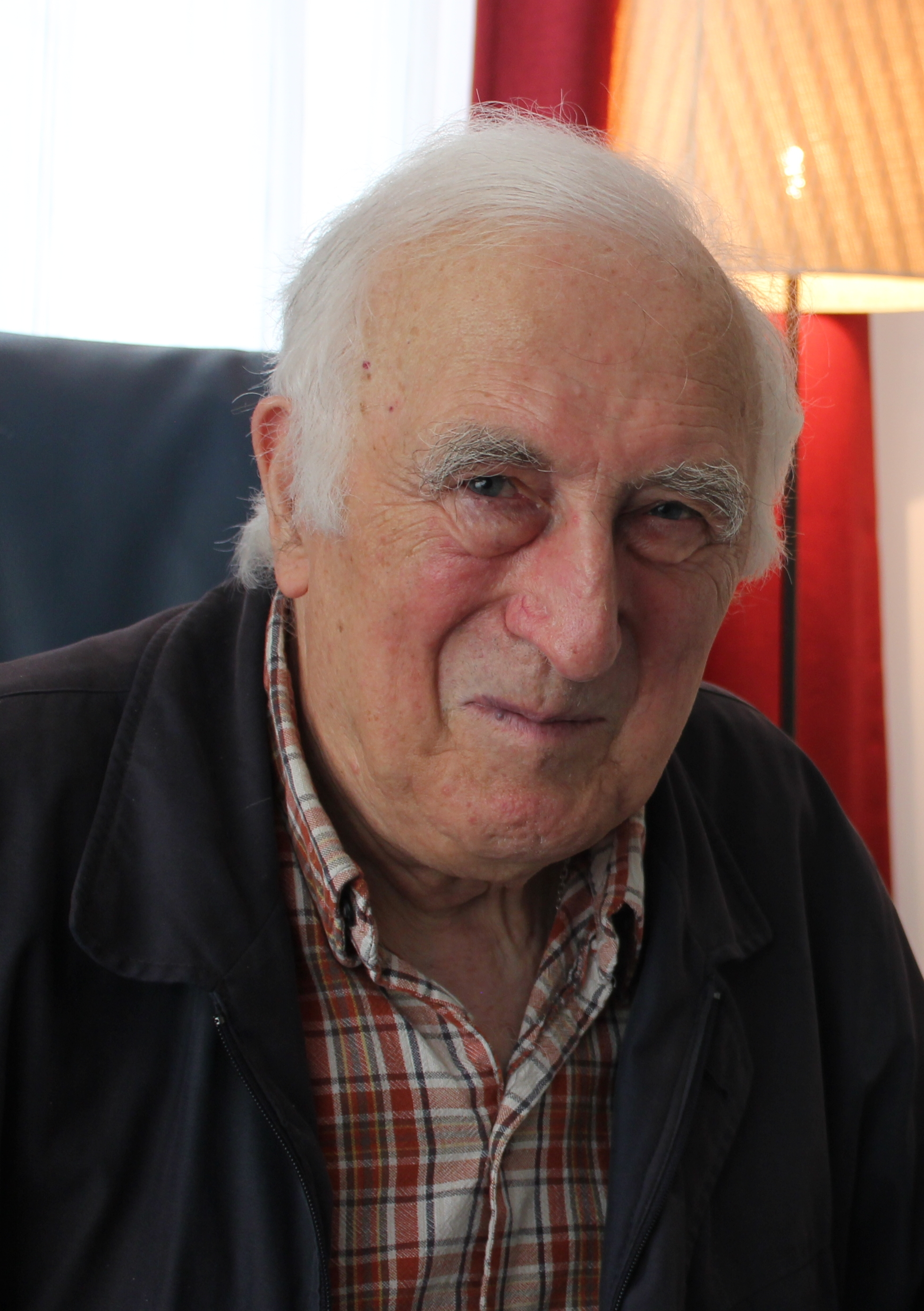
- Vanier in 2012
- Born: September 10, 1928; Geneva, Switzerland
- Died: May 7, 2019 (aged 90); Trosly-Breuil, France
- Known for: Founder of L'Arche
- Relatives: Georges Vanier, father Pauline Vanier, mother Thérèse Vanier, sister
- Awards: Order of Canada, 1972; National Order of Quebec, 1992; Legion of Honour, 2003; Humanitarian Award, 2001; Pacem in Terris Award, 2013; Templeton Prize, 2015
- Denomination: Catholic Church
- Military career
- Branch: Royal Canadian Navy
- Service years: 1941–1950
- Rank: Midshipman, naval officer
- Website: jean-vanier.org

Jean Vanier CC GOQ (French pronunciation: [ʒɑ̃ vanje], September 10, 1928 – May 7, 2019) was a Canadian Catholic philosopher and theologian. In 1964, he founded L'Arche, an international federation of communities spread over 37 countries for people with developmental disabilities and those who assist them. In 1971, he co-founded Faith and Light with Marie-Hélène Mathieu, which also works for people with developmental disabilities, their families, and friends in over 80 countries. He continued to live as a member of the original L'Arche community in Trosly-Breuil, France, until his death.

Over the years he wrote 30 books on religion, disability, normality, success, and tolerance. Among the honours he received were the Companion of the Order of Canada (1986), Grand Officer of the National Order of Quebec (1992), French Legion of Honour (2003), Community of Christ International Peace Award (2003, later revoked), the Pacem in Terris Peace and Freedom Award (2013), and the Templeton Prize (2015).

In February 2020, an internal report published by L'Arche concluded that Vanier sexually abused six women in Trosly-Breuil, France, between 1970 and 2005. The investigation was conducted by the UK-based GCPS Consulting Group.

== Early years and background ==
Vanier was the son of Canadian parents, Major-General Georges Vanier, who became the 19th Governor General of Canada (1959–1967), and his mother Pauline Vanier (née Archer). He was born in Geneva, and was the fourth of five siblings (including sister and brother Bernard Vanier), in his youth Vanier received a broad education in English and French, first in Canada and then in France and England. During World War II, Vanier and his family fled Paris just before the Nazi occupation. He spent much of the war at an English naval academy. From age 13, he trained for a career as a naval officer at the Dartmouth Naval College (later renamed Britannia Royal Naval College).

In early 1945, Vanier was visiting Paris, where his father was Canadian ambassador; he and his mother went to assist survivors of Nazi concentration camps. Seeing the emaciated victims was a profoundly moving encounter for him, which he never forgot. He served in World War II with the Royal Navy and then with the Royal Canadian Navy. In 1947, as a midshipman, Vanier accompanied the Royal Family on their tour of South Africa aboard HMS Vanguard.

In 1949, he joined the Royal Canadian Navy, at the carrier HMCS Magnificent. In 1950, he resigned his naval commission. Vanier travelled to Paris to study as an undergraduate. He eventually went on to complete a PhD in philosophy from the Institut Catholique de Paris, with a doctoral thesis on Aristotle which was published in 1966 as Happiness as Principle and End of Aristotelian Ethics; this was his first published work. He went on to write over 30 books during his career and taught philosophy at the University of St. Michael's College, University of Toronto. He left academia in 1964, seeking a more spiritual ministry. His research lives on at the Jean Vanier Research Centre located at King's University College in London, Ontario, Canada.

== Foundation of L'Arche ==
In 1964, through Vanier's friendship with a priest named Thomas Philippe, he became aware of the plight of thousands of people institutionalized with developmental disabilities. Vanier invited two men, Raphael Simi and Philippe Seux, to leave the institutions where they resided and live with him in Trosly-Breuil, France. Their time together led to the establishment of L'Arche at Trosly-Breuil, a community where people with disabilities live with those who care for them. Since that time a network of 150 L'Arche communities have been established in 38 countries. A governing philosophy of the communities is Vanier's belief that people with disabilities are teachers, rather than burdens bestowed upon families.

Until the late 1990s, Vanier carried the responsibility for L'Arche in Trosly-Breuil in France, and for the International Federation of L'Arche. He then stepped down to spend more time counselling, encouraging, and accompanying the people who come to live in L'Arche as assistants to those with disabilities. Vanier established 147 L'Arche communities in 37 countries around the world which have become places of pilgrimage for those involved.

== Later life ==
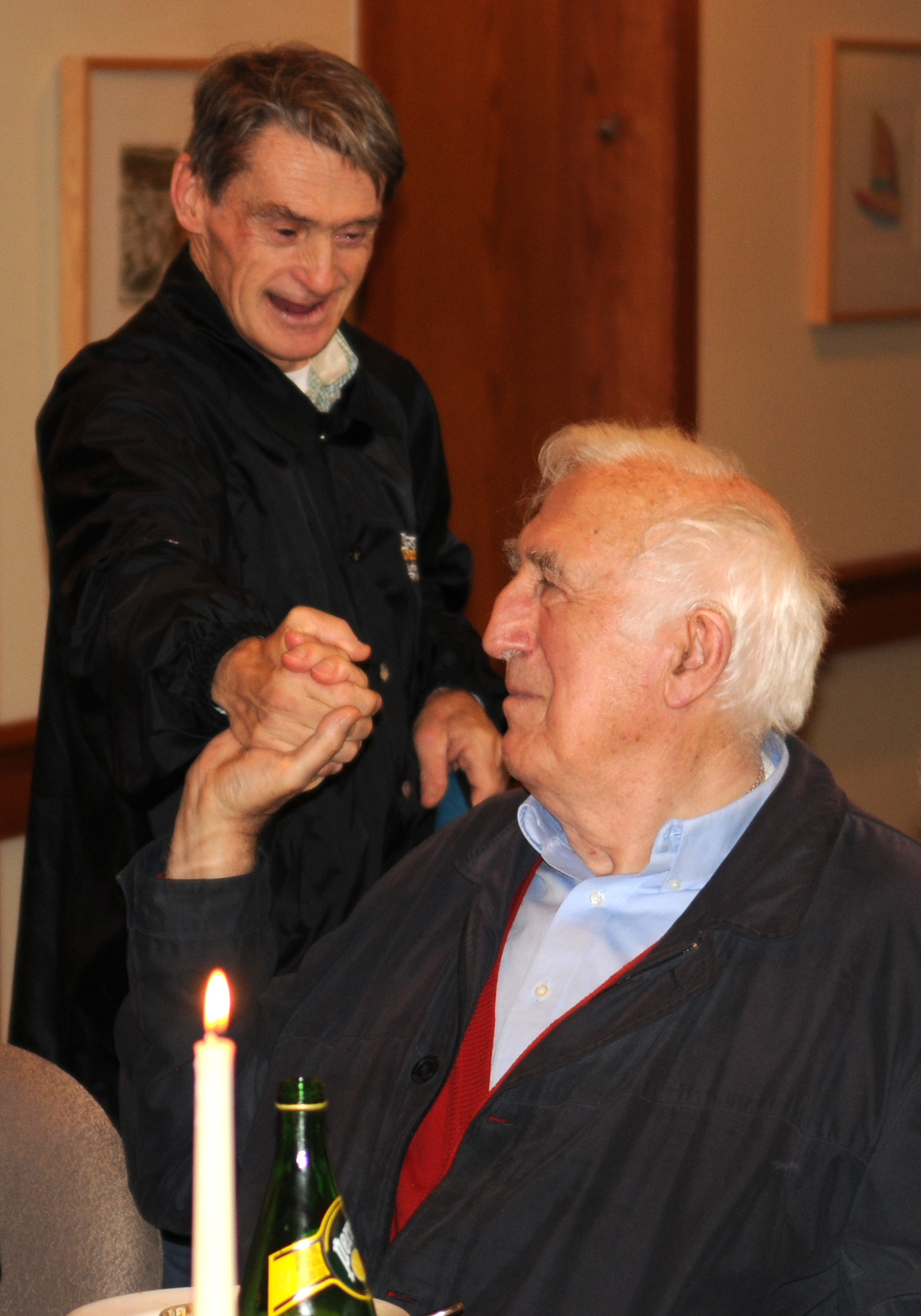
Vanier with John Smeltzer, a member of L'Arche Daybreak, 2009

In 1968, Vanier gave a Faith and Sharing retreat in Mary Lake, Ontario, the first in his movement of retreats where people from many walks of life are welcome. The retreats continue today as part of the Faith and Sharing Federation.

As of 2013, there were 13 communities in North America that organize annual retreats and days of prayer. Faith and Sharing member Bill Clark, SJ, explains: "There is then a two-fold movement in Faith and Sharing: an inward movement towards God hidden in the depths of our own vulnerability, and an outward movement towards our brothers and sisters, especially those who are more poor and in need."

In 1971, Vanier co-founded Faith and Light with Marie-Hélène Mathieu. This is an international movement of forums for people with developmental disabilities, their family and friends. Today there are over 1,500 Faith and Light communities in 81 countries around the world.

Vanier continued to live in the original L'Arche community of Trosly-Breuil, France, until his death in 2019. He continued to travel widely, visiting other L'Arche communities, encouraging projects for new communities and giving lectures and retreats. He was the 1998 Massey lecturer, focusing on the theme of "Becoming Human". During one of his lectures, he touched on his distaste for barriers around people with intellectual disabilities, a motivating philosophy behind L'Arche: "We must do what we can to diminish walls, to meet each other. Why do we put people with disabilities behind walls?"

In 2017, Vanier narrated and appeared in the documentary Summer In The Forest, filmed in the L'Arche communities in Trosly-Breuil and Bethlehem and featuring many of the residents of both communities with whom he worked. Writing in the New York Times, critic Ken Jaworowski observed that "just watching the residents leads you to confront and change many of your own preconceptions."

Vanier died on May 7, 2019. A week before his death, Pope Francis called Vanier to thank him for his years of ministry and service. Following his death, Pope Francis, who was flying back to Rome from North Macedonia, told a group of journalists, "I want to express my gratitude for his testimony" and said Vanier could read and interpret not only the Christian gaze on "the mystery of death, of the cross, of suffering", but also "the mystery of those who are discarded by the world".

Among those he influenced were the Dutch Catholic priest, professor, writer and theologian Henri Nouwen who came to join the L'Arche Daybreak community in Richmond Hill, Ontario.

== Sexual abuse ==
In February 2020, an internal report by L'Arche concluded that Vanier sexually abused six women in Trosly-Breuil, France, between 1970 and 2005.

According to a joint statement by leaders of L'Arche International, Vanier had engaged in "manipulative and emotionally abusive" sexual relationships with six women without disabilities in France, between 1970 and 2005. Sexual relations were instigated by Vanier, usually in the context of giving spiritual guidance. The statement read, "These women reported similar facts associated with highly unusual spiritual or mystical explanations used to justify these behaviours... The relationships ... had a significant negative impact on their personal lives and subsequent relationships. These actions are indicative of a deep psychological and spiritual hold Jean Vanier had on these women." It also said that Vanier asked the women to keep the incidents secret. The women included assistants and nuns. Vanier was also a member of a small clandestine group which subscribed to and participated in some of the sexual practices of disgraced priest Thomas Philippe, the L'Arche statement said.

A fuller report by an independent group commissioned by L'Arche, published in January 2023, learned of 25 different women who had experienced a sexual act or intimate gesture (such as kissing on the mouth or caresses to the body, most commonly the breasts) with Jean Vanier. These relationships in total span from 1952 to 2019. Vanier would typically initiate contact through meetings nominally about spiritual accompaniment; after some time, body contact and nudity would gradually be introduced into the spiritual accompaniment sessions. The most common pattern described is one where Vanier would kneel down in front of the woman with his head against her chest and then make contact with her breasts, and, if permitted, would caress the breasts with his mouth. Some of the women only came to regard these moments of contact as abusive many years later. Vanier would often quote from the Song of Songs. The practices were founded on so-called "mystical" or "spiritual" beliefs that had been condemned by the Catholic Church, it added. Vanier described Philippe, who died in 1993, as his "spiritual father", but at first publicly denied knowledge of the practices. The investigation was carried out by independent UK consultancy GCPS.

Vanier wrote in May 2015 that he now accepted that Philippe "hurt mature and intelligent people who appear to have placed all their trust in him" and that "I am unable to peacefully reconcile these two realities."

=== Reactions ===
Cardinal Thomas Collins of the Archdiocese of Toronto described the events "tragic and heart wrenching". The Canadian and American branches of L'Arche have voiced their concern in various statements.

In Canada, where there were many schools named after Vanier, some school boards have renamed schools named for him.

In February 2020, the University of Notre Dame in South Bend, Indiana, posthumously stripped Vanier of two awards which the university had awarded him, including the 1994 Notre Dame Award for humanitarian service.

== Awards and honours ==
Vanier received numerous awards for his work, including the Companion of the Order of Canada, Officer of the Order of the Legion of Honour (France, 2003) and many awards from faith groups, among them the Paul VI International Prize, the Community of Christ International Peace Award (later revoked), the Rabbi Gunther Plaut Humanitarian Award, and the Gaudium et Spes Award, named after the Second Vatican Council's Gaudium et spes document.

In 1993, he received the Loyola Medal from Concordia University. In 1999, he won the Writers' Trust of Canada's Gordon Montador Award for Becoming Human.

In November 2004, a Canadian Broadcasting Corporation poll ranked him as number 12 in a list of greatest Canadians.

In 2010, the asteroid 8604 was officially named Vanier in his honour.

In 2013, he received the United States–based Pacem in Terris Peace and Freedom Award, established by the Diocese of Davenport, Iowa.

In March 2015, Vanier was awarded the $1.7 million Templeton Prize in recognition of his advocacy for people with disabilities and his contributions to a broader exploration of helping the weak and vulnerable.

On September 27, 2016, Vanier received the Peace Abbey Foundation (USA) International Courage of Conscience Award in Trosly-Breuil, France, for his lifelong commitment to building a world of inclusion for individuals with disabilities.

=== Schools formerly named after Vanier ===
Many schools were previously named after Vanier, however, as of 2022, all of them have been renamed in light of the posthumous report of his involvement in abusive sexual relationships:

- École secondaire catholique l'Envolée du Nord in Kirkland Lake, Ontario was renamed from École catholique Jean-Vanier by the Conseil scolaire catholique de district des Grandes-Rivières in April 2020.
- Our Lady Queen of the World Catholic Academy in Richmond Hill, Ontario, was renamed from Jean Vanier Catholic High School by the York Catholic District School Board in May 2020.
- St. Francis Xavier Catholic Secondary School in Milton, Ontario, was renamed from Jean Vanier Catholic Secondary School by the Halton Catholic District School Board in June 2020.
- St. Joan of Arc Catholic Academy in Scarborough, Ontario, was renamed from Jean Vanier Catholic Secondary School by the Toronto Catholic District School Board in July 2020.
- Our Lady of the Bay Catholic High School in Collingwood, Ontario, was renamed from Jean Vanier Catholic High School in June 2020.
- St. Nicholas Catholic School in Sherwood Park, Alberta was renamed from Jean Vanier Catholic School by Elk Island Catholic Schools in April 2020.
- St. Maria Faustina School in Regina, Saskatchewan, was renamed from Jean Vanier School by the Regina Catholic School Division in June 2020.
- Madonna Della Libera Catholic Elementary School in Brantford, Ontario, was renamed from Jean Vanier Catholic Elementary School by the Brant Haldimand Norfolk Catholic District School Board in June 2020.
- École secondaire catholique Saint-Jean-de-Brébeuf in Welland, Ontario, was renamed from École Secondaire Catholique Jean-Vanier by the Conseil scolaire catholique MonAvenir in July 2020.
- St. Rose of Lima Catholic Elementary School in London, Ontario, was renamed from Jean Vanier Catholic Elementary School by the London District Catholic School Board in September 2021.
- St. Francis of Assisi Catholic Secondary School in Whitehorse, Yukon was renamed from Vanier Catholic Secondary School by the secondary school council in June 2022.

== Books ==
- In weakness, strength: The spiritual sources of General the Rt. Hon. Georges P. Vanier, 19th Governor-General of Canada. Toronto: Griffin House. 1969. OCLC 77213.
- Tears of silence. Toronto: Griffin. 1970. OCLC 395235248.
- Eruption to hope. Toronto: Griffin House. 1971. OCLC 838694372.
- Followers of Jesus. Toronto: Griffin Press. 1973. OCLC 859939780.
- Be not afraid. Toronto: Griffin House. 1975. OCLC 494744391.
- Community and growth: Our pilgrimage together. Toronto: Griffin House. 1979. OCLC 6277986.
- The Challenge of L'Arche. Ottawa: Novalis. 1981. OCLC 8872141.
- I meet Jesus : he tells me 'I love you', story of the love of God through the Bible. Ramsay, N.J.: Paulist Press. 1981. OCLC 15975370.
- I walk with Jesus. Mahwah, N.J.: Paulist Press. 1985. OCLC 14227091.
- Man and woman He made them. Mahwah, N.J.: Paulist Press. 1985. OCLC 13025956.
- Jesus, the gift of love. London: Hodder & Stoughton. 1988. OCLC 895940048.
- The broken body. Mahwah, N.J.: Paulist Press. 1988. OCLC 17694012.
- Images of love, words of hope. Hantsport, N.S.: Lancelot Press. 1991. OCLC 25369178.
- A network of friends, volume one : 1964–1973 : the letters of Jean Vanier to the friends and communities of L'Arche. Hantsport, N.S.: Lancelot Press. 1992. OCLC 317449807.
- From brokenness to community. New York: Paulist Press. 1992. OCLC 25409710.
- An ark for the poor: the story of L'Arche. Ottawa: Novalis. 1995. OCLC 32546881.
- The heart of L'Arche: A spirituality for every day. Toronto: Novalis. 1995. OCLC 33333740.
- The scandal of service: Jesus washes our feet. Ottawa: Novalis. 1996. OCLC 36698314.
- Our journey home: Rediscovering a common humanity beyond our differences. Ottawa: Novalis. 1997. OCLC 35919344.
- Vanier, Jean; Andreu, Anne-Sophie; Quoist, Michel (1996). A door of hope. London: Hodder & Stoughton. OCLC 60292140.
- Becoming Human. Toronto: Anansi. 2001. OCLC 654379327.
- Made for happiness: Discovering the meaning of life with Aristotle. London: Darton, Longman & Todd. 2001. OCLC 47824661.
- Seeing beyond depression. London: SPCK. 2001. OCLC 46810914.
- Finding peace. Toronto: House of Anansi Press. 2003. OCLC 52644543.
- Drawn into the mystery of Jesus through the Gospel of John. New York: Paulist Press. 2004. OCLC 892517848.
- Befriending the stranger. Toronto: Novalis. 2005. OCLC 66031013.
- Our life together: A memoir in letters. London: Darton Longman Todd. 2008. OCLC 260043937.
- Vanier, Jean; Hauerwas, Stanley (2008). Living gently in a violent world: The prophetic witness of weakness. Downers Grove, Ill.: IVP Books. OCLC 837379461.
- From Brokenness to Wholeness. Singapore: MEDIO MEDIA. 2012. OCLC 858345447.
- The Gospel of John, the Gospel of Relationship. Cincinnati: Franciscan Media, 2015. ISBN 978-1-61636-890-6.
- Life's Great Questions. Cincinnati: Franciscan Media, 2015. ISBN 978-1-61636-941-5.
- Jean Vanier: Portrait of a Free Man. Walden, NY: Plough. 2019. OCLC 1089839058.
