= Trosly-Breuil =

- Commune
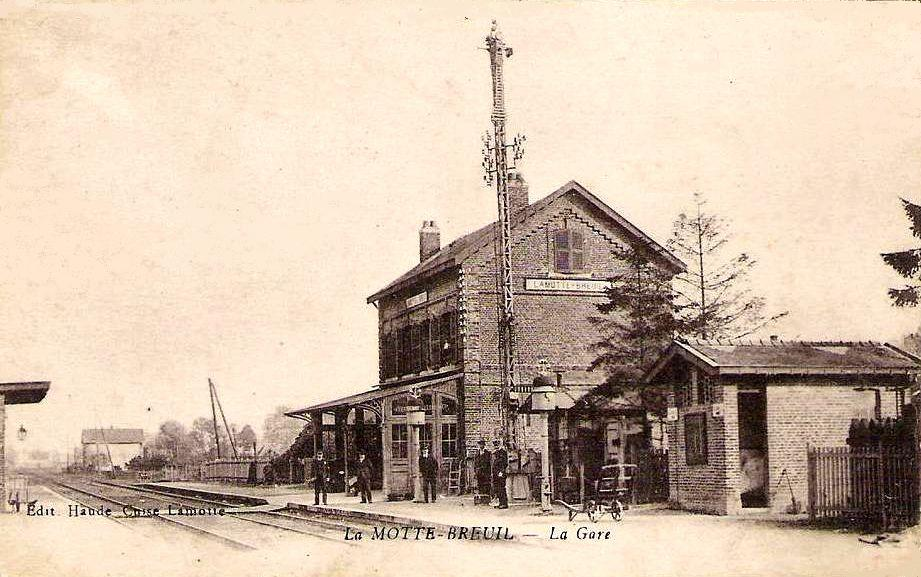
- The railway station of Lamotte-Breuil
- Location of Trosly-Breuil
- Location within France Location within Hauts-de-France
- Coordinates: 49°23′57″N 2°58′04″E
- Country: France
- Region: Hauts-de-France
- Department: Oise
- Arrondissement: Compiègne
- Canton: Compiègne-1
- Intercommunality: Lisières de l'Oise

Government
  - Mayor (2020–2026): Sylvain Goupil
- Area^{1}: 10.98 km^{2} (4.24 sq mi)
- Elevation: 39 m (128 ft)
- Highest elevation: 126 m (413 ft)
- Lowest elevation: 32 m (105 ft)
- Population (2023): 2,077
  - Density: 189.2/km^{2} (489.9/sq mi)
- Time zone: UTC+01:00 (CET)
  - Summer (DST): UTC+02:00 (CEST)
- INSEE/Postal code: 60647 /60350
- ^{1} French Land Register data, which excludes lakes, ponds, glaciers > 1 km^{2} (0.386 sq mi or 247 acres) and river estuaries.

Trosly-Breuil (French pronunciation: [tʁoli bʁœj]) is a commune in the Oise department in northern France.

In 1964, Canadian Jean Vanier invited two men, Raphael Simi and Philippe Seux, to leave the institutions where they lived and live with him in Trosly-Breuil. Their time together led to the establishment of L'Arche at Trosly-Breuil, a community for people with disabilities to live with those who cared for them. Since that time L'Arche communities have been established in fifty countries around the world.

== Population ==
Historical population
Year	Pop.	±% p.a.
1968	1,963	—
1975	2,098	+0.95%
1982	1,972	−0.88%
1990	2,034	+0.39%
1999	2,164	+0.69%
2007	2,042	−0.72%
2012	2,118	+0.73%
2017	2,081	−0.35%
2023	2,077	−0.03%
Source: INSEE

== See also ==
- Communes of the Oise department
