= Vanier =

Vanier may refer to:

== People ==
- Jean Vanier (1928–2019), Canadian founder of L'Arche
- Jeannine Vanier (born 1929), blind Canadian composer and organist
- Nicolas Vanier (born 1962), French documentary filmmaker
- Georges Vanier (1888–1967), former Governor General of Canada
- Pauline Vanier (1898–1991), Canadian humanitarian
- Zachary Vanier (born 2003), Canadian racing driver

== Places ==
- Vanier, Ontario, Canada
- Vanier, Quebec City, Canada
- Vanier Park, Vancouver, British Columbia, Canada

== Other ==
- Vanier Institute of the Family, Canada
- Vanier College in Saint-Laurent, Montreal, Quebec, Canada
- Vanier Cup, Canadian Interuniversity Sport Canadian football trophy
- Vanier (electoral district), a Quebec provincial electoral district, Canada
- Vanier Canada Graduate Scholarships
- 8604 Vanier, an asteroid named in honour of Jean Vanier
