= Thérèse Vanier =

British-Canadian physician and Captain (1923–2014)

Thérèse Vanier MRCP, FRCP
- Born: Thérèse Marie Chérisy Vanier; 27 February 1923; Camberley, Surrey, England
- Died: 16 June 2014 (aged 91); Lambeth, London, England
- Parents: Georges Vanier (father); Pauline Vanier (mother)
- Relatives: Jean Vanier (brother)
- Military career
- Rank: Captain
- Units: Mechanised Transport Corps; Canadian Women's Army Corps
- Conflict: Second World War; Battle of the Atlantic

Thérèse Marie Chérisy Vanier MRCP, FRCP (27 February 1923 – 16 June 2014) was a British-Canadian palliative care physician, haematologist and Captain. With her brother, Vanier co-founded L'Arche UK, a branch of the international organisation dedicated to the communal care of people with learning disabilities, establishing the first community in Barfrestone near Canterbury in 1974. During the Second World War, Vanier served in the Mechanised Transport Corps and the Canadian Women's Army Corps.

== Biography ==
Thérèse Vanier was born on 27 February 1923 in Camberley, Surrey to Pauline Vanier (née Archer), an appointed member of the Queen's Privy Council for Canada and Georges Vanier, a decorated soldier and former Governor General of Canada. Her third name, Chérisy, marks the location in France where her father lost a leg in the trenches during World War I. Vanier was the eldest of five children. Her brother Jean Vanier, a trained naval officer and Catholic philosopher founded the first L'Arche community in Trosly-Breuil, France in 1964.

As a young adult Vanier studied at Mayfield in East Sussex. At the age of 19, she signed up with the British Mechanised Transport Corps and sailed in a convey as part of the Battle of the Atlantic. Vanier went on to join the Canadian Women’s Army Corps, eventually rising to the rank of captain.

After World War II Vanier studied medicine at the Sorbonne and Cambridge University. Vanier completed her clinical studies at St Thomas’ Hospital in Central London where she became the first female consultant in haematology. It was during this time that she met lifelong friend Cicely Saunders, a pioneer in hospice care, and the founder of St Christopher's Hospice.

In 1972 Vanier resigned from her position at St Thomas' Hospital to join Saunders at St Christopher's where she taught and pursued clinical work in the burgeoning field of palliative care.

Vanier opened the first English L'Arche community in January 1974 in Barfrestone near Canterbury in Kent. She went on to personally oversee the opening of four other communities. Today there are ten communities in the UK, including one in Lambeth, south London, where Vanier lived, almost until her death in 2014. Vanier's Catholic Requiem mass took place at the Anglican Canterbury Cathedral on 10 July 2014. Her body was laid to rest at Barfrestone cemetery, around 100 metres from "Little Ewell", the first L'Arche Kent Community house she helped to establish in 1974.
