= Georges Vanier =

Governor General of Canada from 1959 to 1967

Major General The Right Honourable Georges Vanier PC DSO MC CD
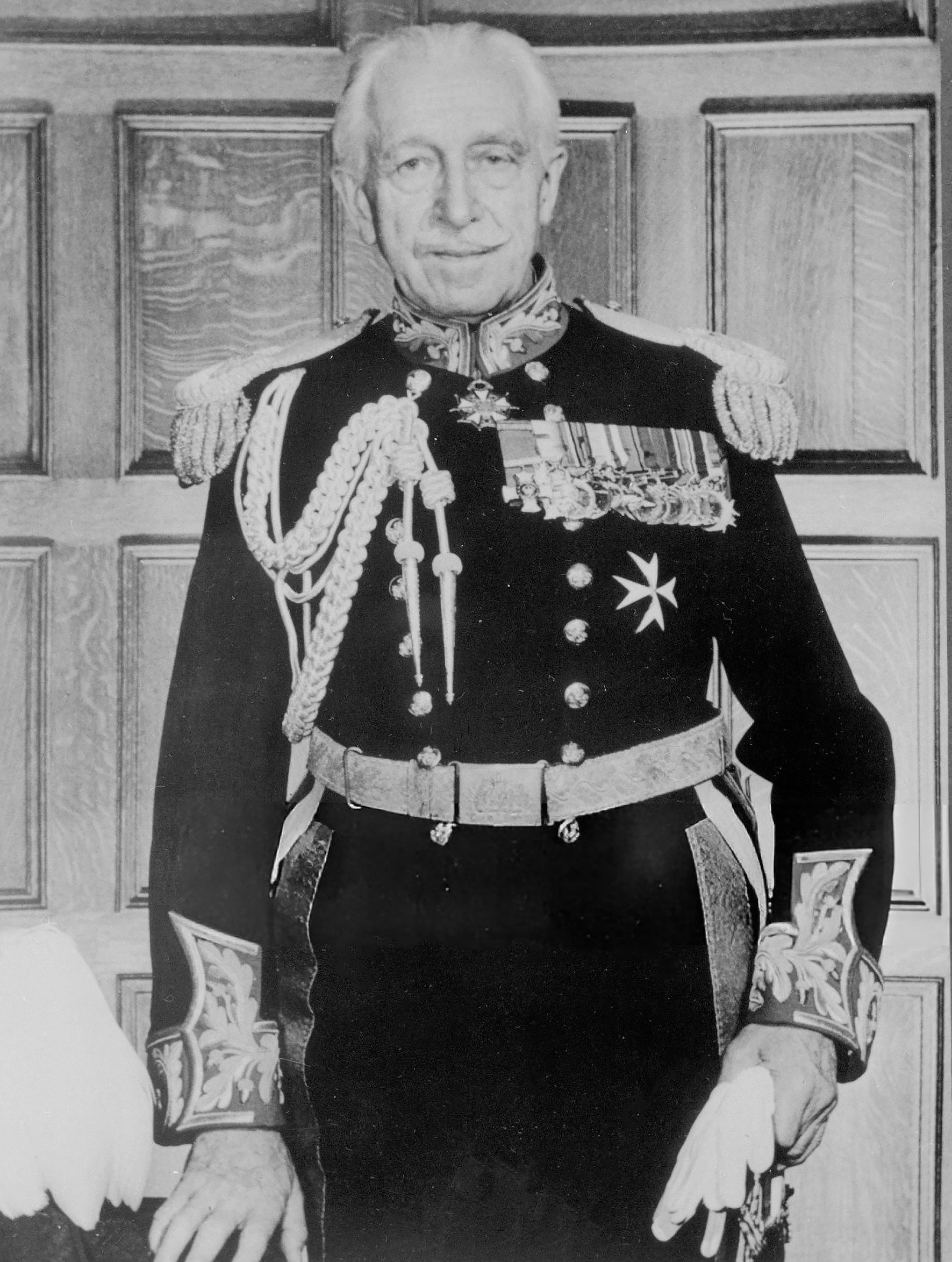
- Vanier in 1965

19th Governor General of Canada
- In office 15 September 1959 – 5 March 1967
- Monarch: Elizabeth II
- Prime Minister: John Diefenbaker; Lester B. Pearson
- Preceded by: Vincent Massey
- Succeeded by: Roland Michener

Personal details
- Born: Georges-Philias Vanier; 23 April 1888 Montreal, Quebec, Canada
- Died: 5 March 1967 (aged 78) Ottawa, Ontario, Canada
- Resting place: Memorial Chapel at Citadelle
- Party: Liberal
- Spouse: Pauline Archer (m. 1921)
- Children: 5, including Thérèse and Jean

Military service
- Allegiance: Canada
- Branch: Canadian Army
- Service years: 1914–1948, 1952–1964 (honorary)
- Rank: General
- Commands: Royal 22nd Regiment
- Wars: First World War; Second World War
- Awards: Distinguished Service Order; Military Cross & Bar; Mention in dispatches

Georges-Philias Vanier (French: [ʒɔʁʒ(ə) vanje]; 23 April 1888 – 5 March 1967) was a Canadian military officer, diplomat, and statesman who served as the 19th governor general of Canada from 1959 to 1967, the first Quebecker and second Canadian-born person to hold the position.

Vanier was born and educated in Quebec. In 1906, he was valedictorian when he graduated with a BA from Loyola College. After earning a university degree in law, he served in the Canadian army during the First World War; on the European battlefields, he lost a leg and was commended for his actions with a number of decorations from King George V.

Subsequently, Vanier returned to Canada and remained in the military until the early 1930s, when he was posted to diplomatic missions in Europe. With the outbreak of the Second World War, Vanier once again became active in the military, commanding troops on the home front until the cessation of hostilities in 1945, whereupon he returned to diplomatic circles.

Vanier was appointed to replace Vincent Massey as governor general in 1959 by Queen Elizabeth II, on the recommendation of Canadian Prime Minister John Diefenbaker, and he occupied the post until his death in 1967. Vanier proved to be a popular governor general, with his war record earning respect from the majority of Canadians; however, as a Quebecer, he was met with hostility by Quebec separatists.

== Early life ==
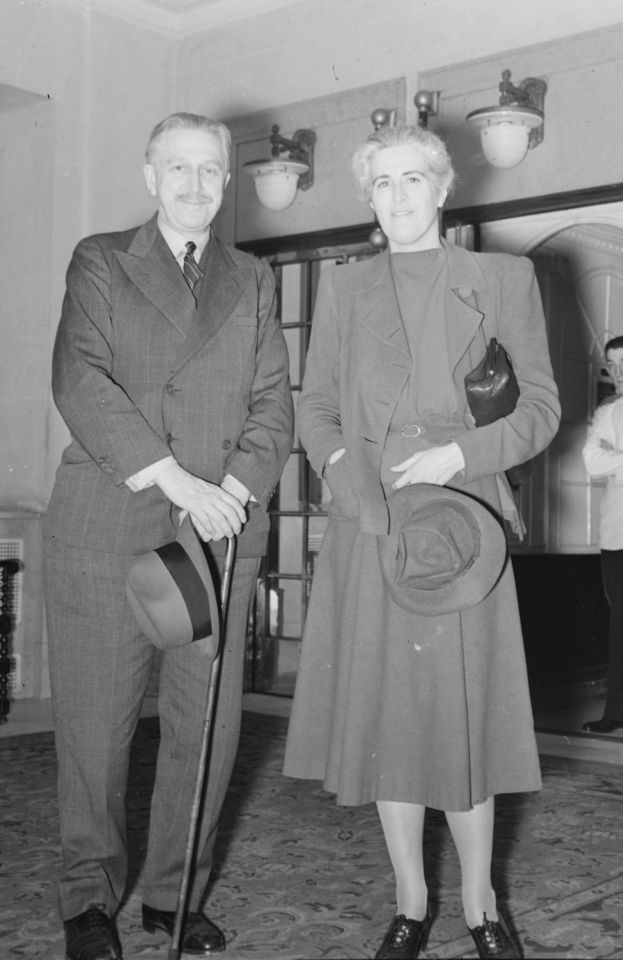
Georges and Pauline Vanier in 1940

Vanier was born in the Little Burgundy neighbourhood of Montreal to an Irish mother, Margaret (Maloney), and a French-Norman father, Philias Vanier, who raised Vanier to be bilingual. Vanier was descended from Guillaume Vanier of Honfleur who moved to Quebec City around 1670 and in 1672 married Magdeleine Bailly, a fille du roi from Paris. The Vanier family resided in Quebec City at first and in the 18th century moved up the St. Lawrence river to Montreal, the biggest and wealthiest city in New France. Vanier's maternal grandparents were John Maloney and his wife Elizabeth (née Fitzgibbons), Irish immigrants who arrived in Montreal in search of a better life. Vanier's father was a successful businessman and was one of the first people in Montreal to own an automobile, which he never learned how to drive, instead hiring a chauffeur. Vanier's father was wealthy enough to own two cottages, one on Lake Memphremagog and another on the St. Lawrence.

He attended the Jesuit-run Loyola College (a collège classique), receiving in 1906 a Bachelor of Arts degree in church devotional fellowship. At Loyola, Vanier received the typical collège classique education with a strong emphasis on Catholic theology, Latin, Greek, philosophy, the classics, literature and math with the only difference being that his education was in English instead of French, as was usually the case with the collège classiques. Vanier was considered to be a very good student who excelled both academically and at sports such as boxing and especially hockey.

At Loyola, inspired by his literacy heroes, John Keats and Percy Bysshe Shelley, he entertained the ambition of being a poet. Under the pseudonym Georges Raymound, Vanier had several of his flowery English language poems published in The Siemens Magazine of Toronto. Though Vanier later admitted that his efforts at poetry were somewhat embarrassing, his favorite English poets remained Keats and Shelly for the duration of his life. As a student, he was quiet and reserved with his passions reserved for hockey as he later recalled that his happiest moment at Loyola was scoring the winning goal for his school's hockey team with just a minute left in the game. The most important intellectual influence on Vanier at Loyola was a French Jesuit, Father Pierre Gaume, who taught French at the school. Inspired by Father Gaume, Vanier hired a tutor, a Frenchman living in Montreal, Camille Martin, who introduced him to French literature and culture in general. Martin was a mysterious character who had left France for unknown reasons and ran his tutoring services for the French-Canadian haut bourgeois out of his house on Mackay street, known locally as "The Hermitage". Martin was an inspiring teacher and his influence on the teenage Vanier was described as "enormous". In 1906, Vanier was the class valedictorian when he graduated from Loyola.

In 1908, Father Gaume, who continued to correspond with Vanier, criticized him for his reserve, leading Vanier to reply: "Intimate feelings of joy, sadness, desires, aren't something to write about. They can be spoken about, and in fact are more often understood, with gestures, looks and tones of voice". In another letter, Father Gaume criticized Vanier for his fondness for Molière, warning him that Molière had written "abominable things" about the Catholic Church, and should only be read in censored versions of his works. Though several of Vanier's Jesuit teachers had suggested that he pursue a career as a priest, the rigid worldview of his teachers such as Father Gaume who tried to steer him away from writers such as Molière seems to have persuaded him against a career as a priest. In May 1908, Vanier wrote to Father Gaume to say that after much thought, he had decided that he lacked the calling to be a priest.

Vanier then went on to earn his Bachelor of Laws degree in 1911 from the Montreal campus of the Université Laval. Vanier was called to the Quebec bar that year and, though he took up the practice of law, he considered entering the Catholic priesthood. Though educated in English at Loyola College, Vanier had an intense love of French literature and poetry that was to last for the rest of his life. Like many other middle-class French-Canadians of his generation, France was his ideal, and his favorite city was Paris. Vanier considered Montreal to be a somewhat provincial city that lacked the glamour of Paris, and as a young man, he was a member of a group of intellectuals called École littéraire de Montréal that were sought to bring French-Canadian literature up as they saw it the standards of French literature. In January 1912, Vanier first visited Paris, where he attended a number of literacy salons to hear the readings of the latest in French poetry.

== Soldier ==
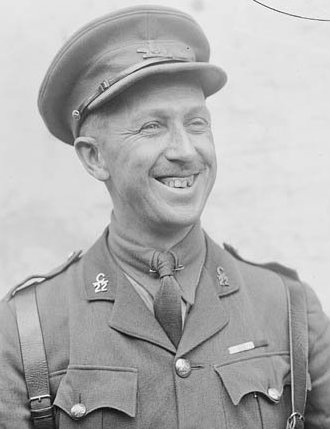
Vanier in 1918

With the outbreak of the First World War, he decided that offering his service to his country should take priority and thereafter enlisted in the Canadian Army. In response to the German invasion of Belgium, Britain as one of the co-guarantors of Belgian neutrality issued an ultimatum demanding that German forces leave Belgium at once; upon its rejection, Britain declared war on the Reich shortly before midnight on 4 August 1914. As a member of the British empire, Canada was automatically at war as well. Vanier took on a prominent role in recruiting others, eventually helping to organise in 1915 the French Canadian 22nd Battalion of the Canadian Expeditionary Force, of which he was commissioned as an officer, and which later, in 1920, became the Royal 22^{e} Régiment.

Through many French-Canadians were opposed to or at least lukewarm in their support of the war, for Vanier, France was the center of western civilization, and he felt compelled to volunteer to assist France with repelling the German invasion. In addition, Vanier was greatly offended by the German invasion of neutral Belgium, all the more so because Germany was one of the co-guarantors of Belgian neutrality, which led him to see the invasion of Belgium together with the atrocities against Belgian civilians as especially brutal acts. In a letter to his sister Frances, Vanier wrote: "I could not read the harrowing account if Belgian sufferings without feeling a deep compassion and an active desire to right, as so far as it is within my power, the heinous wrong done [to Belgium]". On 14 October 1914, Vanier attended the rally in Montreal's Parc Sohmer organized by a Canadian militia doctor, Arthur Mignault, where the lead speaker was the former prime minister, Sir Wilfrid Laurier, that led to the formation of the 22nd Battalion.

On 15 February 1915, Vanier passed the officers' exam and was commissioned as a lieutenant. On 20 May 1915, Vanier boarded in Halifax the ship HMT Saxonia that took him and the rest of the battalion across the Atlantic to Plymouth. In Britain, the battalion went to the East Sandling Camp in Kent for more training together with visits by King George V, the prime minister Sir Robert Borden, and the minister of national defense, Sam Hughes. On 13 September 1915, the battalion arrived in Le Havre and then boarded a train that took them to the front. On 2 January 1916, Vanier led a trench raid at night that took out a heavily fortified German machine-gun post as Vanier led his men across no-man's land, captured the post, blew it up, and then led his men back to the Canadian trenches. The success of the raid was widely reported in Montreal and even in the neutral United States where the Christian Science Monitor covered the raid with the headline "Canadian Exploits in Flanders Region". During a visit to Paris in January 1916, Vanier noted in a letter to his family the most disturbing aspect of Paris in wartime was the disproportionate number of women wearing black in morning for their husbands, boyfriends and sons who had been killed in the war. In the same letter, he expressed his love of France as he wrote: "Ah, the sheer joy of it-to visit Paris on leave from the trenches where we are all trying to do our bit for the triumph of civilization". Vanier sent his family a postcard where he wrote: "Affectionate greetings from Paris, the center of civilization". On 12 April 1916, Vanier made a will that began with: "I believe in God and the Holy Catholic Church. I believe in eternal rest and divine mercy. I confide my soul without fear to our Lord Jesus Christ. I renew all promises made at my baptism and confirmation. I believe in the sanctity of our cause and the triumph of justice. I believe in the future of French-Canada".

Vanier for his efforts, received the Military Cross (MC) on 3 June 1916, he continued fighting in the trenches. On 10 June 1916, Vanier was wounded by the explosion of a German shell, which led him to being assigned to a Trappist monastery that had converted into a hospital to recover. In his letters to his family, he spoke of his sense of peace as he heard the Trappist monks chant while he rested in the monastery's garden; in his diary, he wrote about feeling depressed at the sight of so much death and suffering that it made difficult for him to sleep at night. While on a visit to London later in June 1916, Vanier again collapsed from shell-shock and was sent to the Perkins Bull Hospital for Convalescent Canadian Officers in Putney Heath. Despite the efforts of his parents who had wanted to declare him medically unfit to continue fighting, Vanier chose to return to the front in July 1916, telling his parents: "I can't go back to Canada now with the boys fighting in France". In a letter to his brother Anthony, Vanier sent a post-card showing the execution of Edith Cavell in October 1915 that featured a cruel-looking German officer shooting the noble-looking Cavell with the comment "To Dear Antony, this is the sort of thing that makes one glad that he enlisted". Vanier saw the war as a "holy war" and a "sacred war" to defend freedom from tyranny with himself and the other Canadian soldiers as "knights" who had to perform the hard and gruesome, but very necessary task of winning the war. Vanier sent his brother an article from The Spectator claiming there was a straight line of continuity from the mythical heroes of the Trojan war such as Achilles and Odysseus to the medieval knights to the Allied soldiers currently fighting in the war. Vanier endorsed the claims made in the article, telling his brother that the article perfectly explained why he had chosen to fight in the war. For Vanier, the knightly ideal of a man who has to be courageous and honorable in upholding what is right and just in the world no matter what the cost was to be his lifelong ideal, and was to greatly influence his actions throughout his life. In September 1916, Vanier visited Windsor Castle where the king personally awarded him the Military Cross.

Vanier took part in the action that saw the Canadian Corps take Vimy Ridge on 9 April 1917. The ridge, which towered above the Douai Plain, allowed any force that occupied it to dominate the plain and had been held by the Germans since October 1914. Vimy Ridge had become one of the most heavily fortified places on the Western Front, and French attempts to capture Vimy ridge in 1915 together with British attempts in 1916 had been repulsed with heavy losses, turning Vimy Ridge into a symbol of German power. Vanier was elated by the fall of Vimy and in a letter to his mother wrote: "You know of course that things are going with a tremendous swing, and that we are pursuing the Boche. The morale of our troops is magnificent. We cannot lose-what is more we are winning quickly and the war will be over in six months".

In July 1917, he was appointed a knight (chevalier) of the French Legion of Honour. In late 1918, he led an attack at Chérisy and was shot in the chest and both legs, resulting in the loss of his right leg due to a shell blast. His recovery was lengthy, though he spent it in France, refusing to be evacuated while his fellow soldiers remained fighting. With the cessations of hostilities, Vanier was mentioned in dispatches and was awarded a Bar to his Military Cross for his bravery during this action:

Captain (Acting Major) George Phileas Vanier, D.S.O., M.C., 22nd Battalion, Quebec Regiment, Canadian Infantry For conspicuous gallantry and devotion to duty. The battalion commander having become a casualty, this officer organised the remnants of the battalion which had suffered heavily the previous day, and led the men in the second attack with great dash. He was first seriously wounded in the side, but carried on until severely wounded in both legs.

He was further appointed to the Distinguished Service Order (DSO):

Captain (Acting Major) George Phileas Vanier, M.C., 22nd Battalion, Canadian Infantry, Quebec Regiment For conspicuous gallantry and devotion to duty. As second in command he led a portion of the battalion to the attack and capture of a village. The O.C. [Officer Commanding] the battalion being then called to the command of [a] brigade, this officer took charge of the battalion and led it with great skill to the attack and capture of a large village. His courage, example and will to conquer imbued all under him with the finest fighting spirit.

Thereafter, Vanier returned to Montreal and once more found employment practicing law. On 1 April 1920, he received a regular commission as a major in the Canadian Militia. On 29 September 1921, he married Pauline Archer and the couple had five children, including Thérèse Vanier and Jean Vanier.

For four years beginning in 1921, Vanier acted as aide-de-camp to Governor General the Viscount Byng of Vimy, leaving this post when he was promoted to the rank of lieutenant colonel and took command of the Royal 22^{e} Régiment at La Citadelle. Vanier occupied that position for only one year before again becoming aide-de-camp for Byng's viceregal successor, the Marquess of Willingdon. Vanier was very close to Lord Byng, who had commanded the Canadian Corps in 1916–1917. During the King-Byng affair of 1926, Vanier felt that the charges of William Lyon Mackenzie King that Byng had acted illegally in not dissolving the House of Commons for a new election as Mackenzie King had asked to do were absurd. He then went to England where he attended the Staff College, Camberley, from 1923 to 1924, where Harry Crerar, later Chief of the General Staff and commander of the First Canadian Army during World War II, was a fellow student and J. F. C. Fuller was an instructor.

== Diplomatic career ==
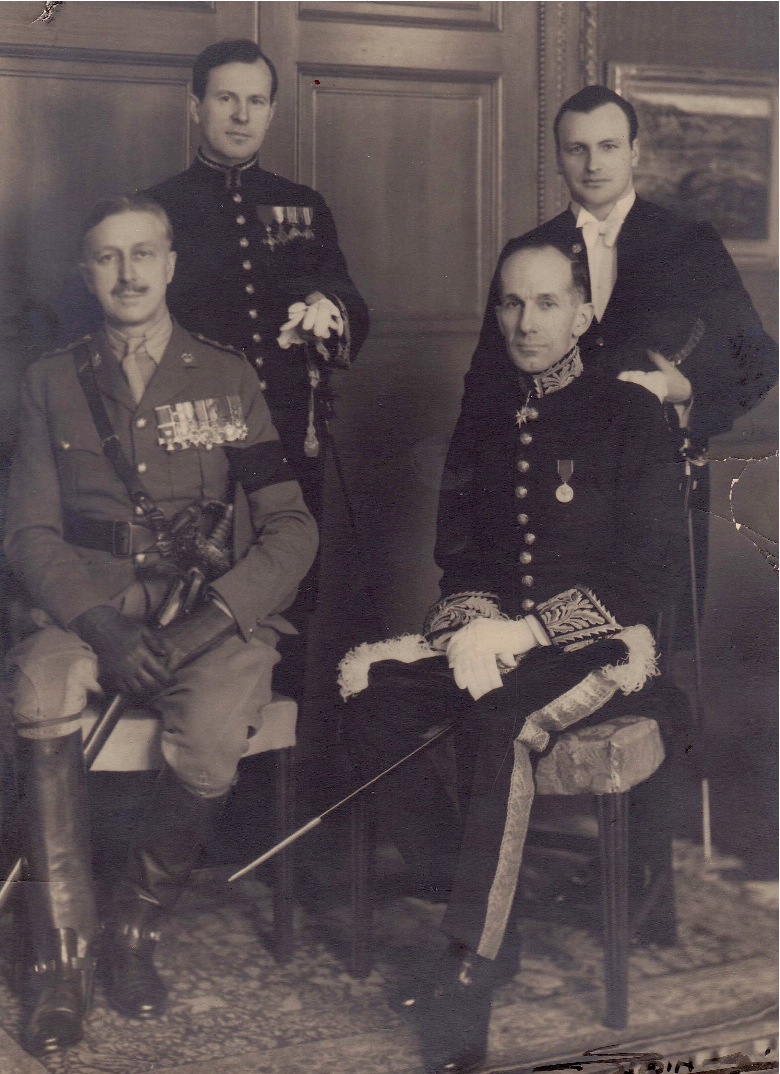
Vanier with (clockwise from top left) Lester B. Pearson, John Ross McLean and Vincent Massey at Canada House in London, 1938

In 1928, Vanier was appointed to Canada's military delegation for disarmament to the League of Nations and in 1930, he was named secretary to the High Commission of Canada in London, remaining at that post for nearly a decade, approximately half of which he spent serving the man who would eventually immediately precede him as governor general of Canada, Vincent Massey. Vanier's relations with Massey were described as "cordial", through never close as Vanier found Massey to be a snob who was inordinately proud of the fact he was a scion of the famous Massey family and that he attended Balliol College at Oxford. In 1935, when Byng died, Vanier wrote a tribute for him that appeared in The Times of London that praised him as the victor of Vimy and as the governor-general of Canada.

In the tumultuous year of 1936, King George V died; and his son, Prince Edward, Prince of Wales, acceded and then abdicated in favour of his younger brother, Prince Albert, Duke of York. On 12 May 1937, Vanier, along with his son, Jean, watched from the roof of Canada House the coronation parade of their new king, George VI. In the procession below, Vanier would have seen one of the future governors general of Canada, Harold Alexander, who was then the personal aide-de-camp to the King.

In January 1939, Vanier was elevated to the position of the King's Envoy Extraordinary and Minister Plenipotentiary to France. In April 1939, he wrote to Mackenzie King: "if the British guarantee to Poland puts an end to German expansion through the threat of force, it also puts an end to the policy of non-inference and carries with it the definite risk of precipitating war". As the Danzig crisis gathered steam during the summer of 1939, Vanier sent his wife Pauline and their children to take their summer vacation in Varengeville in Normandy, saying it was far too dangerous to take a vacation in Paris, which might be bombed should the crisis turn to war. On 26 August 1939, Vanier sent a dispatch to Ottawa simply saying "it looks like war" was inevitable.

With the outbreak of Second World War, Vanier was surprised by the Phoney War. On 10 May 1940, Germany invaded France, but Vanier expected the offensive to be halted. On 16 May 1940, Vanier was informed by the French Ministry of Foreign Affairs that he should burn all of the secret documents at the Canadian Legation as there was a real possibility that the Wehrmacht might take Paris at any moment, leading Vanier to toss all of the secret papers into the basement furnace of the legation later that day. When he walked over the Quai d'Orsay, he was astonished by the sight of the huge bonfire in the Foreign Ministry's courtyard. Vanier had the staff of the legation prepared to leave Paris at any moment. At the same time, he found the legation surrounded by thousands of refugees asking for papers to depart for Canada. Many of the people waiting outside of the legation were Jewish refugees from Germany who had settled in France and on 24 May 1940, Vanier wrote to Mackenzie King that "there is a wonderful opportunity for Canada" to take action by providing financial assistance and asylum for the refugees. In a cabinet discussion of Vanier's appeal, Mackenzie King dismissed it under the grounds that Vanier's dispatch was "very muddled in thought and expression...far too wide and undertook far too in the way of government obligation". On the next day, 25 May 1940, Mackenzie King agreed to accept 10,000 refugee children provided they were British, French, Belgian or Dutch. Vanier was informed by Mackenzie King that "it would possible to take in a certain number of children of French descent" became "some thousands" of French children could be settled in Quebec without causing any controversy in la belle province.

On 9 June 1940, Vanier met with General Maxime Weygand who told him that Paris would probably fall within the next week. On 10 June 1940, it was announced that the French government was relocating to Tours, and as such Vanier ordered the legation staff to leave Paris. Vanier's last act in Paris was to see the American ambassador to France, William Christian Bullitt Jr., to hand over the papers giving him the legal power to represent Canada in occupied France. Vanier attached a poster to the front door of the legation saying "All Canadian government services have been evacuated from Paris", and then boarded the automobile that was to take him to Pernay, where he decided the legation would be relocated.

The drive from Paris to Pernay, which normally took 3 hours, instead took 17 hours as the roads were overwhelmed with refugees. On 14 June 1940, Vanier learned that the Wehrmacht had taken Paris and had almost reached Tours, leading him to tell his wife Pauline to take herself and their children to Bordeaux. On 15 June, Vanier went to the village of Margaux outside of Bordeaux, where he was reunited with his family. The Vaniers stayed in the village of Cantenac, where the family was forced to sleep on the floor of the maire for the next two nights owing to a lack of housing. On 17 June, Paul Reynaud resigned as premier and was replaced by Marshal Philippe Pétain, whose first act was to announce that his government would seek an armistice with Germany. The Vanier family boarded a boat at Le Verdon-sur-Mer that took them to Britain.

With the Nazi occupation of France in 1940, Vanier and his wife fled to the United Kingdom and then back to Canada in 1941, where he was commissioned as commander of the military district of Quebec and began an early policy of bilingualism in the army. The next year Vanier was promoted to the rank of major general and then made the Canadian Envoy Extraordinary and Minister Plenipotentiary to the governments of Belgium, Czechoslovakia, Greece, the Netherlands, Norway, Poland, and Yugoslavia, as well as the representative of the Canadian government to the Free French and later the Conseil National de la Résistance, all of which were governments in exile. Both Georges and Pauline Vanier pressed for Canada to accept refugees during the war. To the frustration of the Vaniers, these efforts were met predominantly with indifference and even anger, and Vanier's letters to Prime Minister William Lyon Mackenzie King, failed to induce a change in Canada's immigration policies.

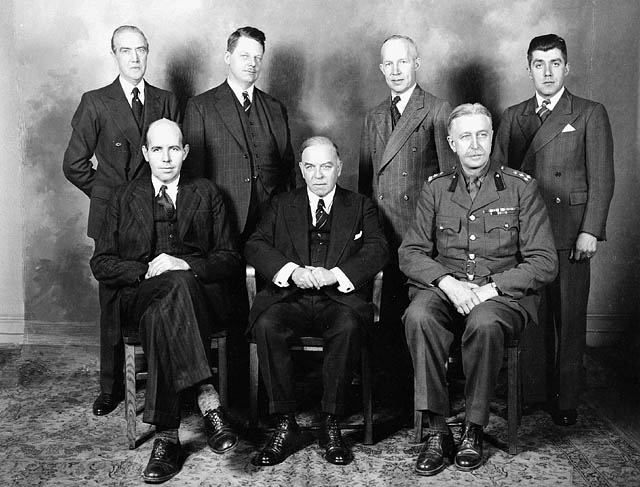
Vanier (seated, right), with William Lyon Mackenzie King (seated, centre), and other members of the Canadian delegation dispatched to the United Kingdom to discuss war planning, 1941

A major issue in Franco-Canadian relations were that the Canada continued to recognize the Vichy government as the legitimate government of France and only broke diplomatic relations with Vichy on 9 November 1942. Vanier was in disagreement with Mackenzie King's policy of recognizing Vichy and several times suggested that Canada should recognize the Free French movement led by Charles de Gaulle. In the summer of 1940, Vanier became friendly with the Free French general Philippe Leclerc de Hauteclocque, who told him that de Gaulle was planning to conquer the French colony of Cameroon held by a governor loyal to the Vichy regime in order to booster his claim to be the legitimate French leader and in the process acquire a source of manpower to continue the war. The Vanier family was so close to Leclerc that the Vanier children took to calling him "Uncle Philippe".

Vanier commented that President Edvard Beneš of Czechoslovakia "had the genius for being everywhere" as Beneš was very active in various committees for planning a post-war Europe. Vanier found that Beneš was a deeply embittered and angry man obsessed with the "betrayal" of the Munich Agreement. Through Beneš expressed much hatred of Neville Chamberlain, whom he blamed the most for the Munich Agreement, he also spoke about the "collective guilt" of the Sudeten Germans whose loyalty to Czechoslovakia had proved to be wanting in 1938. Beneš spoke frankly to Vanier about his desire to expel all of the Sudeten Germans after the war, saying that it was possible for Canada to be shared by different peoples, but not in Czechoslovakia. In common with many other diplomats whom found Beneš somewhat stiff and stubborn, Vanier preferred the company of the Czechoslovak foreign minister Jan Masaryk who was friendly and outgoing, through he sometimes found Masaryk's sense of humor too vulgar for his tastes. Vanier had a strong liking for the romantic young King Petar II of Yugoslavia, whose restoration he supported, through he also felt the Yugoslav prime minister, Božidar Purić, was not a leader. Vanier saw parallels between Yugoslavia and its various peoples with Canada, and thought the King Petar could serve as a rallying figure to hold his nation together. Vanier tended to sympathize with the Polish prime minister, General Władysław Sikorski against what he called the "red hand of Stalin". Vanier found the Greek cabinet, which was torn by endless in-fighting between Royalists and Venezilists, to be tiresome and troubling.

Vanier was a friend and admirer of Charles de Gaulle, whose cause he championed over the opposition of Mackenzie King, who made little effort to hide his dislike and distrust of de Gaulle. Mackenzie King had a deep love of the United States and especially admired President Franklin D. Roosevelt, whose lead he tended to follow. Roosevelt had a strong aversion to de Gaulle and throughout the Second World War, American officials had an "anybody but de Gaulle" attitude towards the question of future leaders of France. In May 1943, the United States was conspicuously absent among the Allies in refusing to recognize de Gaulle's government-in-exile based in Algiers as the legitimate government of France. Vanier often pressed Mackenzie King to support the Free French and not to worry so much about American objections. After René Massigli, the French foreign minister, told him that not to recognize de Gaulle's government-in-exile was tantamount to handing France over to the Communists after the war, Vanier pressed Mackenzie King very strongly for Canadian recognition of the Conseil National de la Résistance. Mackenzie King told Vanier that he would only recognize de Gaulle's government if the United States did so first, much to Vanier's vexation who warned that de Gaulle was a proud man who would not forgive such a slight.

In a dispatch to Ottawa, Vanier wrote: "Ever since I came to Algiers I have been endeavoring to prove to the department that the only reasonable course for us to follow was to acknowledge the Committee as the future and later de facto administrator of France after the Liberation". Together with Alfred Duff Cooper, the British ambassador in Algiers, Vanier pressed very strongly for a greater French role in Operation Overlord, wanting a French division under the command of Leclerc to take part. Vanier wrote: "The absence of an important body of French troops in the northern area will be to the French people a crowning humiliation that will be neither understood nor forgotten irrespective of all reasons or excuses which may be put forward. I submit that the Canadian government would render a great service to France by making every effort to obtain the inclusion of at least one French division in the north". Despite the best efforts of Duff Cooper and Vanier, it was decided that it would be impossible to have a French division land in Normandy as part of the first wave of Allied troops, but that the 1er Bataillon de Fusiliers Marins Commandos would take part in the first wave and that an armored division under Leclerc would join the Normandy campaign at a later day after the first landings. Vanier was in Algiers when he heard the news that Operation Overlord had begun on 6 June 1944 with the Allies successfully landing in Normandy. Vanier reported a mixture of feelings at the news with relief that the liberation of France had finally begun together with a feeling of sadness as the old soldier Vanier knew the Normandy campaign would bring death and suffering to both soldiers and civilians as indeed it did.

In the summer of 1944, Vanier made two trips to Italy, both to see his old regiment, the Royal 22nd, which had fighting in Italy as part of the 1st Canadian Division. During his second visit, Vanier had an audience with Pope Pius XII in Rome. On 24 August 1944, Leclerc's division entered Paris to accept the surrender of the German commander, General Dietrich von Choltiz. The swastika flag that had flying over the Eiffel Tower since 1940 had been taken down, to be replaced with the Tricolour. Pauline Vanier in a letter to her children that both she and their father "had behaved like lunatics" at the news. Pauline Vanier ended her letter: "This morning we hear that Leclerc's division has entered Paris, that Romania has capitulated, that Marseille has been liberated, that Grenoble has been taken, that we are marching on Lyon, that Lisieux is taken, that we are nearing Le Havre, that another column is going up towards Lille. Oh me! It is nearly too much emotion at once!". On 2 September 1944, Vanier left Algiers for a brief visit to London and then returned to Paris, a city that he had not seen since 1940. Both the Vaniers were shocked to see how famished the ordinary people of France were as under the occupation it was official policy to ensure that people in Germany were amply supplied with French food with the French being told to live on whatever was left, though Vanier noted with disgust that the French upper classes had been able to stay well fed via the black market. One of Vanier's first acts upon arriving in France was to go to Dieppe to pay his respects to the Canadian soldiers buried there, having been killed in a disastrous raid on Dieppe that took place on 19 August 1942. Both the Vaniers broke down in tears when The Last Post was played while laying flowers upon the graves of the fallen soldiers. Likewise, the Vaniers were moved to tears when they visited the ruins of Caen, which had almost completely destroyed during the Battle of Caen, but where the ordinary people greeted them with cries of "Vive le Canada!" ("Long Live Canada!"). Vanier's attempts to contact the man who worked as his chauffeur during his first time in Paris in 1939–1940 were unsuccessful as his chauffeur was Jewish and Vanier learned that he and his family had been deported for "resettlement in the East", which was the last that anybody had heard of them.

Following the fall of Vichy France in 1944 to the Allied forces, Vanier was posted as Canada's first ambassador to France. While serving in that role, as well as acting as Canada's representative to the United Nations, he toured in April 1945 the recently liberated Buchenwald concentration camp. Vanier had been sent to Buchenwald to investigate reports that three Canadians serving with the Special Operations Executive (SOE) had been executed there, but reported to Ottawa that he saw "naked bodies piled like so much cord wood and on which lime was thrown". Vanier reported that the survivors were emaciated "walking skeletons" whose bones that protruded through their skin made it impossible for them to stay in one position for very long and that he could see "how their knee and ankle joints held together". Vanier talked to a number Polish Jewish child survivors and in his report stated: "Some had been in the prison camp for years. Those of ten and over worked as slave laborers on munitions. Not one as far I know, had any idea of where his parents were; in view of the barbarous treatment inflicted on the Poles and Jews by the Germans, it is quite possible that they have all been done to death". As for the three missing SOE agents, Vanier discovered that Frank Pickersgill of Winnipeg, John Macalister of Guelph and Guy Sabourin of Montreal had all been tortured and executed at Buchenwald in September 1944.

On a return trip to Canada, he delivered via the Canadian Broadcasting Corporation a speech expressing his shame over Canada's inaction, saying: "How deaf we were then, to cruelty and the cries of pain which came to our ears, grim forerunners of the mass torture and murders which were to follow." Back in Paris, he and his wife continued to help the refugees who arrived at the embassy, arranging for them food and temporary shelter. The couple, with the assistance of numerous others, eventually pushed the government of Canada to revise the regulations of immigration and more than 186,000 European refugees settled in Canada between 1947 and 1953. In the aftermath of the occupation, many people in France were on the brink of starvation and the Vaniers were very active in ensuring that food was sent from Canada to France to prevent a famine.

As ambassador to France, Vanier supported the French policy in Vietnam, through in common with other Canadian diplomats he felt it better that the French provide independence to Vietnam instead of trying to force Vietnam to accept being a French colony. Like other Canadian diplomats, Vanier saw the Commonwealth as the model solution, believing in the same way the Dominions were independent, but united by having the British monarch as their head of state that a similar system was needed for the French empire. As there were no Canadian diplomats stationed in Indochina, most of what the Canadian government knew what was happening in Vietnam came from Vanier's reports in Paris. In January 1949, Vanier reported it was impossible for the French to negotiate with Ho Chi Minh and the Emperor Bảo Đại was "the only political figure whom the French could negotiate with". In 1949, an agreement was struck under which the United States would pay most of the costs associated with the war in Indochina in exchange for the French granting a nominal independence to Vietnam under the Emperor Bao Dao. In November 1949, Vanier reported to Canadian External Affairs minister Lester B. Pearson: "Although the Bao Dao experiment has not obtained much success thus far, I am inclined to endorse the efforts of the French government to establish some prestige for the Bao Dao government. The French assertion that there is no suitable alternative policy at the present seems to be true". Vanier strongly supported Canadian recognition of the State of Vietnam, arguing that recognizing Bao's government would assist the French with obtaining funds from "a U.S. military aid bill" that was being debated in Congress.

It was in 1953 that Vanier retired from diplomatic service and returned to Montreal, though he and his wife continued social work there. Vanier sat as a director of the Bank of Montreal, the Credit Foncier Franco-Canadien, and the Standard Life Assurance Company, and served on the Canada Council for the Arts.

== Governor General of Canada ==
Vanier was the first Quebec-born governor general of Canada, his bilingualism proving to be an asset to his mandate of fostering Canadian unity. Following on that of Vincent Massey, an anglophone, the appointment of Vanier established the tradition of alternating between French and English speaking persons. Although Vanier's bilingual upbringing made him as much of an anglophone as he was a francophone, his appointment was considered francophone representation. Vanier's tenure was marked by economic problems plaguing the country and a succession of minority governments, but the greatest threats to Confederation came from the rise of the Quiet Revolution, Quebec nationalism, and the Quebec sovereignty movement, including the terrorist actions of the Front de libération du Québec; indeed, as a Québécois representing the Canadian monarch and someone who promoted federalism, he was perceived by many Quebec separatists to be a traitor to his people. Amongst most other circles in the country, however, he was lauded as a distinguished viceroy.

=== As governor general-designate ===
The appointment of Vanier as governor general was announced on 1 August 1959, at Halifax, Nova Scotia, during a meeting of the Queen's Privy Council for Canada at which Queen Elizabeth II was present and, by commission under the royal sign-manual and Great Seal of Canada, approved of Vanier as her representative. In spite of the challenges of poor health and political unrest in Canada, the Major-General said of his commission to represent the Queen: "If God wants me to do this job, He will give me the strength to do it."

Though Vanier's name had been raised as a candidate for the viceregal role as early as William Lyon Mackenzie King's time as prime minister and it was suspected King's successor, Louis St. Laurent, was considering Vanier to replace Massey, the Liberal Party lost the 1957 and 1958 elections, leading to the leader of the Progressive Conservative Party, John Diefenbaker, to be appointed and then remain premier; it was then thought unlikely that Vanier would be made governor general, especially as he was a staunch Liberal Party supporter. The announcement of the Major-General's appointment thus surprised Ottawa insiders and the media. Diefenbaker, however, felt that more Francophone representation was needed in Canada's government; in his memoirs, he wrote he had considered a non-English-Canadian for the post and attributed his decision to put forward Vanier for appointment to a chance meeting with the Major-General. There was some objection to the appointment of a devout Roman Catholic. The Queen's private secretary at the time, Alan Lascelles, predicted Vanier would be "the best governor general in Canadian history."

=== In office ===
He was sworn in the Senate Chamber on 15 September 1959 in the presence of Prime Minister John Diefenbaker. He had presided over a farewell dinner for his predecessor the previous evening. During the ceremony, the commission by the Queen that was signed during her royal visit the prior month for Vanier's appointment was read aloud in the chamber. He was given a royal salute following the proceedings, provided by the 1st Battalion, Canadian Guards and the Band of the Royal Canadian Ordnance Corps. Vanier had a fiercely protective attitude towards Queen Elizabeth II, whom he called "our little queen", seeing it as his duty to serve and look after. Vanier's attitude was in large part based on the fact that Elizabeth was the third generation of the House of Windsor that he had served, as he previously served George VI (the queen's father) and George V (the queen's grandfather), leading to see himself as an elderly "knight" whose duty was to offer the monarch all of the expertise he had acquired during his life. Vanier used as his guide the 1867 book The English Constitution by Walter Bagehot as to what were the powers of the governor-general as the representative of the monarch in Canada.

Upon taking up residence at Rideau Hall, Vanier asked that a bilingual sign be placed at the main gates to the royal and viceroyal residence and that a chapel for offering Mass be constructed somewhere on the property, two requests that reflected two dominant forces in Vanier's life: religion and Canadian unity. When he was in residence, Vanier would pray twice daily in the chapel that was eventually fit into the palace's second floor and, at a time when the Canadian federation was under threat from separatists factions in Quebec, Vanier delivered numerous speeches, in both French and English, and infused with words praising the co-habitation of Anglophone and Francophone Canadians; in one of the last orations he gave, he said: "The road of unity is the road of love: love of one's country and faith in its future will give new direction and purpose to our lives, lift us above our domestic quarrels, and unite us in dedication to the common good... I pray God that we may all go forward hand in hand. We can't run the risk of this great country falling into pieces." Words like these, though, earned Vanier the ire of Quebec nationalists, as demonstrated when, on Saint-Jean-Baptiste Day in 1964, he found himself the target of such people in Montreal, who held placards reading "Vanier vendu" ("Vanier traitor" or "Vanier sellout") and "Vanier fou de la Reine" ("Vanier Queen's jester").

Despite his poor health (Vanier had a heart condition), and his doctor's warnings about strain, Vanier travelled across Canada, gaining the affection of Canadians. As part of his official duties, Vanier, along with the Queen, attended the inauguration of the Saint Lawrence Seaway on 26 June 1959 and, in June 1965, the same year he inaugurated the new national flag, was made Chief Big Eagle of the Blackfoot tribe in Calgary. He was also active in encouraging children to achieve, using his role as The Boy Scouts Association Canadian branch's Chief Scout of Canada to this end. His and his wife's concern for family life drew them to founding in 1964 the Canadian Conference of the Family, which eventually became the Vanier Institute of the Family. As the representative of the head of state, Vanier hosted a list of official guests, including United States president John Kennedy and Jacqueline Kennedy; the Emperor of Ethiopia, Haile Selassie; David Ben-Gurion, Prime Minister of Israel; the Shah of Iran; and General Charles de Gaulle, President of France. His assistant private secretary from 1960 to 1962 was Lord Hylton.

=== Death ===
By 1966, though his itinerary remained unreduced, Vanier's strength was failing. On 4 March 1967, before watching a Montreal Canadiens game on television at Rideau Hall, Vanier had conversed with his prime minister at the time, Lester B. Pearson, and had expressed to him that he was willing to continue on as governor general until the end of the centennial year. Given Vanier's physical state, Pearson was hesitant to advise the Queen to act along those lines, but his worry was short lived, as the following day, after hearing the Holy Sacrifice of the Mass and receiving Holy Communion in the chapel, the Governor General died. With Robert Taschereau, Chief Justice of Canada, acting as Administrator of the Government, more than 15,000 messages of sympathy were received at Rideau Hall.

Following a state funeral at the Notre-Dame Cathedral Basilica on 8 March 1967, the Major-General was buried at La Citadelle's commemorative chapel on 5 May of the same year. Though Vanier had earlier hosted the French president at Government House, neither de Gaulle nor any representative was sent to attend the funeral, which was read by Canadian diplomatic officials as a hint that there had been a change in Canada–France relations and instigated the chain of events that would culminate in de Gaulle's "Vive le Québec libre" speech in Montreal later that year.

== Legacy ==
When, in 1999, Maclean's compiled a list of the 100 most influential Canadians of all time, Vanier was placed by the editors at position number one. His time in the Office of the Governor General saw the creation of a number of awards that reflected the Major-General's interests. He was an avid fan of sport and, though his favourite was hockey and specifically the Montreal Canadiens, Vanier instigated in 1965 the Governor General's Fencing Award and the Vanier Cup for the university football championship in the Canadian Intercollegiate Athletic Union. To recognise excellence in more bureaucratic endeavours, Vanier initiated in 1962 the Vanier Medal of the Institute of Public Administration of Canada and, in 1967, the Vanier Awards for Outstanding Young Canadians, awarded to deserving individuals in the Canadian Junior Chamber of Commerce.

Vanier and his wife, Pauline are seen by many Canadian Catholics as potential candidates for sainthood in the Catholic Church because of their piety and love for humanity, and the Newman Center at the University of Toronto has stained glass windows depicting the Vanier couple.

The Place Vanier student residence at the University of British Columbia was named in honor of Georges Vanier.

Jon Kay noted that " Jeremy Kinsman argues that it was the francophone Georges Vanier—not his well-heeled anglophone nemesis, Vincent Massey—who fought for the Canadian admission of Jewish refugees in the aftermath of World War II, and who forged in the crucible of wartime suffering a humanist creed that foreshadowed modern Canadian multiculturalism."

== Ranks, honours, and arms ==
=== Military ranks ===
- 1914–1915: Private
- 1914: Lieutenant
- 1915–1916: Temporary captain
- 1916–1918: Acting major
- 1918–1920: Temporary major
- 1920–1924: Major
- 1924–1942: Lieutenant colonel
- 1942–1964: Major general
- 1964–1967: General

=== Honours and awards ===
- (United Kingdom) 1919 – 5 March 1967: Companion of the Distinguished Service Order (DSO)
- 15 September 1959 – 5 March 1967: Knight of Justice, Prior, and Chief Officer in Canada of the Most Venerable Order of the Hospital of Saint John of Jerusalem
- 15 September 1959 – 5 March 1967: Chief Scout of Canada
- 1959 – 5 March 1967: Honorary Member of the Royal Military College of Canada Club
- (United Kingdom) 1963 – 5 March 1967: Member of Her Majesty's Most Honourable Privy Council (PC)
- (Canada) 1965 – 5 March 1967: Chief of the Blackfoot Tribe

Decorations

- (United Kingdom) 1916: Military Cross (MC)
- (United Kingdom) 1919: Military Cross (MC & Bar)
- (Canada) 27 July 1950: Canadian Forces' Decoration (CD) with two clasps signifying over 32 years of service (though possibly entitled to a third clasp, owing to service as Honorary Colonel and Colonel of the Regiment for the R22eR).

Medals

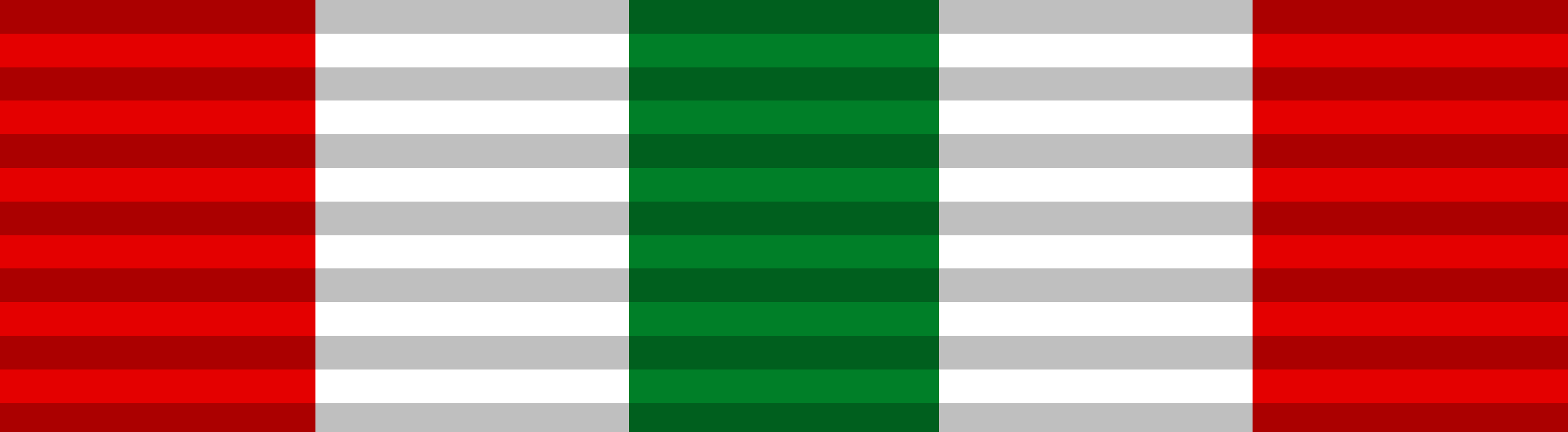

Ribbon	Description	Notes
	Distinguished Service Order (DSO)	1919
	Military Cross (MC)	1916; 1919 (Second Issue)
	Order of St John	Knight of Justice, Prior, and Chief Officer in Canada
	1914–15 Star	
	British War Medal	
	World War I Victory Medal	With MID Oakleaf
	1939–45 Star	
	Italy Star	
	France and Germany Star	
	Defence Medal	
	Canadian Volunteer Service Medal	With Overseas Clasp
	War Medal 1939–1945	
	King George V Silver Jubilee Medal	1935
	King George VI Coronation Medal	1937
	Queen Elizabeth II Coronation Medal	1953
	Canadian Forces' Decoration (CD)	2 Clasps; 32 years of service in the Canadian Forces
	Legion d'Honneur (Knight)	1917
	Legion of Merit	1946; Degree of Commander; From United States of America

Foreign honours

- (France) 1917: Knight of the National Order of the Legion of Honour
- (United States) 1946: Commander of the Legion of Merit
- 1959: Knight Grand Cross of Magistral Grace of the Sovereign Military Hospitaller Order of Saint John of Jerusalem, of Rhodes and of Malta

Monuments

- Canada: Statue, Citadelle of Quebec, Quebec City

==== Honorary military appointments ====
- (Canada) 9 September 1921 – 24 November 1922: Personal Aide-de-Camp to His Excellency the Governor General (AdC)
- (Canada) 9 May 1925 – 1928: Honorary Aide-de-Camp to His Excellency the Governor General (AdC)
- (Canada) 21 February 1952 – 31 August 1958: Honorary Colonel of the Royal 22nd Regiment
- (Canada) 1 September 1958 – 22 October 1964: Colonel of the Royal 22nd Regiment
- (Canada) 15 September 1959 – 5 March 1967: Colonel of the Governor General's Horse Guards
- (Canada) 15 September 1959 – 5 March 1967: Colonel of the Governor General's Foot Guards
- (Canada) 15 September 1959 – 5 March 1967: Colonel of the Canadian Grenadier Guards

==== Honorary degrees ====
- (Canada) : University of Toronto, Doctor of Laws (LLD)
- (Nova Scotia) 13 May 1966: Saint Mary's University, Doctor of Laws (LLD)

==== Honorific eponyms ====
Awards

- Canada: Vanier Award for Outstanding Achievement by a Canadian under 40
- Canada: Vanier Medal of the Institute of Public Administration of Canada
- Canada: Vanier Cup
- Canada: Vanier Canada Graduate Scholarships
- In 1963, Vanier became the first recipient of the Loyola Medal from Loyola College, one of Concordia University's founding institutions.

Buildings

- British Columbia: Vanier Hall, Prince George
- British Columbia: Place Vanier, University of British Columbia, Vancouver
- Ontario: Place Vanier, Ottawa
- Ontario: Vanier Hall, University of Ottawa, Ottawa
- Quebec: Vanier Pavilion, Royal Military College Saint-Jean, Saint-Jean-sur-Richelieu

Geographic locations

- British Columbia: Vanier Drive, Prince George
- British Columbia: Place Vanier, Vancouver
- British Columbia: Vanier Park, Vancouver
- New Brunswick: Vanier Highway, Fredericton
- New Brunswick: Vanier Street, Dieppe
- New Brunswick: Vanier Boulevard, Bathurst
- Ontario: Rideau-Vanier Ward, Ottawa
- Ontario: Vanier Parkway, Ottawa
- Ontario: Vanier (merged with Ottawa in 2001)
- Quebec: Vanier Road, Aylmer
- Quebec: Georges-Vanier Métro station, Montreal
- Quebec: Chemin Vanier, Gatineau
- Quebec: Rue Georges-Vanier, Chicoutimi
- Quebec: Rue Georges-Vanier, Shawinigan
- Quebec: Vanier (merged with Quebec City in 2002)
- Quebec:Rue Général-Vanier, Magog, Quebec
- Quebec:Rue Général-Vanier, Asbestos, Quebec
- Quebec:Rue Général Vanier, Saint-Sauveur, Quebec
- Saskatchewan: Vanier Drive and Place, Melville
- Saskatchewan: Vanier Drive, Regina
- Saskatchewan: Vanier Crescent, Saskatoon

Organisations

- Canada: Governor General Georges-P. Vanier Royal Canadian Air Cadet Squadron
- Ontario: Royal Canadian Legion Branch 472 Georges Vanier
- Canada: Vanier Institute of the Family

Schools

- Alberta: Georges P. Vanier Junior High School, Calgary
- Alberta: Georges P. Vanier Secondary School, Donnelly
- Alberta: Georges P. Vanier School, Medicine Hat (1960–2010)
- Alberta: Vanier Community Catholic School Edson
- British Columbia: Georges P. Vanier Secondary School, Courtenay
- British Columbia: Georges Vanier Elementary School, Surrey
- Manitoba: General Vanier Elementary School, Winnipeg
- Manitoba: General Vanier School, Winnipeg
- Newfoundland and Labrador: Vanier Elementary School, St. John's
- New Brunswick: Vanier Middle School, Moncton (closed in 2005) Formerly École secondaire Vanier High School (1963–1972) (destroyed in 2014)
- Nova Scotia: Georges P. Vanier Junior High School, Fall River
- Ontario: École Georges Vanier, Elliot Lake
- Ontario: École secondaire Georges-P.-Vanier, Hamilton
- Ontario: General Vanier Intermediate School, Cornwall
- Ontario: General Vanier Public School, Fort Erie
- Ontario: General Vanier Public School, Ottawa
- Ontario: Georges P. Vanier Catholic School, Chatham
- Ontario: Georges Vanier Catholic School, Belleville
- Ontario: Georges Vanier Catholic School, Ottawa
- Ontario: Georges Vanier Public School, Lively
- Ontario: Georges Vanier Secondary School, Toronto
- Ontario: L'École catholique Georges-Vanier, Smooth Rock Falls
- Ontario: Vanier College, York University, Toronto
- Ontario: Vanier Public School, Brockville
- Ontario: Vanier School of Nursing, Algonquin College, Ottawa
- Quebec: Ecole Primaire Georges-P.-Vanier, Brossard
- Quebec: École secondaire Georges-Vanier, Laval
- Quebec: General Vanier Elementary School, St. Leonard
- Quebec: Georges-Vanier High School, Montreal
- Quebec: Massey-Vanier High School, Cowansville
- Quebec: Vanier College, Montreal
- Saskatchewan: Vanier Collegiate Institute, Moose Jaw
- Saskatchewan: Georges Vanier School, Saskatoon
- Yukon: Vanier Catholic Secondary School, Whitehorse
- Germany: École General Georges Vanier, Lahr, Germany (closed in 1993)

Under honours Governor General Vanier would have received the 1939–1945 War Medal for 28 days service during the Second World War. It is missing on the ribbon chart.

=== Arms ===
Coat of arms of Georges Vanier
Notes As Vanier served as governor general prior to the establishment of the Canadian Heraldic Authority, he was granted a coat of arms by the body previously responsible for heraldry in Canada: the College of Arms, in London, United Kingdom. These were later reworked by Alan Beddoe. Adopted 1 February 1961 Crest The tower of the Church of St. Catherine at Honfleur with buttresses all Or. Escutcheon Or, a Chevron paly Azure and Gules of eight pieces charged with two swords Or between a fleur-de-lys Azure in dexter, trefoil Vert in sinister and in base the gate of La Citadelle of Quebec surmounted by the standard of the Governor General of Canada proper; in chief an oak tree proper. Motto FIAT VOLUNTAS DEI (May God's Will Be Done) Symbolism The bell tower of the Church of Honfleur symbolises Vanier's Catholic faith, as well serving as a reminder of the first Governor of New France, Samuel de Champlain, who set sail for the New World from Honfleur. The tree represents knowledge and growth, while the Fleur de Lys recalls Vanier's French Canadian heritage. The swords evoke Vanier's active service in the military, while the gate of La Citadelle stands not only for the Quebec residence of the Governor General, but also the base of the Royal 22^{e} Régiment, which Vanier helped to form and later commanded at La Citadelle. The flag above the gate is the personal standard of the governor general, symbolising that Vanier served as the monarch's viceroy.

== Books ==
- Abella, Irving; Troper, Harold (2012). None is Too Many Canada and the Jews of Europe, 1933–1948. Toronto: University of Toronto Press. ISBN 9781442614079.
- Campbell, David (2007). "The 2nd Canadian Division: A "Most Spectacular Battle"". In Andrew Iarocci; Geoffrey Hayes; Mike Bechthold (eds.). Vimy Ridge A Canadian Reassessment. Waterloo: Wilfrid Laurier University Press. pp. 171–192. ISBN 9781554580958.
- Coady, Mary Frances (2011). Georges and Pauline Vanier Portrait of a Couple. Montreal: McGill University Press. ISBN 978-0773585799.
- Lee, Steven (1996). Outposts of Empire Korea, Vietnam, and the Origins of the Cold War in Asia, 1949-1954. Montreal: McGill University Press. ISBN 9780773566088.
- Price, John (2011). Orienting Canada Race, Empire, and the Transpacific. Vancouver: University of British Columbia Press. ISBN 9780774819862.
- Speaight, Robert (1970). Vanier: Soldier, Diplomat and Governor General A Biography. Toronto: Collins. ISBN 9780002622523.

Government offices
Preceded by Vincent Massey	Governor General of Canada; 1959–1967	Succeeded by Roland Michener
Diplomatic posts
Preceded by New title	Canadian Ambassador Extraordinary and Plenipotentiary to France; 1944–1953	Succeeded by Jean Désy
Preceded by New title	Canadian Representative to the Government of France in exile 1942–1944	Succeeded by Title abolished
Preceded by New title	Canadian Envoy Extraordinary and Minister Plenipotentiary to the Governments of Belgium, Czechoslovakia, Greece, the Netherlands, Norway, Poland, and Yugoslavia in exile 1942–1944	Succeeded by Title abolished
Preceded by Philippe Roy	Canadian Envoy Extraordinary and Minister Plenipotentiary to France; 1938–1940	Succeeded by Title abolished
