= Citadelle of Quebec =

Building in Quebec, Canada

- La Citadelle de Québec (French)
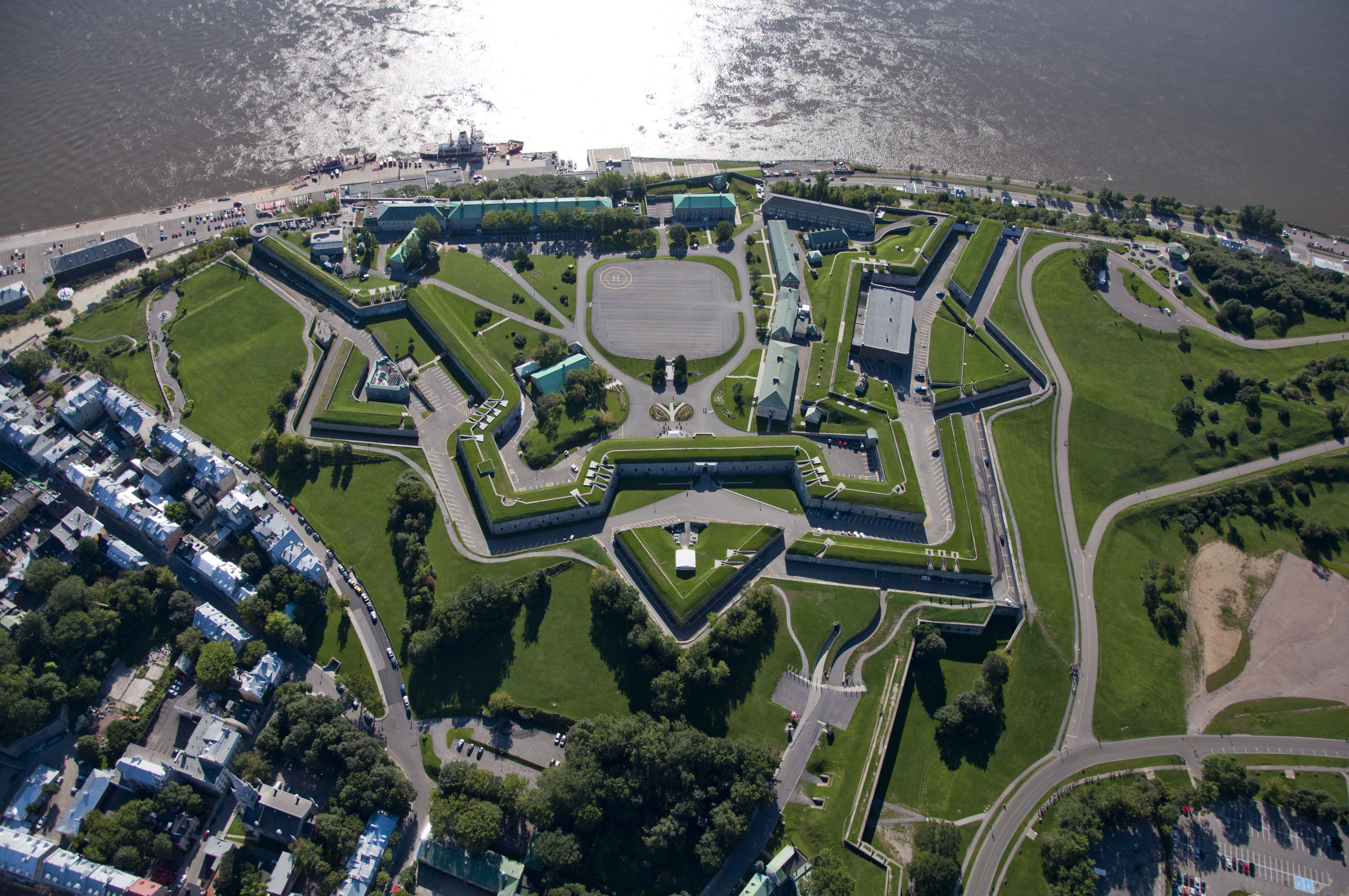

General information
- Location: Quebec City, Quebec, Canada
- Coordinates: 46.8074°N 71.2071°W
- Construction started: 1820 to 1850
- Cost: 200 000 sterling pounds, 60 000 estimated in 1816
- Client: The Crown of France (1693, 1701, 1745, 1750); The Crown of Great Britain and Ireland (1820, 1831, 1842); The Crown of Canada (1872)
- Owner: The King in Right of Canada (Charles III)

Design and construction
- Architect: Various
- Engineer: 9

National Historic Site of Canada
- Official name: Québec Citadel National Historic Site of Canada
- Designated: 15 May 1946

The Citadelle of Quebec (French: Citadelle de Québec), also known as La Citadelle, is an active military installation and the secondary official residence of the governor general of Canada. It is atop Cap Diamant, adjoining the Plains of Abraham in Quebec City, Quebec. The citadel forms part of the fortifications of Quebec City, which is one of only two cities in North America still surrounded by fortifications, the other being Campeche, Mexico. It is also an official residence of the monarch of Canada, when they are in Quebec.

The strategic importance of Cap Diamant was recognized by the French as early as 1608. Several defensive fortifications were built on the site first by the French and then by the British after their conquest of New France. The modern citadel was built from 1820 to 1850, in an effort to secure Quebec City against a potential American attack. The British used the citadel until 1871, when they formally handed the property over to the Canadian government. Following the handover, the citadel was used as a military installation by the Canadian Armed Forces and as a royal and vice-regal residence.

The Citadelle is a National Historic Site of Canada and forms part of the Fortifications of Quebec National Historic Site of Canada. The fortress is located within the Historic District of Old Quebec, which was designated a World Heritage Site in 1985. The site receives some 200,000 visitors annually.

== History ==
Cap Diamant's strategic value was identified by Samuel de Champlain in 1608 and led him to found Quebec City at the base of the escarpment. The promontory was practically insurmountable and thus the only side of the settlement ever to be heavily fortified was the west, the only one not naturally protected by the hill.

=== Early fortifications ===
==== French rule ====
The first protective wall (enceinte)—Major Provost's palisade—was built by command of Governor General of New France Louis de Buade, sieur de Frontenac and completed just in time for the Battle of Quebec in 1690. Three years later, a plan by engineer Josué Boisberthelot de Beaucours for new, 75-metre (246 ft) wide enceinte was developed by the French military engineer Jacques Levasseur de Néré and approved in 1701 by King Louis XIV's Commissary General of Fortifications, Sébastien Le Prestre de Vauban.

The proposal to build a full fort was deemed by the government in France to be too costly, despite both the importance and vulnerability of Quebec City. After the fall of Louisbourg in 1745, considerable work on the battlements took place under the direction of military engineer Gaspard-Joseph Chaussegros de Léry.

==== British rule ====
The first British lieutenant governor of Quebec, General James Murray, saw the weakness of Quebec City's defences (indeed, Murray's post existed precisely because the British had conquered Quebec City four years before Murray's appointment as governor in 1763). He urged the construction of a citadel, but the imperial government at Westminster, like the French before, deemed a large fort to be of little value; a smaller, wooden citadel was built.

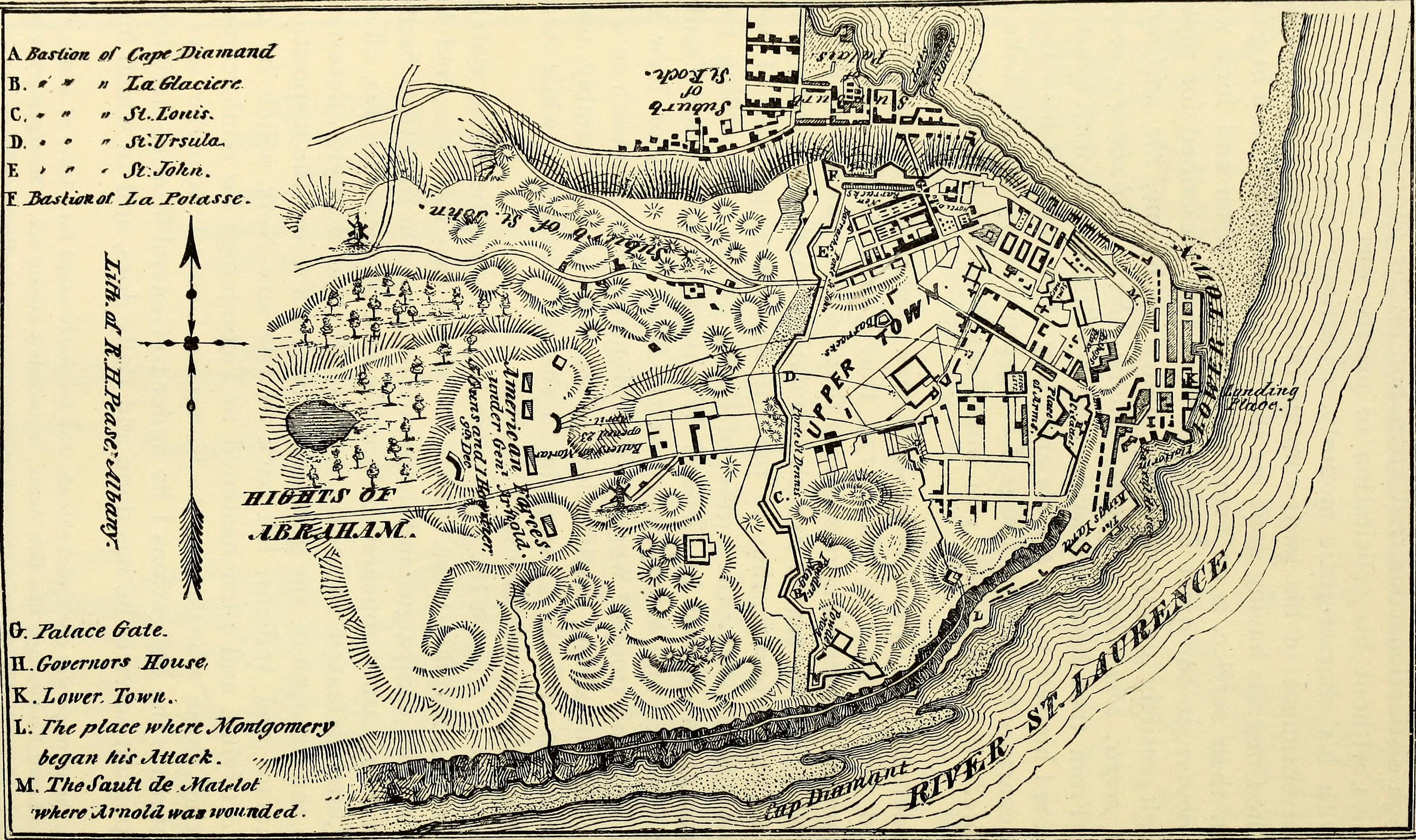
A map of the Quebec during an American siege of city in 1775. The site of the modern citadel (labelled Bastion of Cape Diamond) was only fortified by the ramparts of Quebec City at the time.

During the American Revolutionary War, after seizing Montreal in the autumn of 1775, American rebels, led by General Richard Montgomery and Benedict Arnold, attempted to take Quebec on 31 December. There, Montgomery was killed and Arnold wounded and forced to retreat. The Americans attempted to keep Quebec under siege, but withdrew after the arrival of British reinforcements in the spring of 1776.

=== Present fortification ===
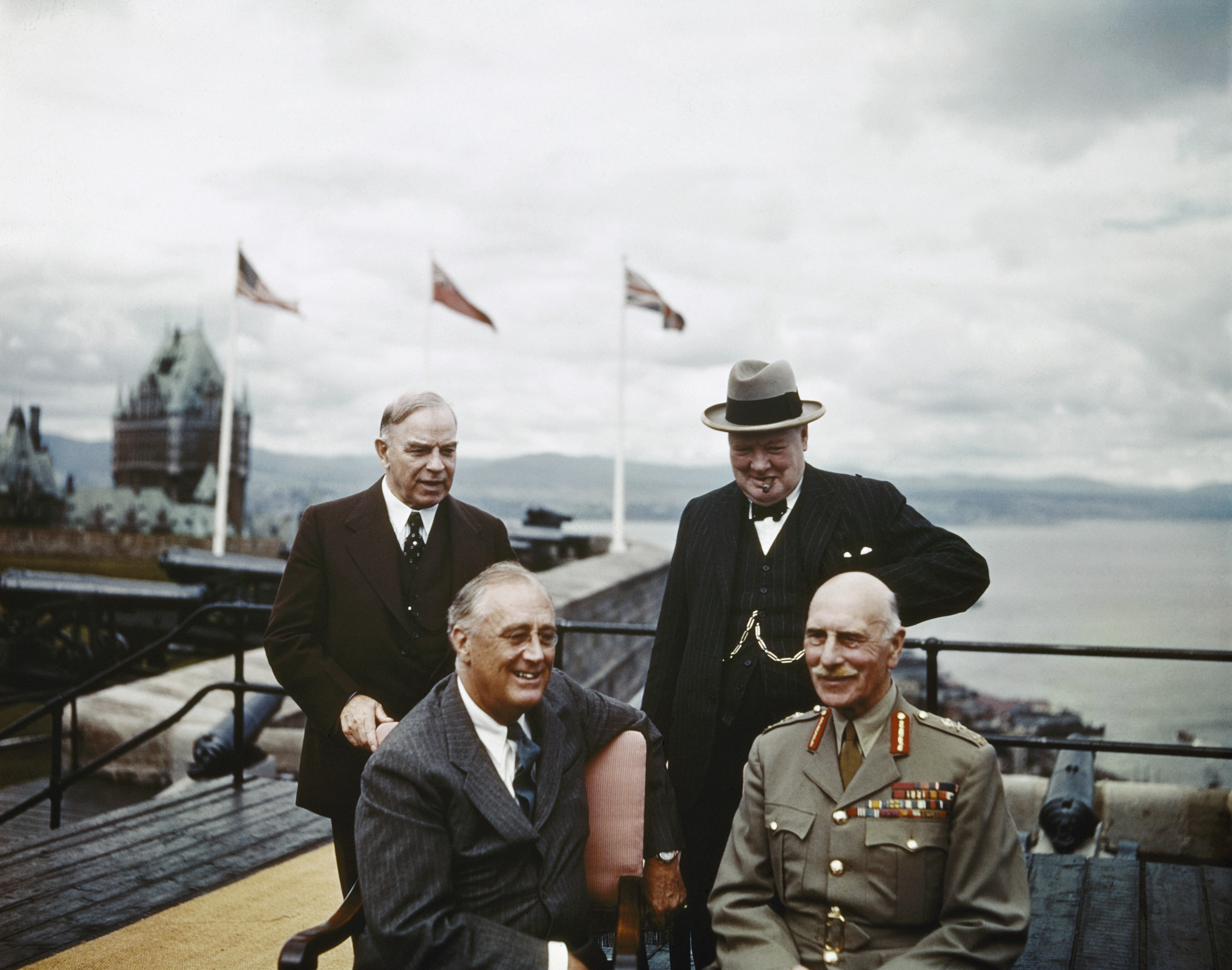
The 1943 Quebec Conference was a secret military conference between the American, British, and Canadian governments held at La Citadelle.

As tensions between the United Kingdom and the United States, as well as fears of further rebellion in British North America, grew in the late 18th century, the British reinforced the defences of their colonies according to a plan drawn up in the 1790s by Gother Mann. The ramparts around the Upper Town cliff and four martello towers (still extant) on the Plains of Abraham were completed before 1812. A citadel was a key part of Mann's design, but no fort was built because the cost was deemed prohibitive.

That opinion finally shifted following the War of 1812; as part of a wider improvement of Canada's defences coordinated by the Duke of Richmond, then Governor-in-Chief of British North America, the existing star fort was built between 1820 and 1850 under the direction of Lieutenant-Colonel Elias Walker Durnford of the Royal Engineers. Intended to secure Quebec City against the Americans and serve as a refuge for the British garrison in the event of attack or rebellion, the Citadelle incorporated a section of the French enceinte of 1745 and the layout was based on Sébastien Le Prestre de Vauban's design for an arms, munitions, and supplies depot, as well as a barracks. That, though, was somewhat of an anachronism by the time of the fort's completion, in comparison to other contemporary European military architecture. Additional buildings were completed in 1850.

After Canadian Confederation in 1867, Canada became responsible for its own defence; the British departed the Citadelle in 1871. Two batteries of the Royal Canadian Artillery were established at the Citadelle and an artillery school was opened in 1871, followed by a cavalry school. From the late 19th century, living conditions for soldiers at the fort gradually improved; canteens were opened and the casemates were made more comfortable. The preservation of much of the fortifications and defences of Quebec is due to the intervention of Governor General of Canada the Marquess of Dufferin and Ava, who also established the Citadelle as a viceregal residence in 1872, reviving a tradition dating to the founding of New France. Since 1920, the Citadelle has been the home station of the Royal 22^{e} Régiment of the Canadian Forces.

The Quebec Conferences of 1943 and 1944, in which Governor General of Canada the Earl of Athlone, Prime Minister of Canada William Lyon Mackenzie King, British Prime Minister Winston Churchill, and US President Franklin D. Roosevelt discussed strategy for World War II, were held at the Citadelle of Quebec.

The Historic Sites and Monuments Board of Canada designated the Citadel as a national historic site in 1946. The fortress was designated as a National Historic Site of Canada in 1980 and, five years later, the Historic District of Old Québec, of which the Citadelle is a part, was placed on UNESCO's list of World Heritage Sites.

== Function ==
The Royal 22^{e} Régiment at La Citadelle's parade grounds

The Citadelle is a functioning military installation for the Canadian Armed Forces, as well as an official residence of both Canada's monarch and its governor general. The latter, by tradition, resides there for several weeks during the summer as well as other shorter periods throughout the year. As is done at the other federal royal residence, Rideau Hall in Ottawa, Canadian award presentations and investitures and ceremonies for both incoming and outgoing ambassadors and high commissioners to Canada are held at the Citadelle. The residence is also open to the public, running a visitors' program and free tours of the state rooms throughout the year as well as educational tours for students. The Citadelle attracts approximately 200,000 visitors each year.

Building 1 of the Citadelle is used as the staff headquarters for the Royal 22^{e} Régiment. Several military ceremonies related to the regiment also take place at the Citadelle's parade ground, such as the changing of the guard and of battalion command and the consecration of each successive Batisse the Goat as regimental mascot.

A cannon is fired from the fort daily at noon as a time signal. It can be heard throughout Quebec City. Originally, two guns were fired each day, at noon to alert Quebec City residents of the lunch hour and the Angelus or noon-day prayer, and at 9:30 pm, marking the curfew for soldiers in the city. The tradition has continued since 1871, save for between 1994 and 2008.

== Buildings ==
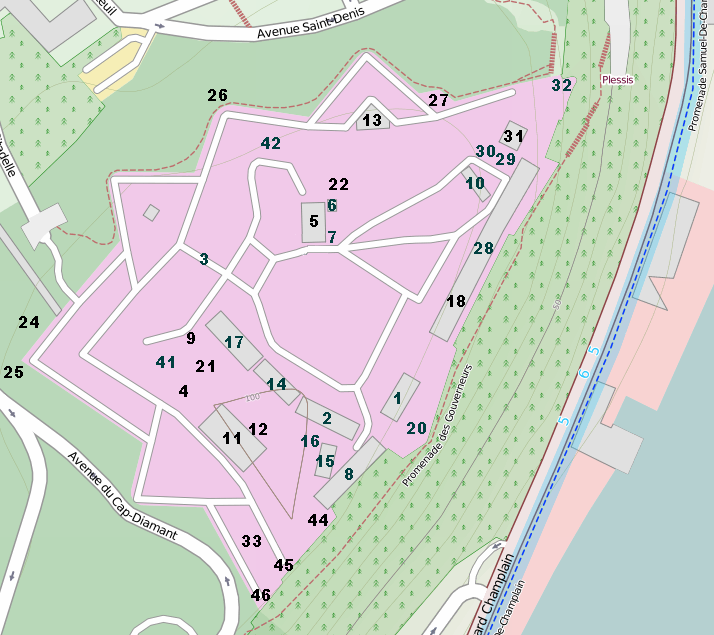
Map of the citadel with building numbers

The fort is an uneven star shaped citadel and comprises four bastions and three straight curtain walls, all constructed with locally quarried sandstone. Within its walls are 24 buildings constructed mostly of grey cut stone.

=== Royal and viceregal residence ===
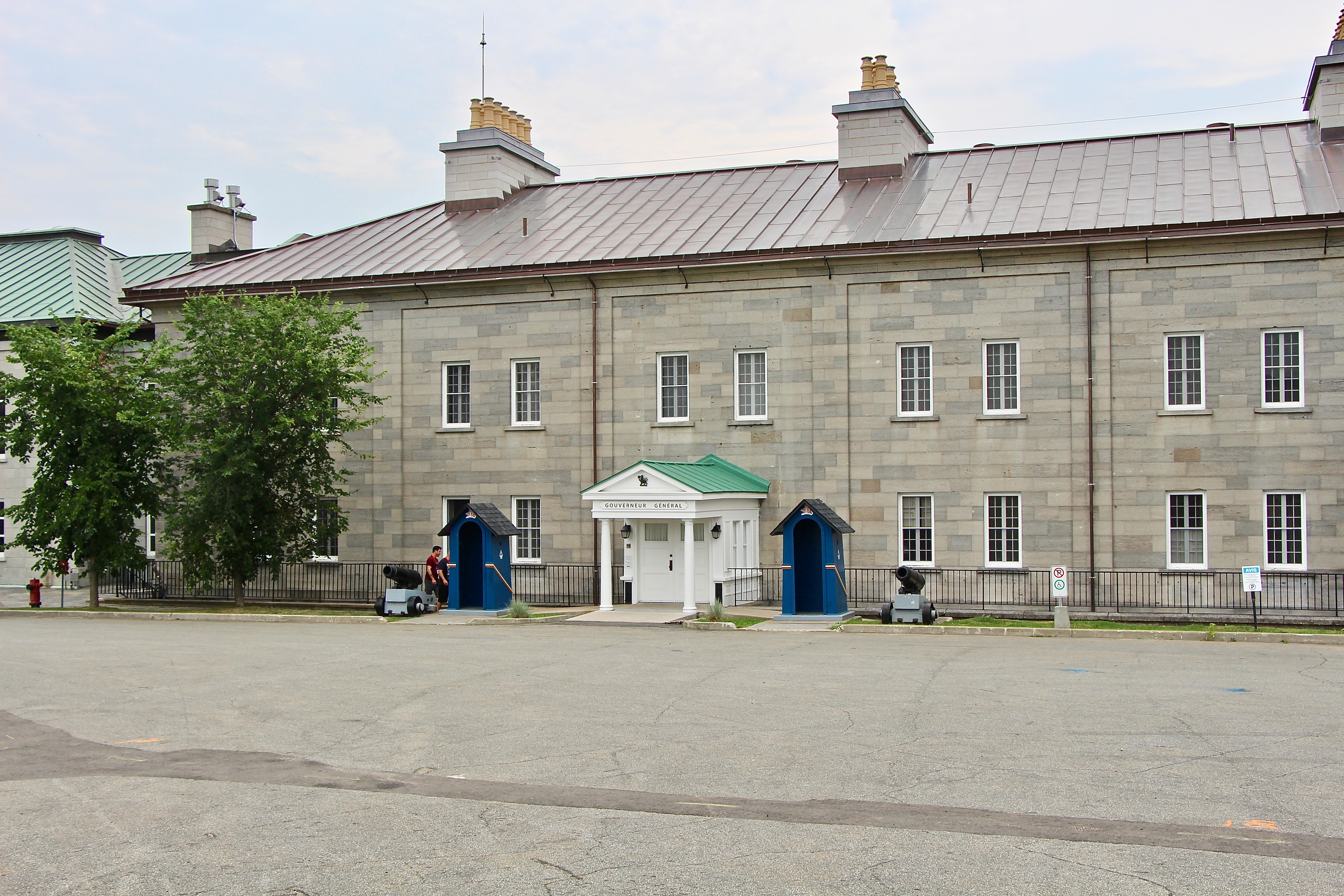
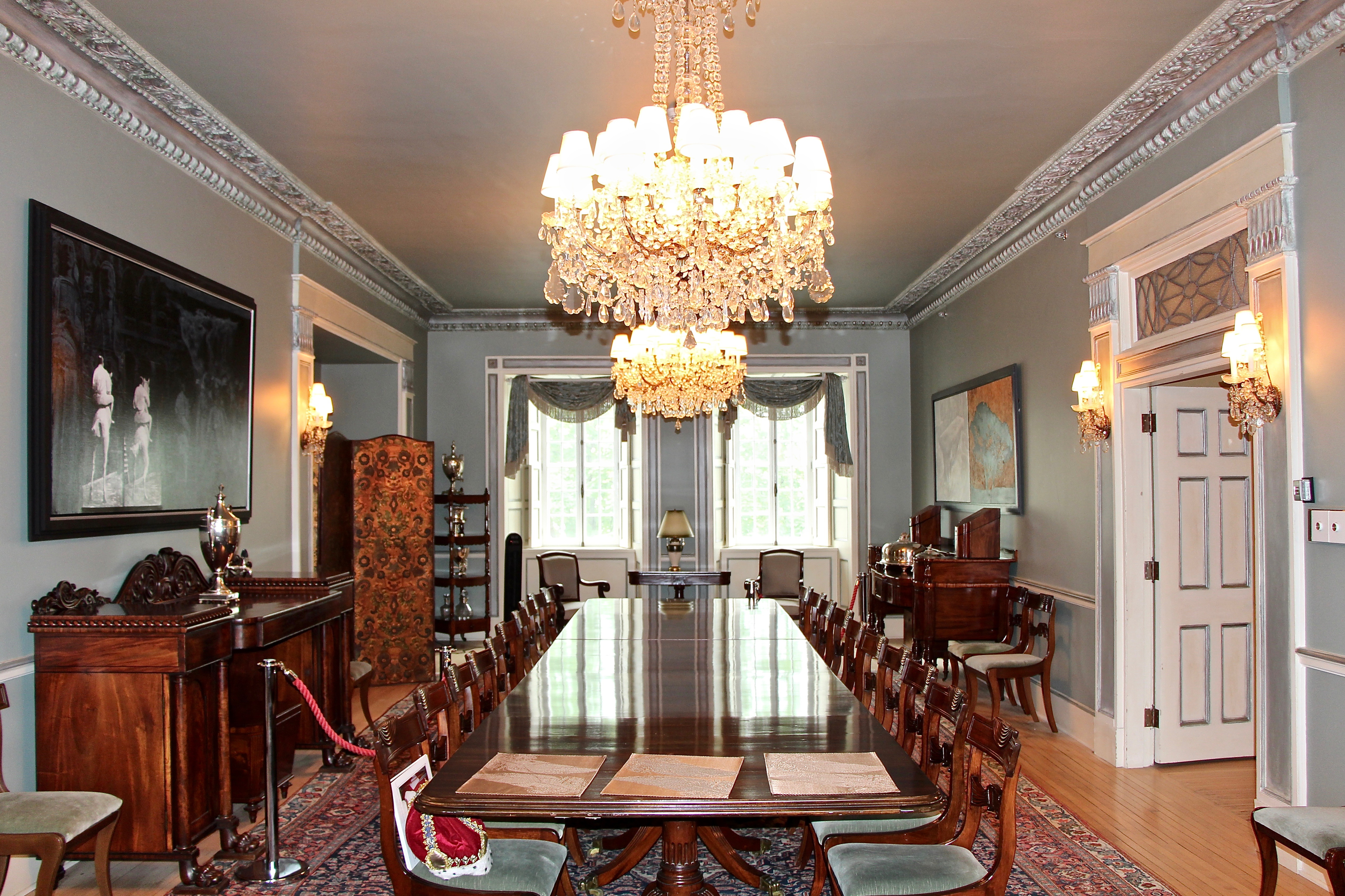
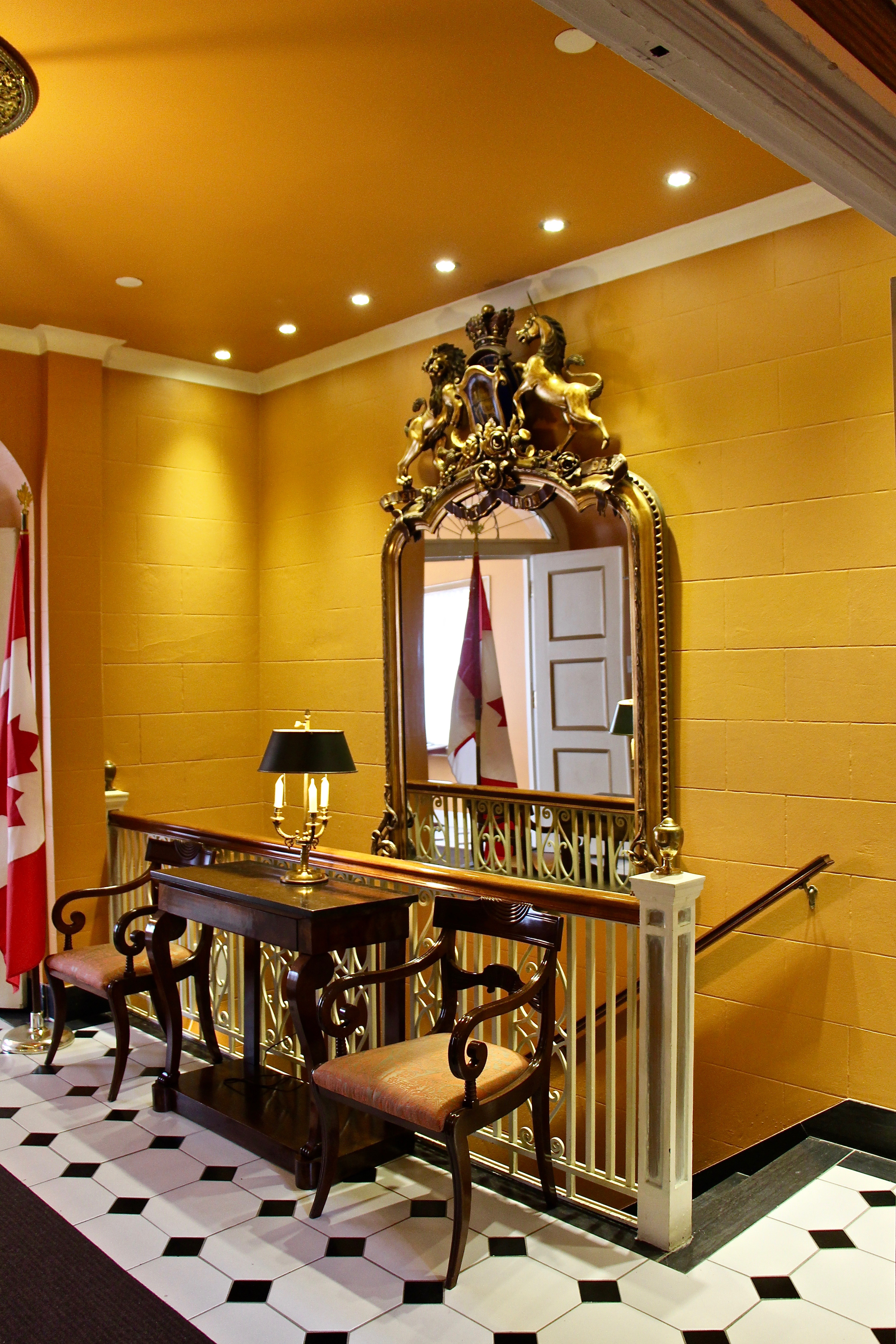
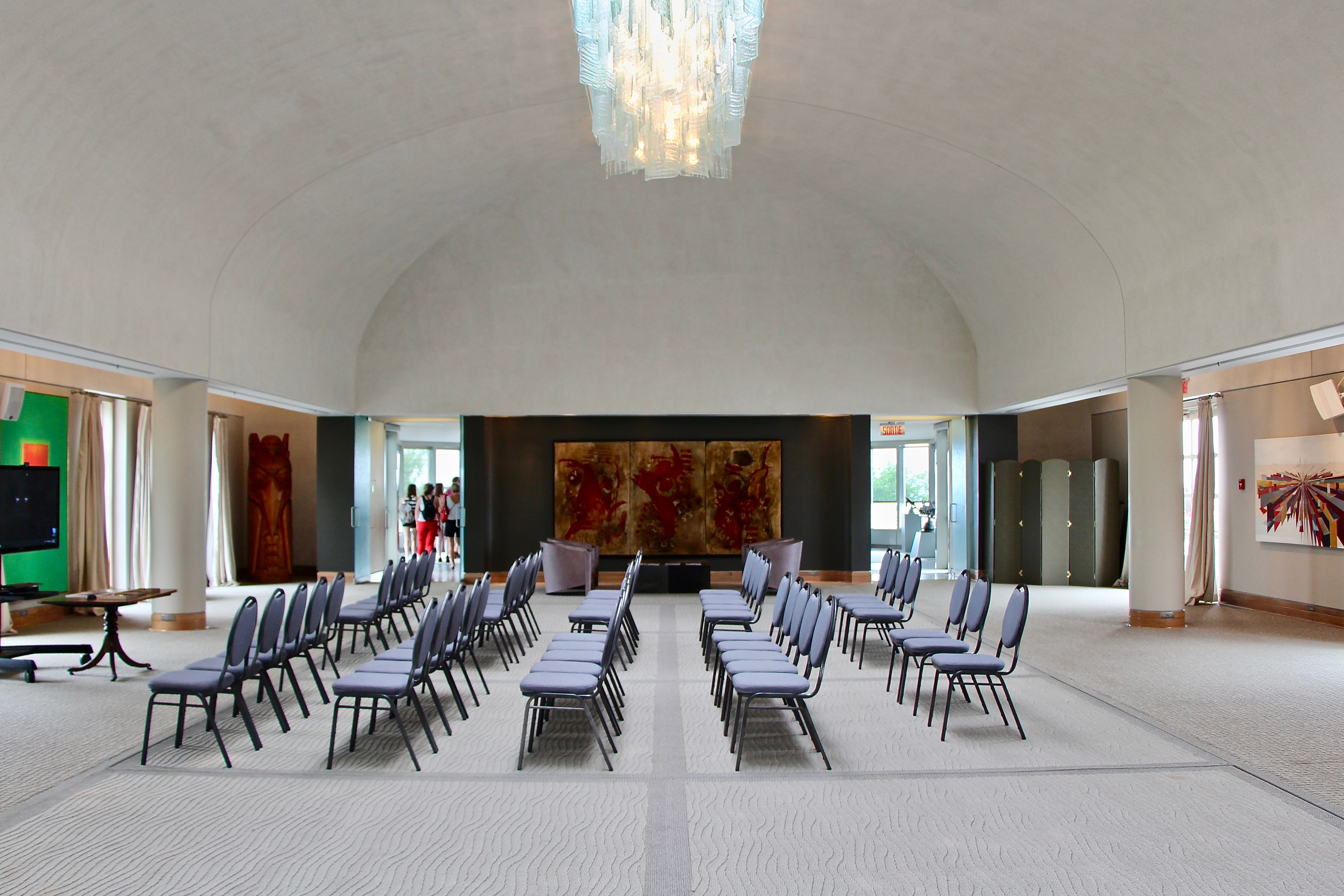
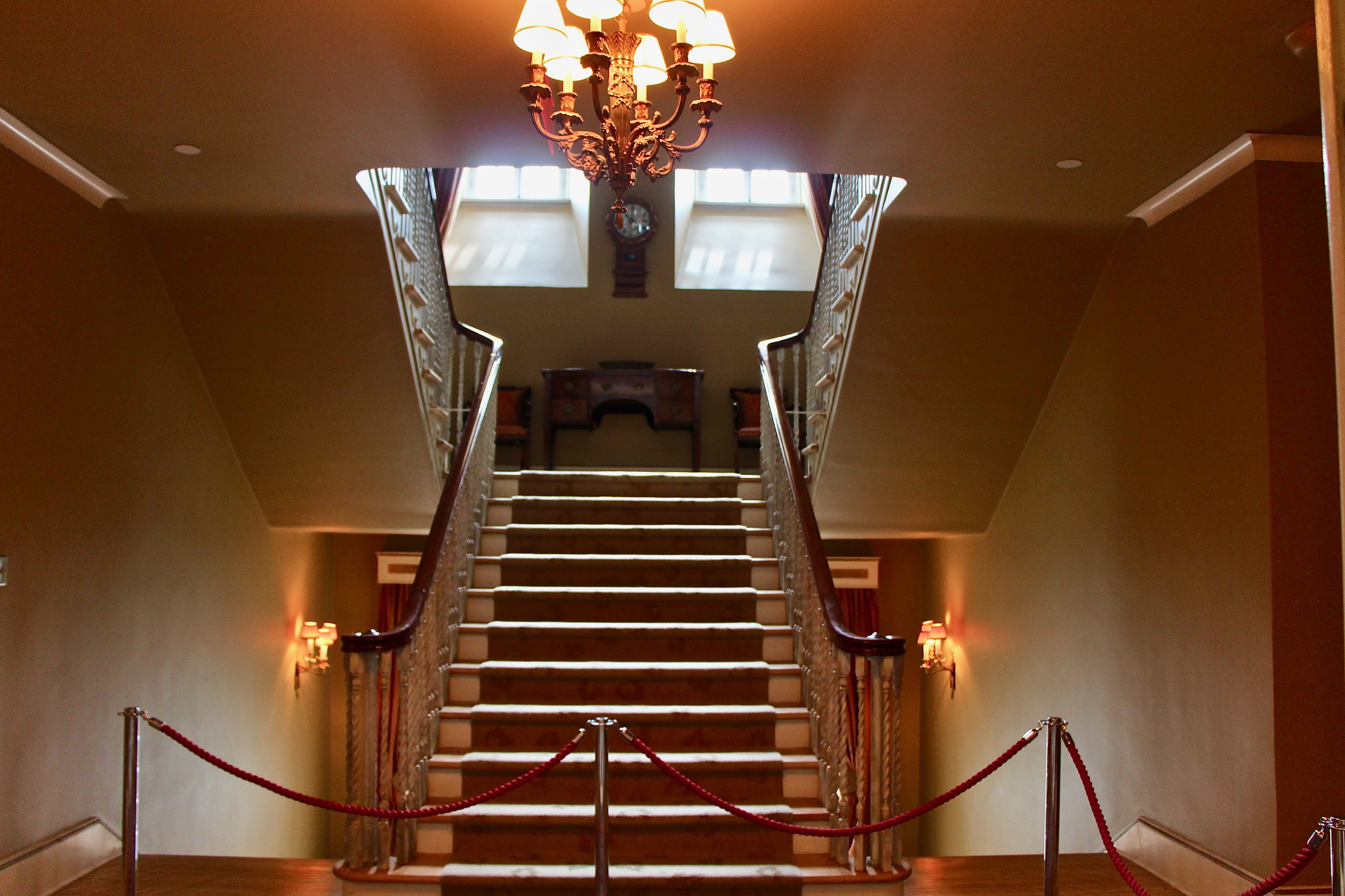
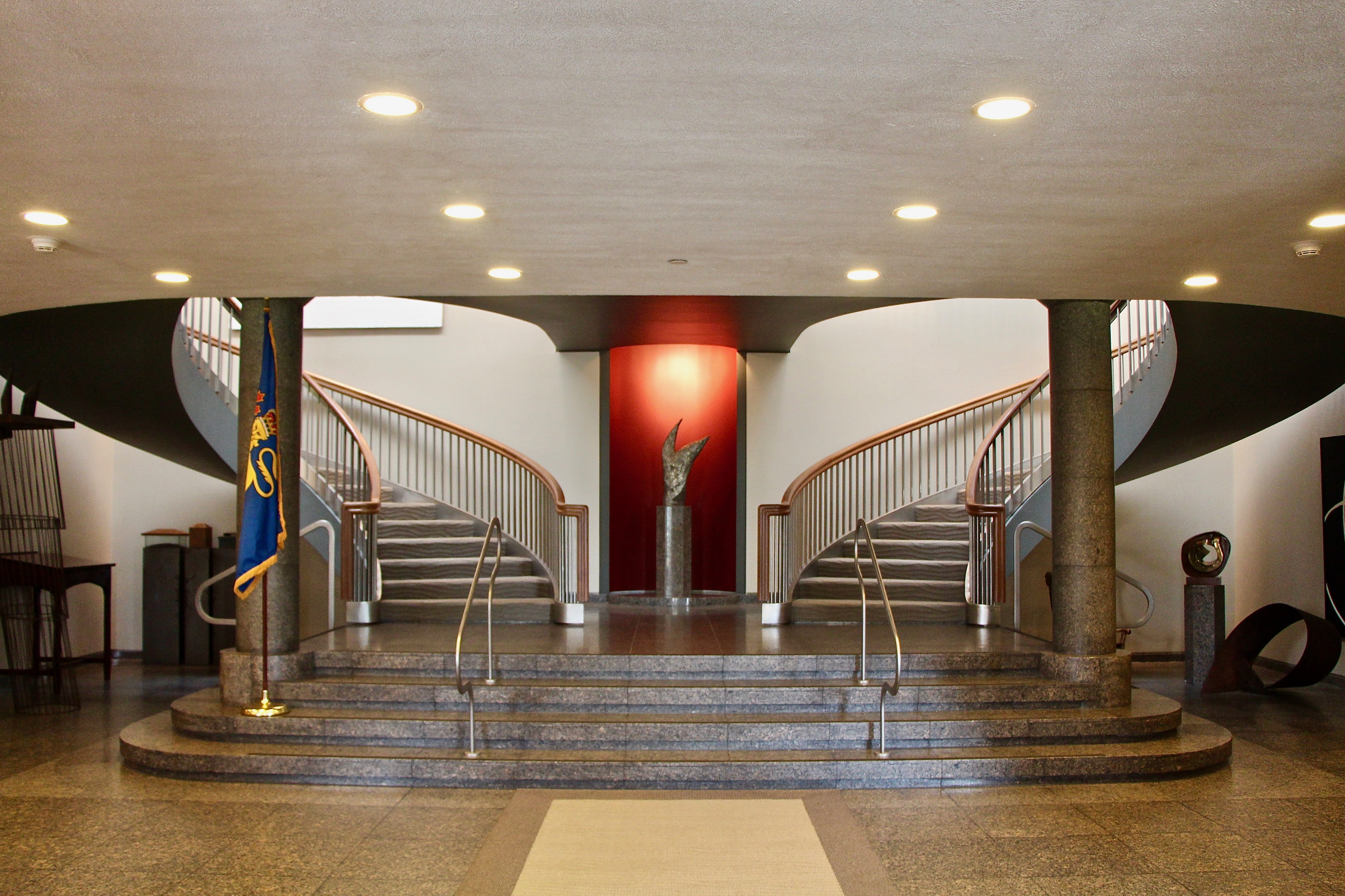
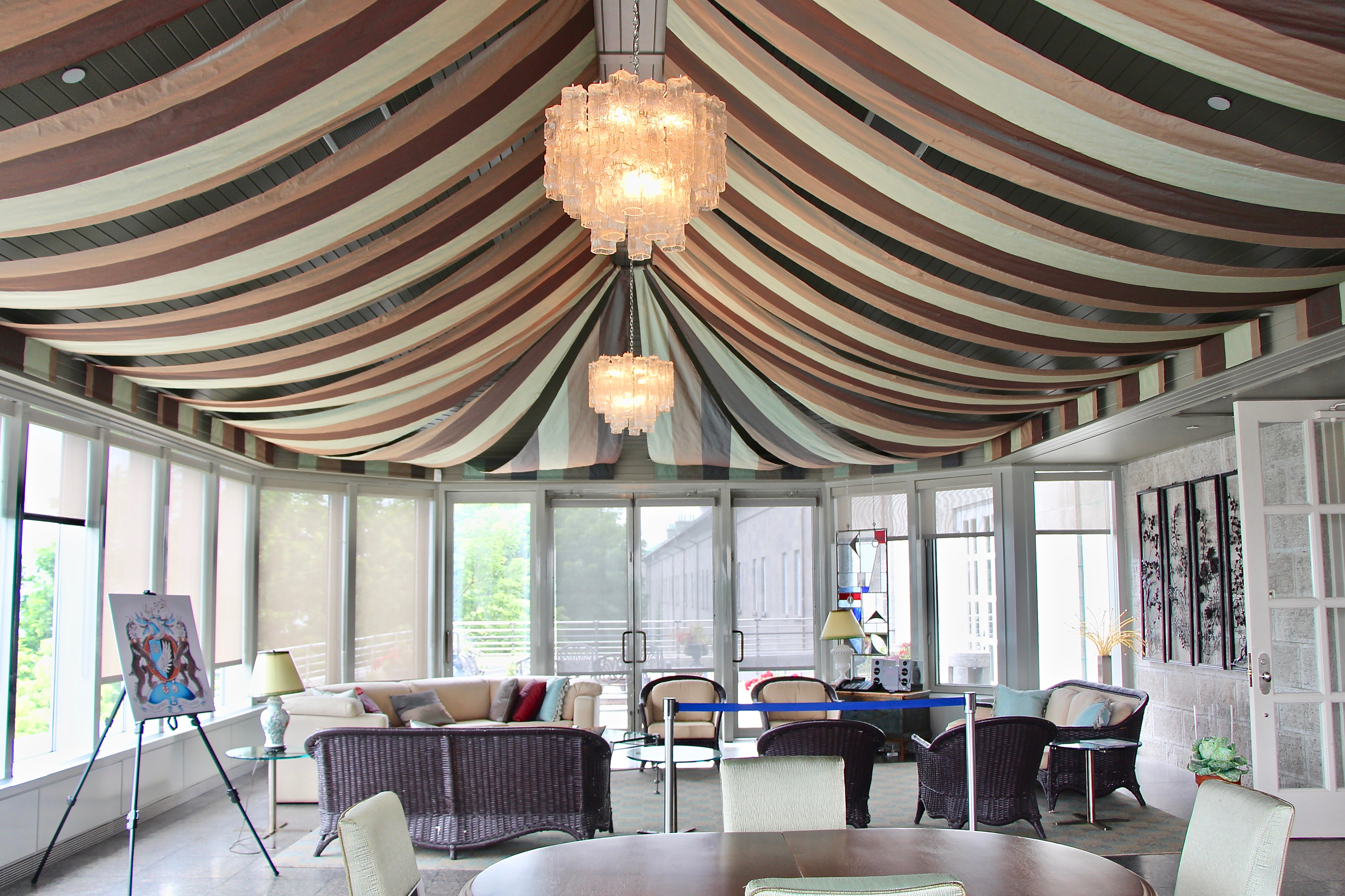
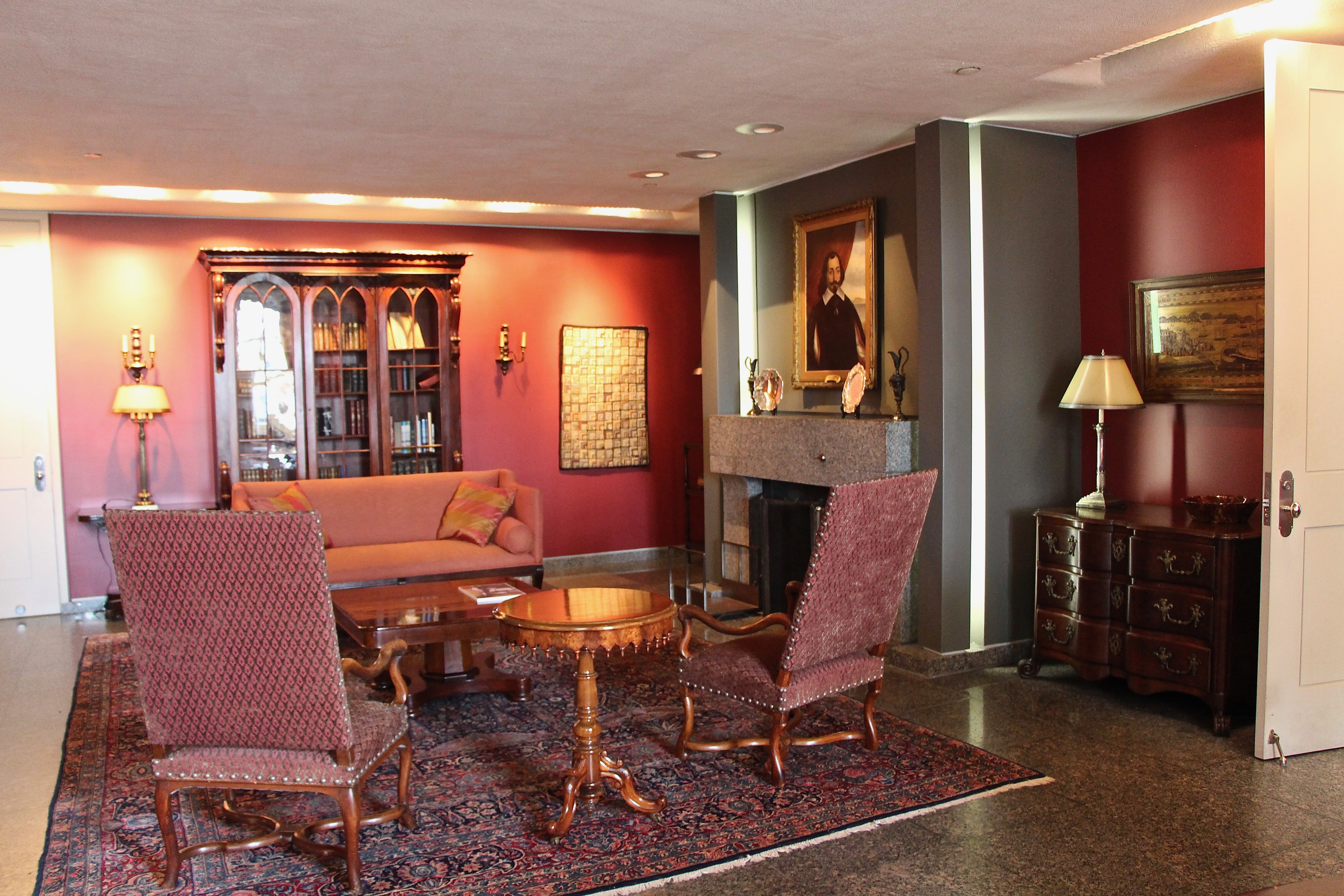
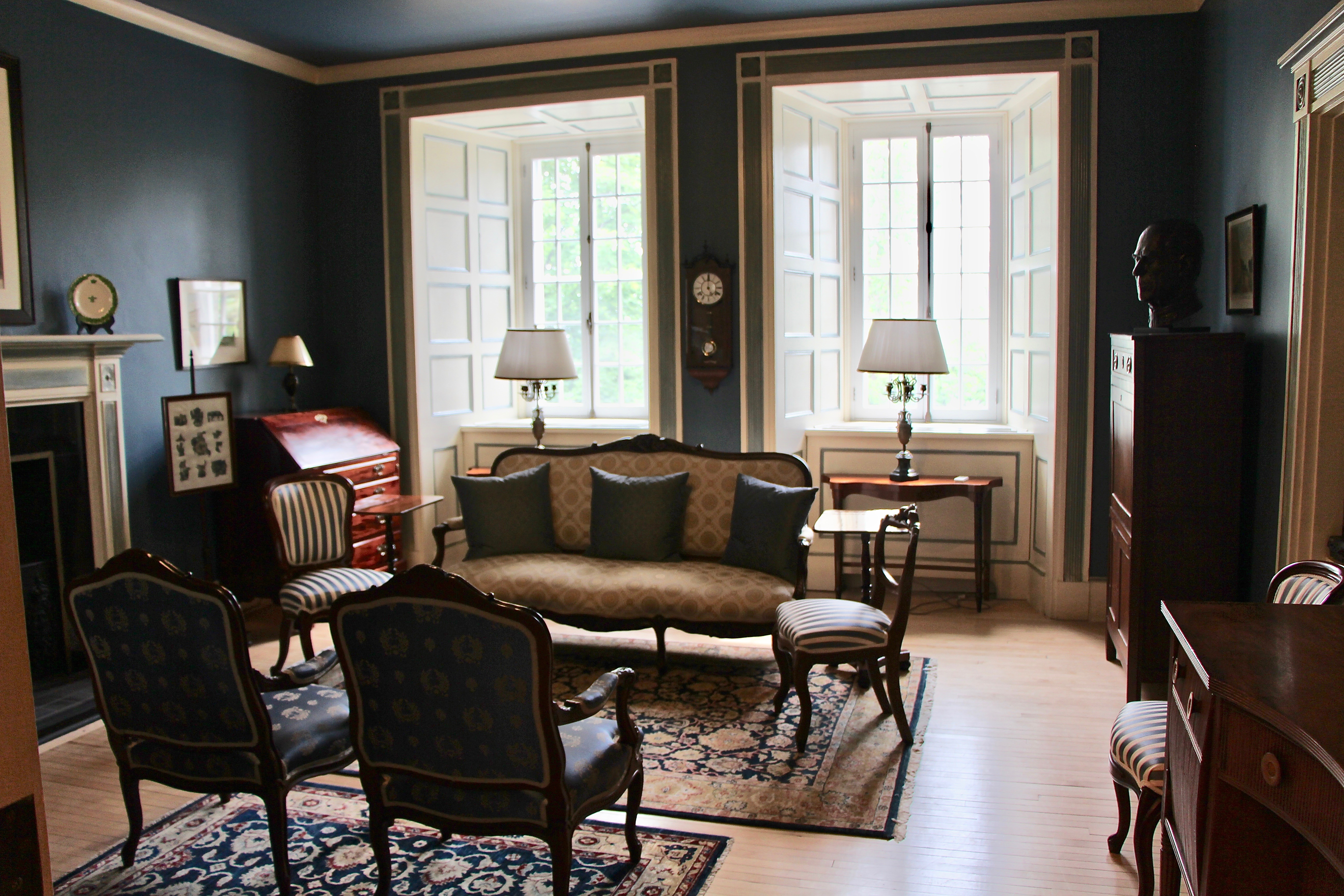
(Clockwise from top) the official residence for the Canadian monarch and the governor general; stair to basement level from the original foyer; grand salon in the 1984 addition; twin spiral staircases in the new entrance hall; solarium; a sitting room in the 1831 wing; a sitting room in the 1984 wing; original main staircase; dining room in the 1831 wing

The Officer's Barracks, a neo-Norman structure built in 1831 by the British Army, has been a residence of the governor general of Canada since 1872. The residence today has a total of 153 rooms over 4,459 square metres (48,000 sq ft), including offices for the governor general's secretary.

The entrance into the original area of the residence is through a set of double doors beneath a neo-classical porch bearing the words Gouverneur Général on the frieze and the crest of the royal arms of Canada in the tympanum. Within is a foyer with marble tile floor, a stair descending to the basement, and, through another set of doors in a screen with translucent leaded glass sidelights and fanlight, is a hall; both rooms are in the Georgian style, in beige, cream, and gold. The Small Dining Room is similarly Georgian in decor, with robin's egg blue walls and white-painted trim. From the ceiling hang two crystal chandeliers.

Soon after the building became a royal residence, additions to accommodate the viceregal party and household were required, including a ballroom and sunroom. These, however, were, on 2 February 1976, destroyed by fire and the other rooms of the residence suffered smoke and water damage. The Department of Public Works and Government Services Canada (which oversees the infrastructure of the Citadelle) restored the original wing and new state rooms were built in place of the lost post-1872 additions, the work being completed in 1984.

This new wing was built at the east end of and at a slight angle to the 1831 structure, the roof being copper and the exterior walls of the same masonry as the adjacent buildings, but, using more regulated block sizes and a flatter relief of pilasters and windows, as well as less detailing overall. The wing contains a separate entrance and ceremonial foyer with twin spiral staircases ascending to a piano nobile; the stairs have wood handrails with aluminum pickets and between, the flights, is a niche for sculpture. On the upper level are an event space, lounge, and sunroom with a terrace overlooking the St. Lawrence River. The former two areas are fully barrel vaulted and linked together by a continuous, narrow skylight, under which crystal pendants of different lengths hang and transfer the natural light into the rooms. Interiors of the modern addition were designed by Quebec artist Madeleine Arbour, who was inspired by the colours of winter in Quebec, and use Canadian materials, including granite, walnut, and aluminum. The residence is furnished with pieces from the Crown Collection, mostly in New France style, antique furniture mixed with contemporary Canadian art.

=== Royal 22^{e} Régiment Museum ===
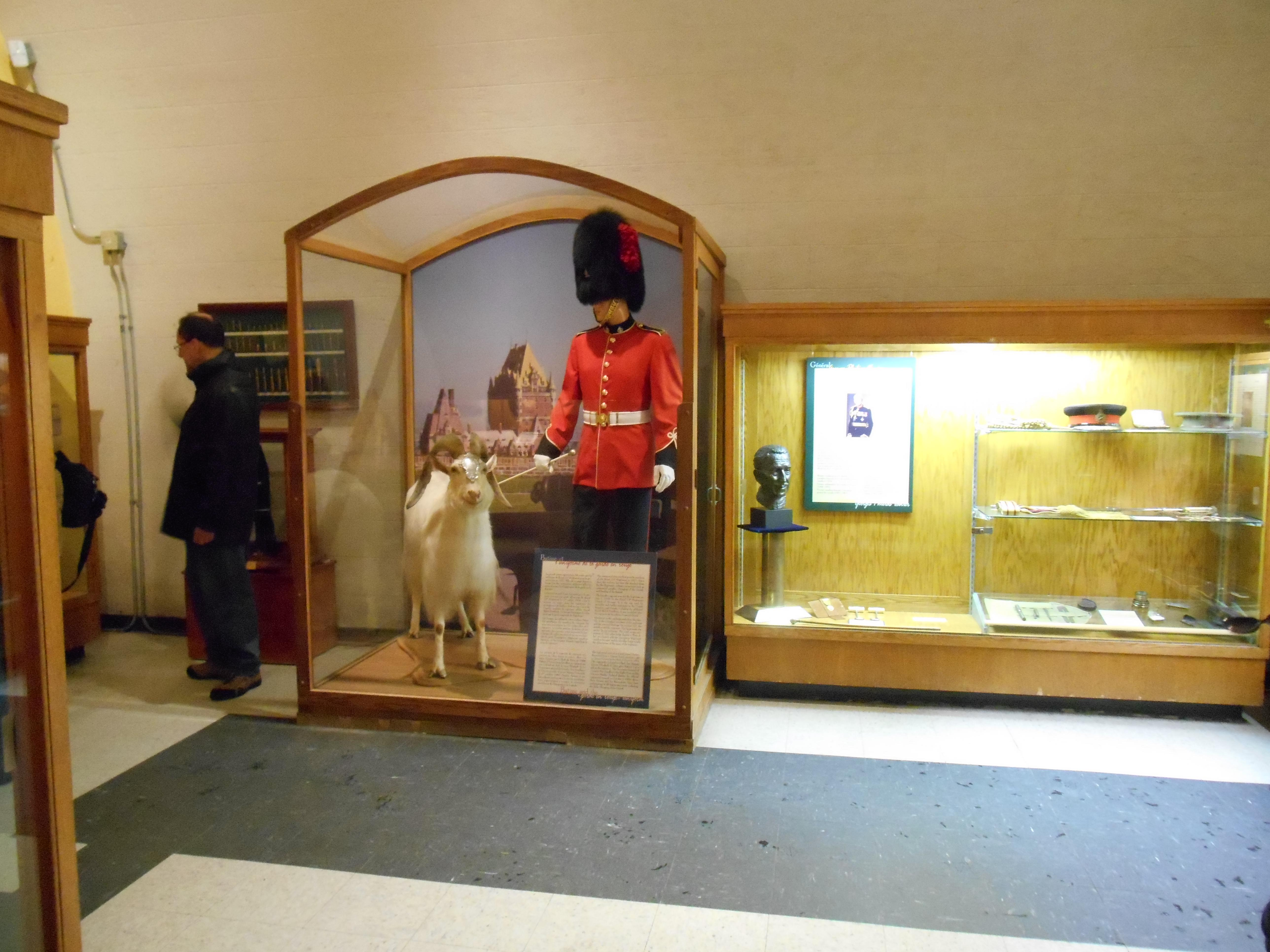
The Museum of the Royal 22^{e} Régiment is at La Citadelle. It features items of historical significance to the Canadian military.

Building 15, constructed in 1750, also known as the powder magazine, houses the Museum of the Royal 22^{e} Régiment and Canadian Forces Museum, which collects, preserves, and displays artifacts of Canadian military historical significance, as well as the museum, which features weapons, uniforms, and other military artifacts of the Royal 22^{e} Régiment. The museum is affiliated with: Canadian Museums Association, Canadian Heritage Information Network, Organization of Military Museums of Canada and Virtual Museum of Canada.

=== Other buildings ===
Building 1, the Former Hospital Administration Building, is the principal structure in Mann's Bastion. It is a two-storey, rectangular, symmetrical stone structure with a hipped-roof pierced by two brick chimneys. The west-facing façade features restrained decorative detailing of pilasters supporting a flat cornice along the length of the five-bay façade. Loopholes are visible on the second floor on both sides of the building. The rear elevation facing into the bastion is functional and plain in appearance.

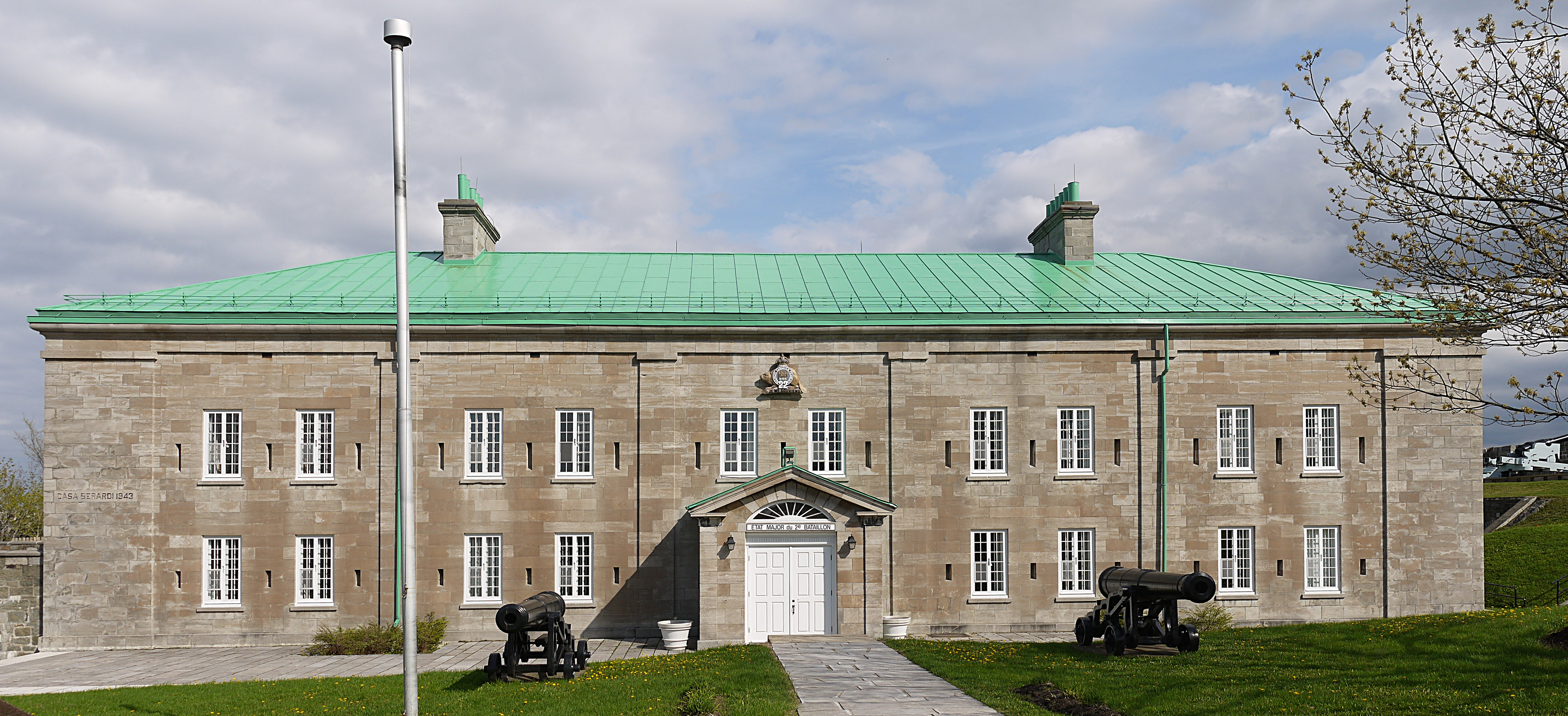
Building 1 is the principal structure of Mann's Bastion

Building 2, also known as the Men's Barracks, was formerly the armoury and powder magazine. It faces the parade ground near the throat of the Prince of Wales Bastion. It is a long, rectangular, two-storey masonry building built of smooth limestone with a hipped roof clad in sheet copper. The main façade of the building has little ornamentation and is regulated and orderly, with small, regularly placed, multi-paned windows.

Building 5, the Former Powder Magazine, is a low, rectangular stone structure with a gabled roof and a surrounding protective blast wall. Two doors at ground level and three openings at gable level pierce the symmetrical façade. Along the plain side elevations are three half-barrel-vaulted passages, or traverses, two on the west and one on the east.

Building 7, also known as the Memorial Building, forms part of a complex of three structures, which includes a chapel and a workshop, situated near the parade ground. They are attached by a 19th-century protective wall. It is a small, rectangular, one-storey masonry edifice with a pyramidal stone roof and a row of windows on all four elevations. Its principal façade is distinguished by a modern porchway. Governor General Georges Vanier and his wife Pauline Vanier are interred here at the commemorative chapel.

Located within the King's Bastion and adjacent to the governor general's residence, Building 10 is the former military prison and presently the museum annex. Constructed in 1842, it is a two-storey rectangular stone structure with a hipped roof pierced by three brick chimneys. The west elevation facing the citadel is restrained but decorated by pilasters. Loopholes pierce the walls on both storeys. There are several irregularly placed windows with iron bars.

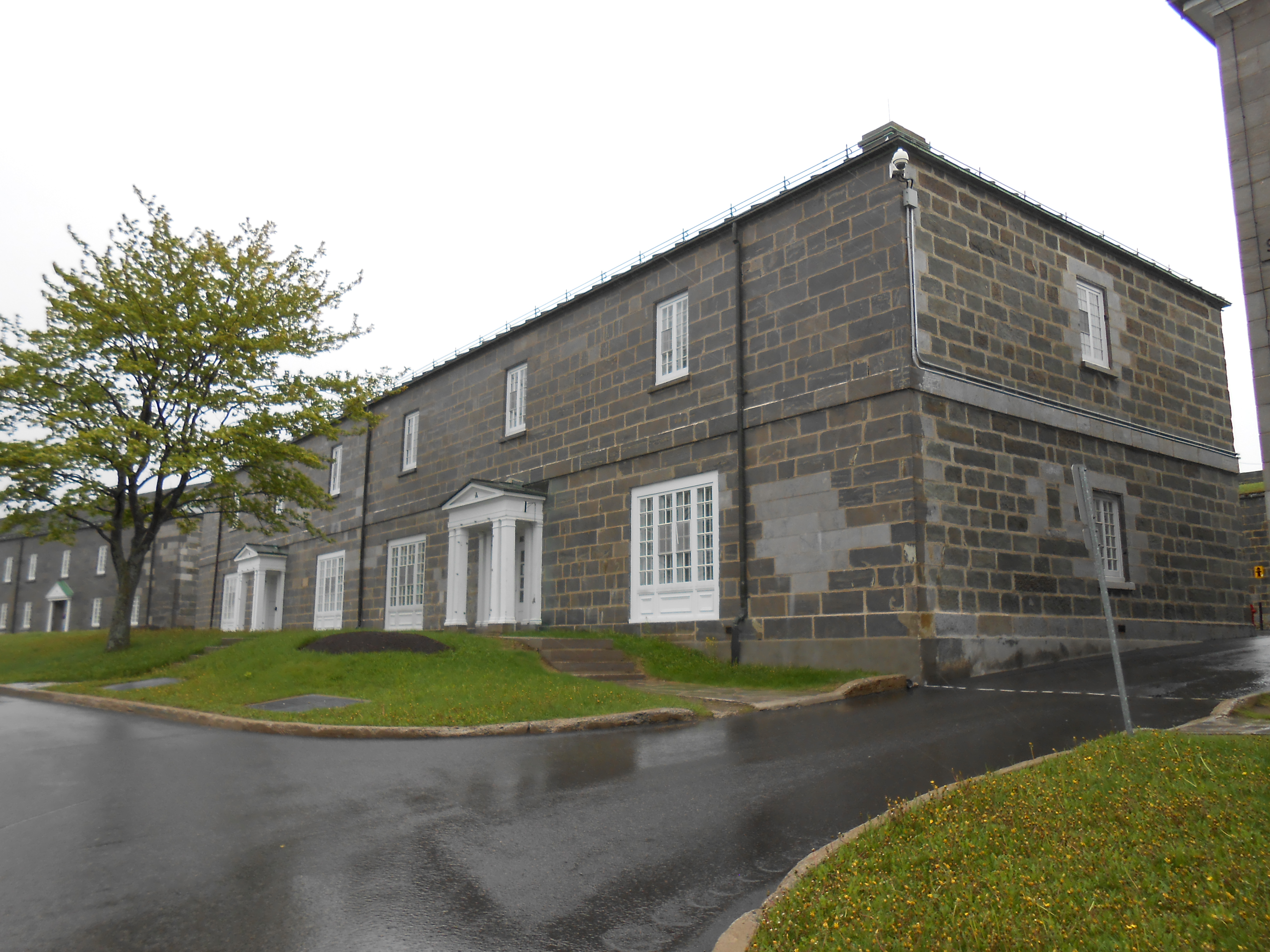
Building 14 is southwest of the citadel's parade ground

Building 14, the former ordnance store, stands along the parade ground. The long, rectangular two-storey structure is constructed of stone with a hipped roof clad in copper sheet. The symmetrical façade features small, evenly spaced windows.

Building 16 is the museum office and former cooperage.

Building 17, also known as the Men's Barracks, stands on the south side of the parade ground near the throat of the Dalhousie Bastion. Two storeys high for most of its length, the rectangular building has exterior walls of stone and features symmetrical elevations, a hipped, copper-clad roof, and a projecting course of stone above the ground floor.

Clearly seen from the river and aligned on the meridian for observation purposes, Building 20, also known as the Ball House, is the former observatory and time ball tower. It is a compact, tall, two-storey stone structure of several architectural shapes. The rectangular section with a gabled roof was the former observatory, and the square section formerly housed the time ball installation topped with an antenna. The building is entered from the ground floor of its small porch, which joins the two buildings.

Building 32, formerly the Defensive Guard House, is at the eastern end of the north main ditch below the King's Bastion. It is a small, squat, one-storey masonry edifice with a gable roof supported by wood rafters. A chimney rises through the roof, which is covered in painted tin sheeting.

The former caponier, Building 46, is at the south end of the ditch separating the counterscarp from the Men's Barracks. Its two walls and small turret in the middle of its gabled roof are the only visible elements of this small stone building. It is integrated with the ramparts and pierced with loopholes.

== See also ==
- Government Houses in Canada
- Government Houses of the British Empire and Commonwealth
- List of forts
- Ramparts of Quebec City
