= Place Vanier =

Office building complex in Ottawa, Canada

Coordinates: 45°25′52″N 75°40′7″W

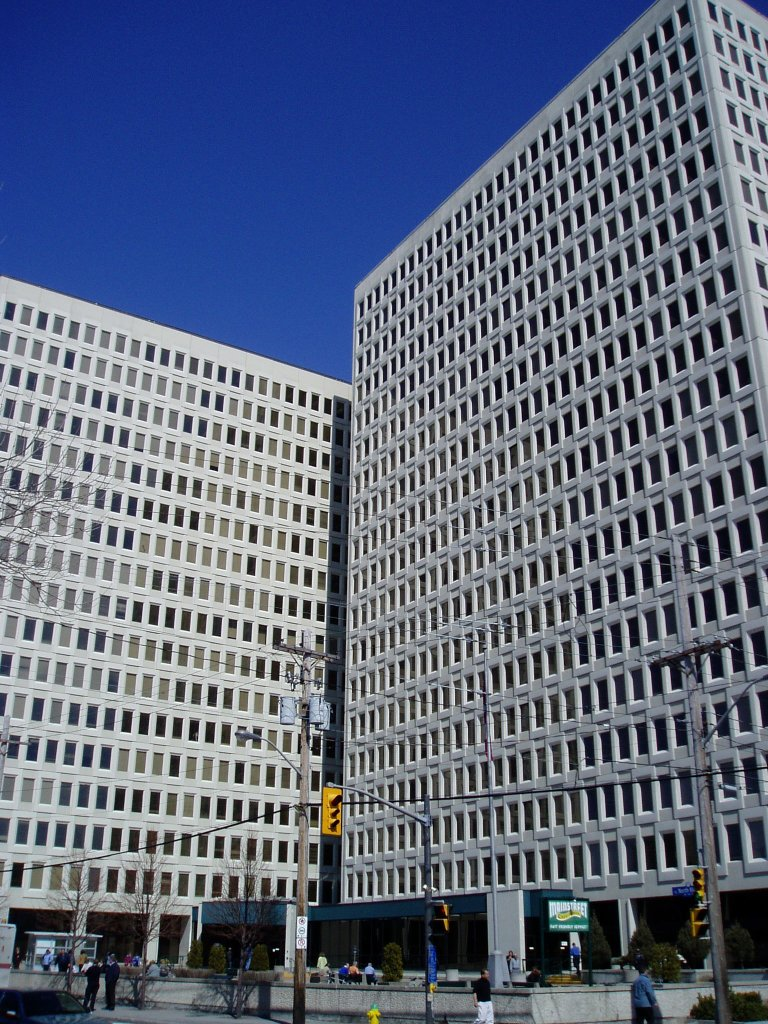

Place Vanier is an office building complex on North River Road in the Vanier area of Ottawa. The building has three towers, and the major tenant in two of them is the federal government of Canada.

== Buildings ==
- Tower A: 333 North River Road
- Tower B: 355 North River Road
- Tower C: 25 Mcarthur Avenue
