= Vanier Canada Graduate Scholarships =

International Postgraduate Award

The Vanier Canada Graduate Scholarships (Vanier CGS) are doctoral scholarships launched by the Government of Canada in 2008. The program is designed to attract and retain world-class doctoral students by offering them a significant financial award to assist them during their studies at Canadian universities. Vanier scholars demonstrate leadership skills and a high standard of scholarly achievement in graduate studies in the social sciences and humanities, natural sciences and engineering, or health-related fields. Scholarship recipients receive $50,000 each year for three years. The program supports up to 166 scholars annually.

The Vanier CGS program helps Canada’s universities attract excellent doctoral students from across Canada and around the world.

== Georges Philias Vanier ==
The Vanier CGS program honours distinguished Canadian soldier and diplomat Major-General the Right Honourable Georges Philias Vanier (1888-1967), who served as governor general of Canada from 1959 to 1967.

== Governance ==
Vanier Canada Graduate Scholarships are administered by Canada's three federal research granting agencies (the Canadian Institutes of Health Research [CIHR], the Natural Sciences and Engineering Research Council [NSERC] and the Social Sciences and Humanities Research Council [SSHRC]).

Vanier CGS nominees are evaluated by agency-specific multidisciplinary peer review committees.
