= Pauline Vanier =

Canadian viceregal consort (1898–1991)

The Honourable Pauline Vanier PC CC
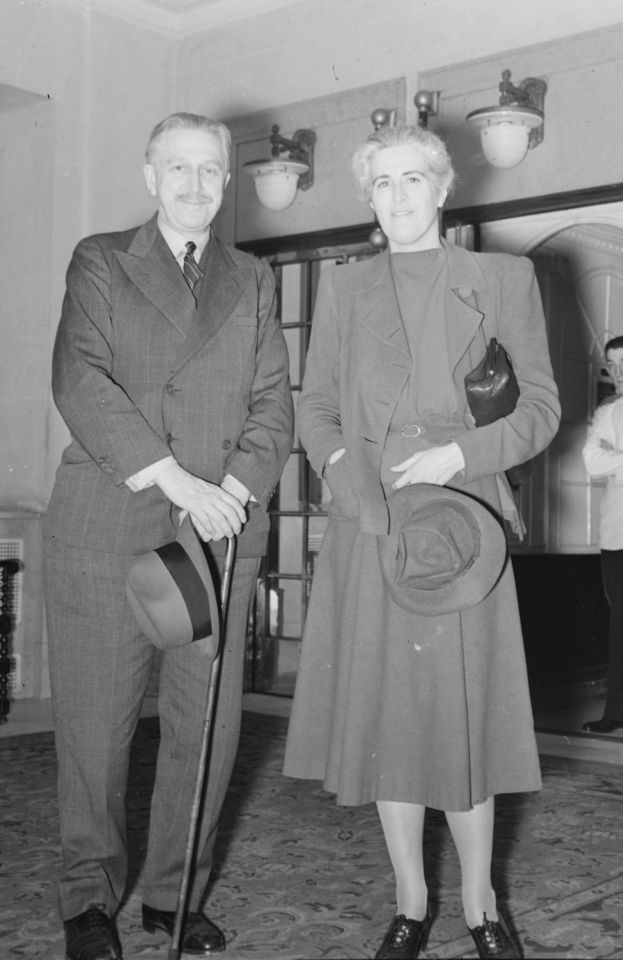
- Georges and Pauline Vanier in 1940
- Born: Pauline Archer; March 28, 1898; Montreal, Quebec, Canada
- Died: March 23, 1991 (aged 92); Trosly-Breuil, France
- Resting place: Memorial Chapel at the Citadelle, Quebec City
- Spouse: Georges Vanier (m. September 29, 1921)
- Children: 5, including Thérèse and Jean

Pauline Vanier, PC, CC, DStJ (née Archer; March 28, 1898 – March 23, 1991) was a Canadian humanitarian who was married to Georges Vanier. Her husband was one of Canada's first professional diplomats, Canada's first ambassador to France, and the first French-Canadian Governor General of Canada from 1959 until his death in 1967. She was the first woman Chancellor of the University of Ottawa as well as the first non-Roman Catholic Bishop to hold the role following the University's reorganization into a public university.

== Life and career ==
She was the daughter of Thérèse (née de Salaberry) and Charles Archer, a judge on the Quebec superior court. Her mother was a descendant of Charles de Salaberry, a military officer and statesman in Lower Canada. With her extensive diplomatic experience, Pauline filled the role of vice-regal consort with as much distinction as her husband filled his. Georges and Pauline Vanier created the Vanier Institute of the Family in 1965.

Madame Vanier was the first non-political woman to be appointed to the Queen's Privy Council for Canada. She was sworn in on April 11, 1967, as a sign of honour from Prime Minister Lester B. Pearson. In July that same year, she was made one of the first Companions of the Order of Canada for her humanitarian work. She was appointed as Chancellor of the University of Ottawa in 1966.

The couple had five children. Their son Jean founded L'Arche, and their daughter Thérèse was a medical doctor who specialized in haematology and palliative care.

== Legacy ==
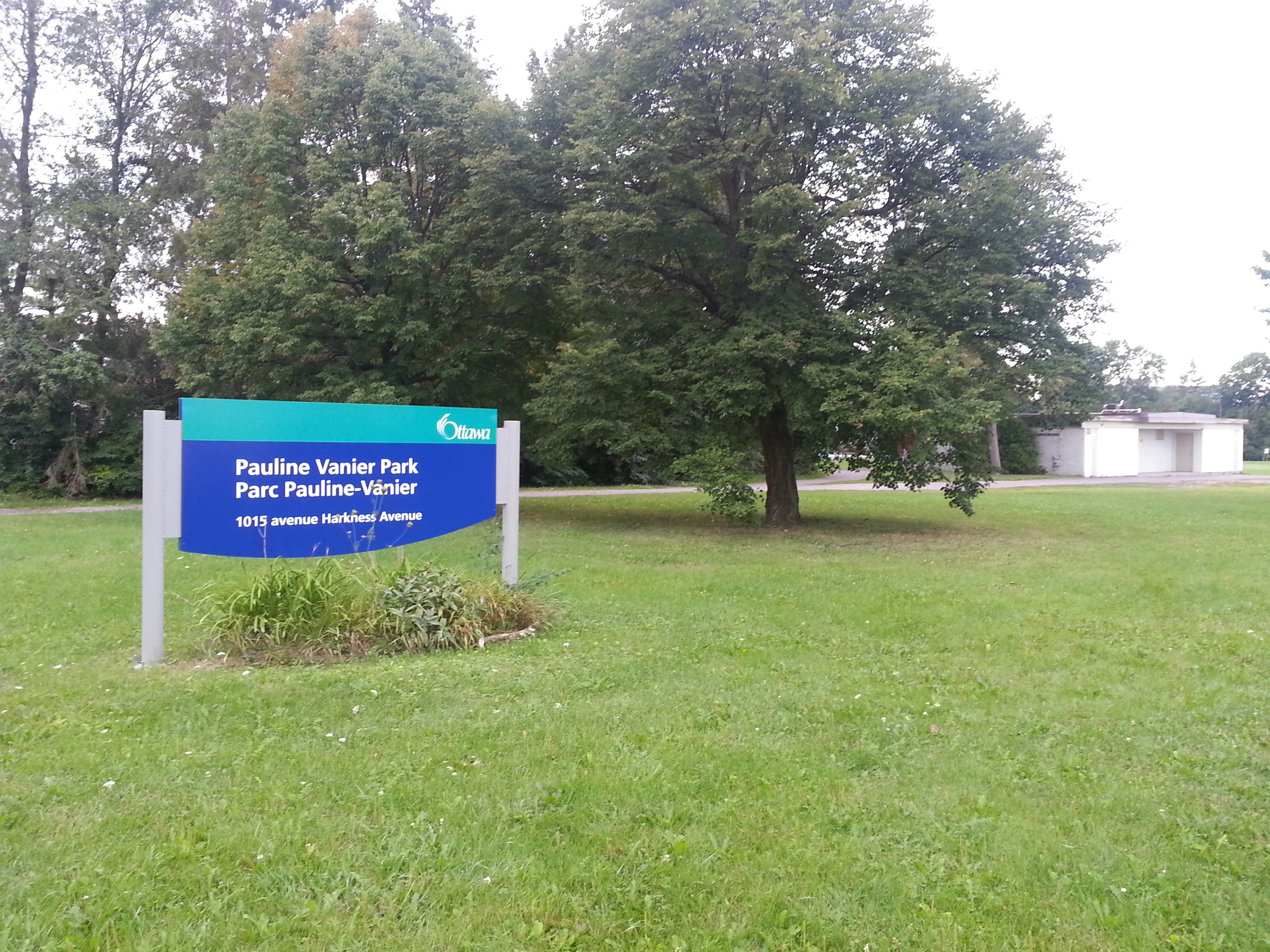
The sign at Pauline Vanier Park in Ottawa

A Catholic elementary school in Brampton, Ontario, is named in her honor, as well as an Ottawa middle school. Madame Vanier Hall, a women's residence at St. Thomas University in Fredericton, New Brunswick, also bears her name. In 1963, London Children's Aid and Catholic Social Services groups got together and created the "Madame Vanier Children's Services". Pauline Vanier Park in Ottawa is named in her honour.

Academic offices
Preceded by Marie-Joseph Lemieux	Chancellor of the University of Ottawa; 1966–1973	Succeeded by Gérald Fauteux
