= Vanier Institute of the Family =

Research and education organization

The Vanier Institute of the Family is a national, independent think tank committed to enhancing family wellbeing by making information about families accessible and actionable. Leveraging networks of researchers, educators, policymakers, and organizations with an interest in families, it says it shares evidence and strengthens the understanding of families in Canada, in all their diversities, to support evidence-based decisions that promote family wellbeing.

Founded by then-Governor General Georges P. Vanier and Madame Pauline Vanier in 1965, the Vanier Institute offers access to publications, research initiatives, presentations and social media content to enhance the national understanding of how families interact with, have an impact on and are affected by social, economic, environment and cultural forces.
