= War memorials (Oise) =

French war memorials commemorating World War I

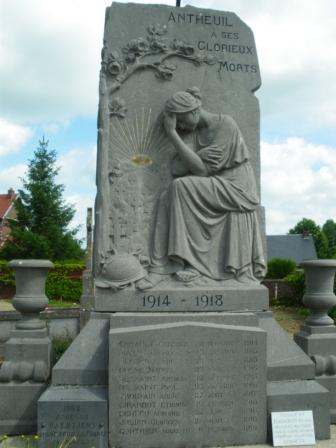
The war memorial at Antheuil-Portes

The War memorials (Oise) or Monuments aux Morts of Oise are French war memorials commemorating those men of the region who died in World War I.

== Background to the involvement of the Oise region in the 1914–18 war ==
The north eastern part of the Oise region, known as "Little Switzerland", was directly involved in World War I . From October 1914 to March 1917 the front had stabilised along a line passing through Lassigny, Tracy-le-Val and Bailly and during two years of occupation the German army lived in the towns and villages of the Noyon area. In March 1917, in a tactical move, the Germans left the region as they moved north to the Hindenburg Line but they left much destruction in their wake. The areas which they vacated were then occupied by the Allied armies. 1918 saw the German "Spring Offensive" when the German army retook the area they had vacated and advanced even further. There were battles fought at Noyon and Mont Renaud in March and April 1918 and at Matz in June 1918, during the Third Battle of the Aisne. Further ferocious battles were fought until August 1918 when Montdidier and the Thiescourt were liberated. All of these efforts helped to stop the German advance on Paris and assisted the Allied success in pushing the Germans back to the Hindenburg Line in the summer and autumn. Apart from the usual trench based skirmishes, the area around the front line suffered much damage and loss of life from constant artillery bombardment and bombing by Zeppelin airships and German aeroplanes. Great devastation was wrought in villages directly on the front line. Ribecourt, Tracy-le-Val, Bailly, Chiry-Ourscamp, and Dreslincourt were almost totally destroyed. Compiègne and Noyon suffered much damage. One German long-range gun in particular, stationed in the forest at Coucy-le-Chateau, caused much devastation. The bombing reached as far as Beauvais where in June 1918, 36 soldiers and civilians were killed. Breteuil, Crèvecœur-le-Grand and Crépy-en-Valois were all hit by bombs. Finally, the Armistice was signed at Rethondes on 11 November 1918

== Some of the Monument aux Morts in the Oise ==
Below are details of just some of the many monuments aux morts in the Oise region.

Work	Image	Location	Date(s)	Subject, notes and references
Monument aux Morts at Antheuil-Portes	The war memorial at Antheuil-Portes- A montage	Antheuil-Portes. Oise	1925	A montage of photographs of the Antheuil-Portes monument aux morts is shown here. This is one of Établissements Rombaux-Roland's editions, one that can be seen throughout France. The Antheuil-Portes monument aux morts dates from 1925 and the inauguration took place on 17 May 1925. A grieving young woman sits before a soldier's grave. A discarded helmet lies on the ground.
Monument aux Morts at Appilly		Appilly		The monument aux morts at Appilly features a sculpture by Marius-Léon Cladel (1883–1948). Cladel's composition features a widow and her daughter standing before the grave of her husband. The monument dates from 1929 and the inauguration took place on 6 October 1929.
Monument aux Morts at Auneuil		Auneuil	1920	The war memorial in Auneuil which features a work by the Italian sculptor Pierre Lorenzi is a memorial made and marketed by Fonderie d'art du Val d'Osne. The work features the bronze bust of a French World War I infantryman and this particular work can be seen throughout France, sometimes with the French flag draped to the rear of the bust. The Auneuil monument was inaugurated on 22 June 1920.
Monument aux Morts at Baron		Baron	1921	The 1921 war memorial in Baron is the work of the sculptor Albert Jouanneault, who served in the French army and was taken as a prisoner of war by the Germans. He executed other memorials, such as the war memorial at Stenay in the Meuse, a memorial to Dupetit-Thouars in Saumur and a bust of Jean Jaurès in L'Hay les Roses, in Val de Marne. The inauguration of the Baron monument took place on 24 July 1921.
The Monument aux Morts at Beaumont-sur-Oise	Beaumont-sur-Oise	Beaumont-sur-Oise		This Monument aux Morts shows the horror of war with a soldier slumped against a large field gun and carrying the National flag.
Monument aux Morts at Beauvais	The war memorial at Beauvais	Beauvais	1924	Beauvais, the capital of the Oise region, is the site of a war memorial by Henri Gréber. The monument was inaugurated on 6 July 1924. Gréber was seemingly inspired by the mémoires of a Lieutenant Péricard who wrote that during an attack on the Yser in 1914 he had imagined that he had seen dead soldiers rise up to give assistance.
Monument aux Morts at Carlepont		Carlepont	1921	The commune of Carlepont, just south of Noyon, holds a 1921 war memorial by the sculptor Joseph André who was based in Noyon. The Carlepont monument was inaugurated on 16 August 1921. Although born in Belgium, André was responsible for several war memorials in the Oise region and in Grandru, Porquericourt and Ville.
Monument aux Morts at Champagne-sur-Oise	The Monument aux Morts at Champagne-sur-Oise	Champagne-sur-Oise		Jean Bozzi's composition at Champagne-sur-Oise depicts a soldier who is using his bayonet to carve the names of the four great battles of the war on part of the monument: The Marne, The Yser, Verdun and the Somme. The Italian-born Bozzi had studied at the School of Beaux-arts in Naples and became naturalised as a French citizen in 1890. He had served and fought in the French Army.
Monument aux Morts at Chantilly		Chantilly	1922	The Chantilly war memorial features a bronze work by Laurent Marqueste which is an allegory of "Victory". The same image can be seen on the monument at Blamont in Meurthe-et-Moselle. The Chantilly monument dates from 1922 and was inaugurated on 12 November 1922.
Monument aux Morts at Compiègne		Compiègne	1922	The Compiègne war memorial features a work by Maxime Real del Sarte (1888–1953). It was inaugurated on 11 November 1922 and the work was reputedly inspired by Jean-François Millet's painting "L'Angelus".
Monument aux Morts at Criel		Criel	1926	The Criel war memorial, meant to represent "Peace", was executed by Georges Armand Verez, winner of a competition to select Creil's monument. The monument is classed as one of the "pacifistes" memorials and was completed in 1925.
Monument aux Morts at Crépy-en-Valois	Crépy-en-Valois war memorial	Crépy-en-Valois	1925	Crépy-en-Valois's war memorial by Albert Bartholomé features a woman weeping over the corpse of a dead soldier, a replica of the "le soldat gisant" statue commissioned in 1918 by Marie Henriette Bernard de Sassenay, for the tomb of her son, Jacques Benoist de Laumont. Albert Bartholomé completed the Crépy-en-Valois sculpture for free in memory of his deceased wife who had been born in the nearby village of Bouillant. It was inaugurated on 11 November 1925. It was Albert Bartholomé who was responsible for the famous Monument aux Morts in the Pere Lachaise cemetery. See detail from this Monument aux Morts below. There is also a notable Bartholomé sculpture in nearby Bouillant this being for the grave of his wife.

== Albert Bartholomé, the Crépy-en-Valois Monument aux Morts and other works ==
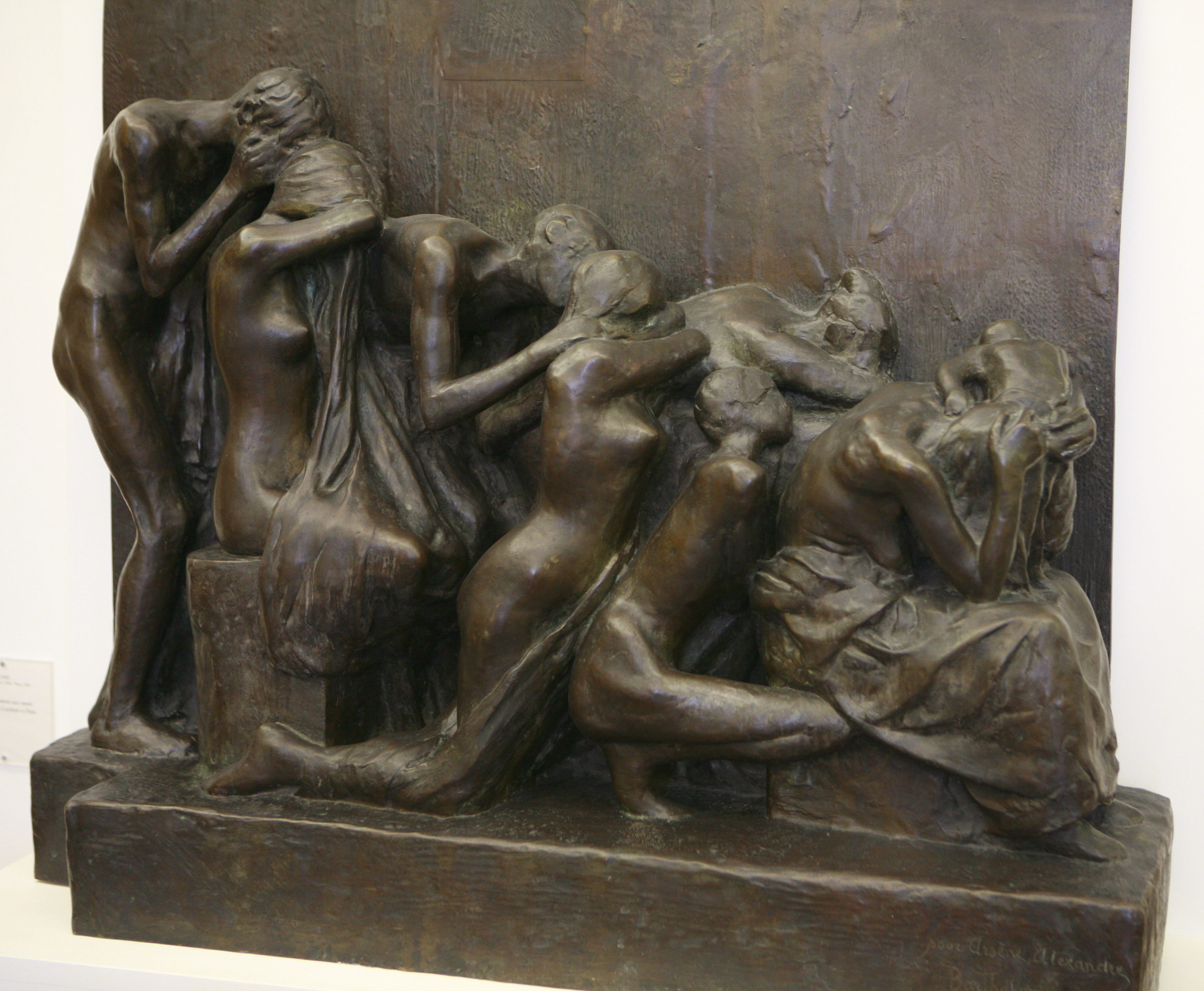
Bartholomé work at Père Lachaise.

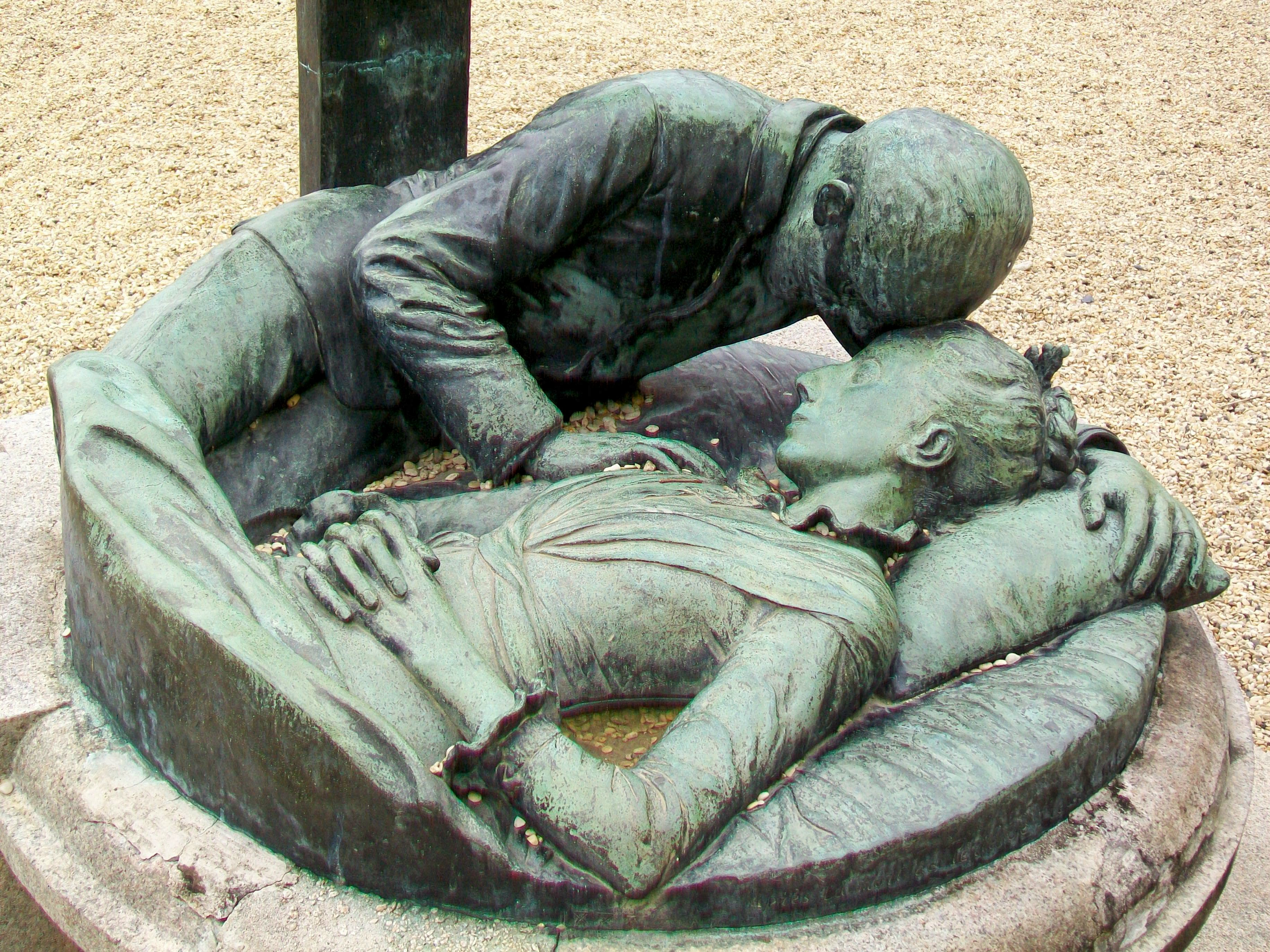
Bartholomé's sculpture on his wife's grave at Bouillant near Crépy-en-Valois

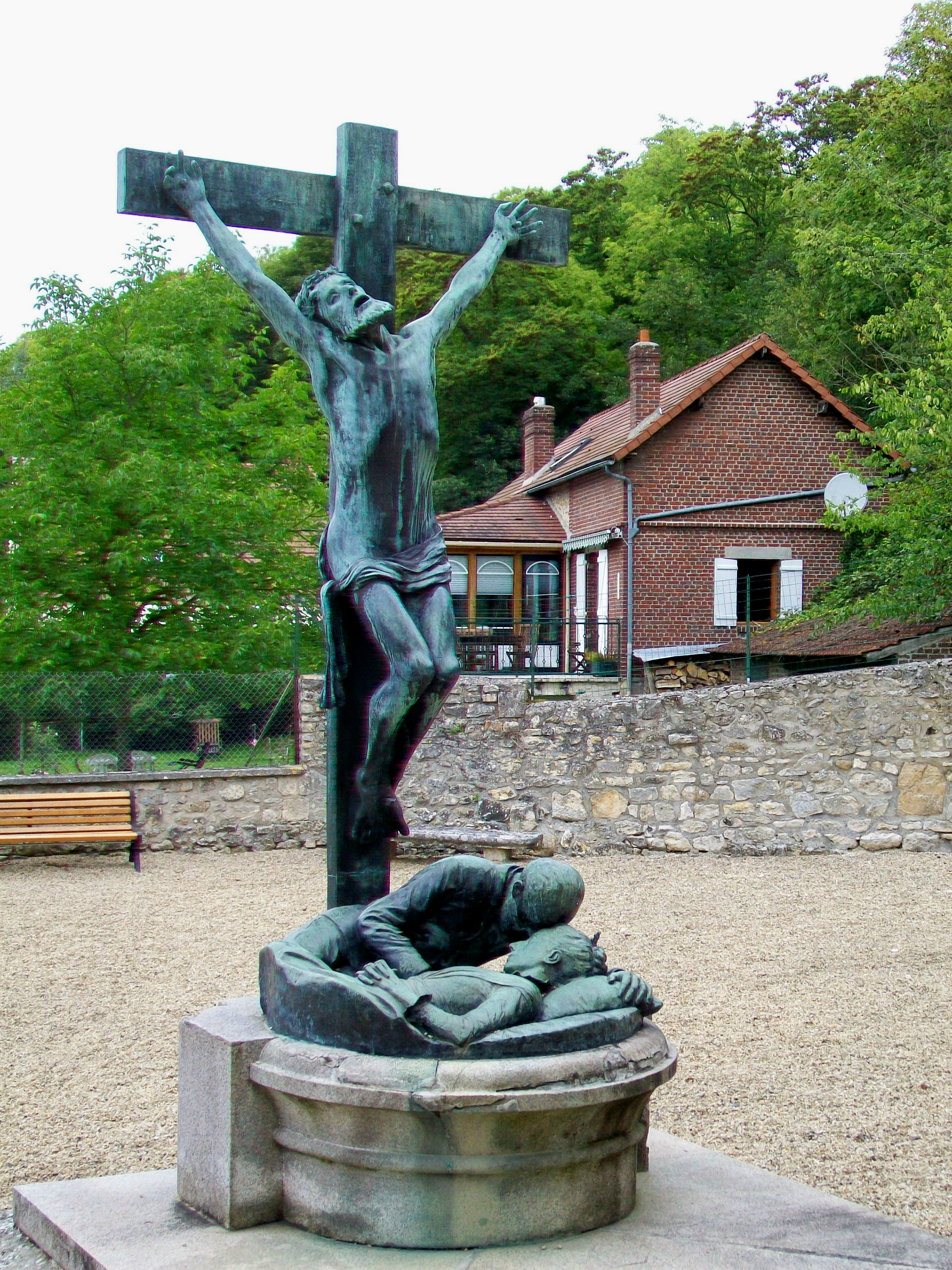
Bartholomé's sculpture on his wife's grave at Bouillant near Crépy-en-Valois

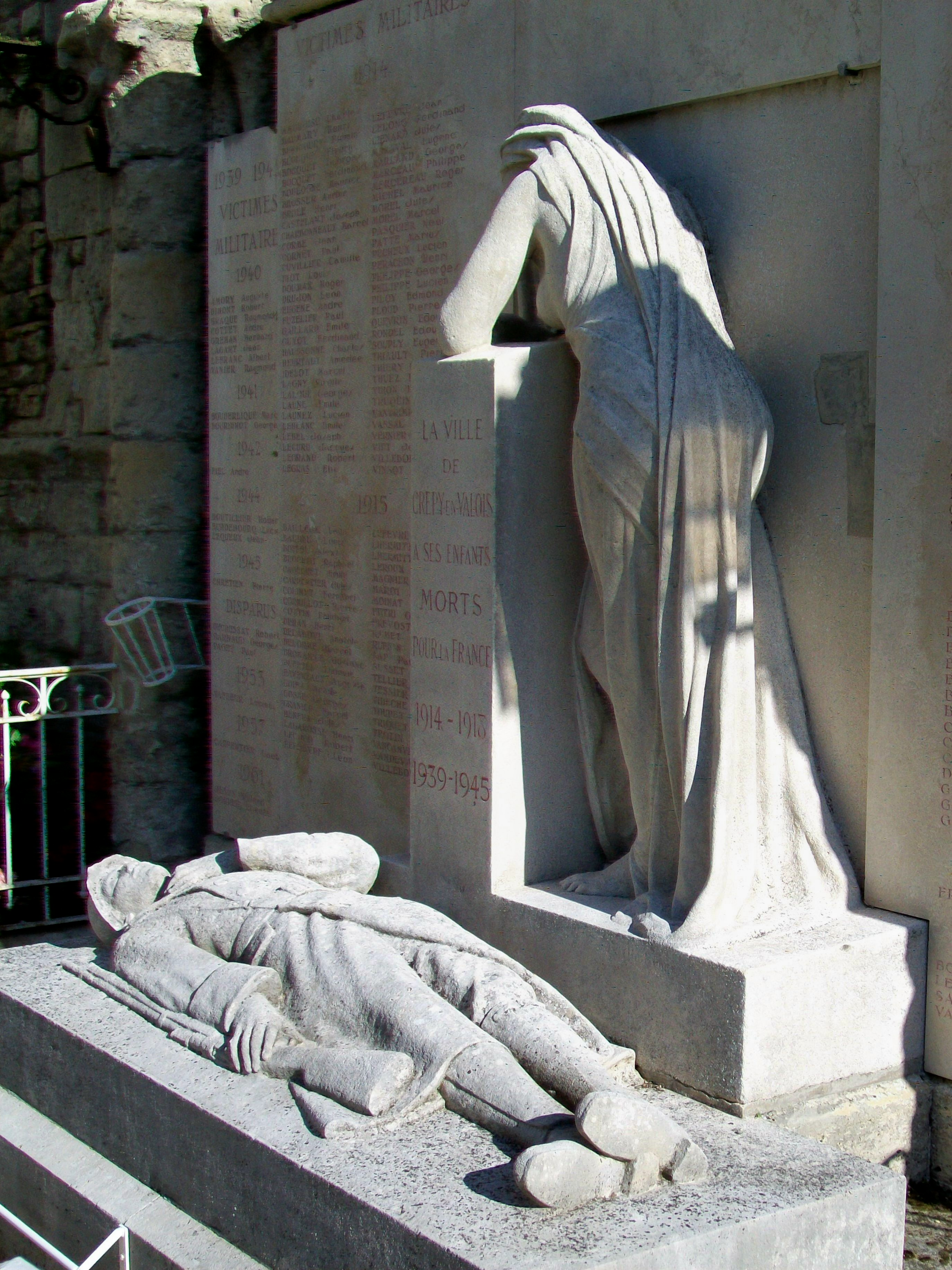
The Crépy-en-Valois war memorial

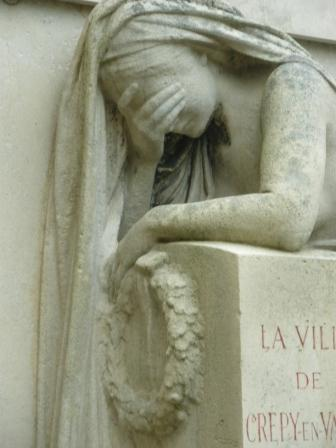
A close up of a section of the Crépy-en-Valois war memorial

Work	Image	Location	Date(s)	Subject, notes and references
Monument aux Morts at Doméliers		Doméliers	1923	The war memorial at Doméliers features a bronze relief medallion, the work of Léon Hernot and seen on many war memorials in France albeit with slight variations. Sometimes just the medallion is featured or it is superimposed on a vertical palm or is coupled with laurel branches. This memorial dates from 1923 and the inauguration took place on 28 October 1923.
Monument aux Morts at Formerie	Old postcard of Formerie war memorial.	Formerie. Oise	1921	This war memorial entitled "Coq modele D" features a gallic cock, a bronze marketed by Société Antoine Durenne throughout France beginning in 1921. There were two variations; the cock is either standing on a flat platform as in the Formerie memorial, or standing on a globe. The Formerie monument was inaugurated on 25 September 1921.
Monument aux Morts at Grandvilliers		Grandvilliers	1920	Albert-Dominique Roze who lived in the Oise region was the sculptor of the war memorial in Grandvilliers. The Grandvilliers war memorial features a standing soldier (poilu). This particular Roze work is duplicated in Allery, Quend and Valines in the Somme. It is also found at Ribemont-sur-Ancre, although in this case the rifle was held in the left hand and not the right. The Grandvilliers memorial was made in 1920 and inaugurated on 11 November 1920.
Monument aux Morts at Marquéglise	The war memorial at Marquéglise	Marquéglise	1924	The Marquéglise war memorial by Marcel Pierre de Bréal includes high-reliefs around the pedestal that show various stages in the life and death of a soldier. At the top of the pedestal is an allegory of France topped by a helmet bound by laurel. "France" holds a crown of laurel in each hand. The work was executed in 1924. Over time the high-reliefs have become worn due to exposure to the elements.

The following are photographs of the four high-reliefs:

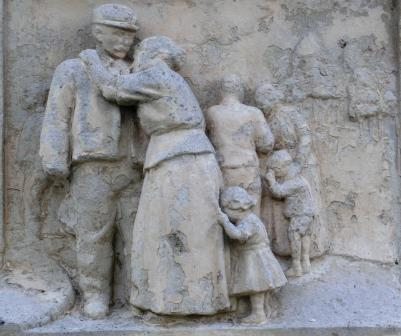
The soldier has been mobilised and says farewell to his loved ones.

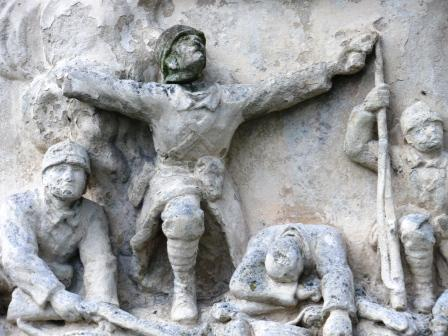
The soldier takes part in an attack launched from the trenches

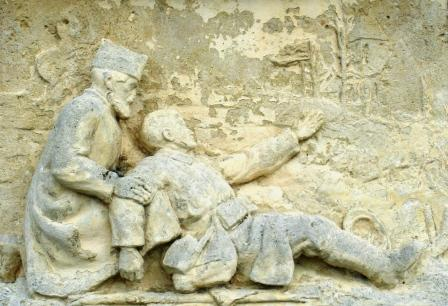
The soldier is mortally wounded and sits dreaming of his home, including the bell-tower of Marquéglise church which we see in the sculptor's relief.

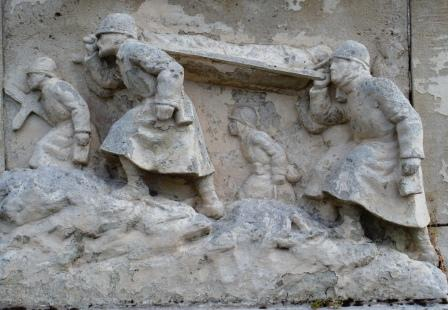
The soldier is carried off for burial

Work	Image	Location	Date(s)	Subject, notes and references
Monument aux Morts at Neuilly-en-Thelle		Neuilly-en-Thelle	1921	In Neuilly-en-Thelle is a war memorial that features the "Soldat vainqueur", a piece made by sculptor Léon Leyritz and marketed by the foundry Société Antoine Durenne. The Neuilly-en-Thelle memorial was inaugurated on 16 October 1921.
Monument aux Morts at Noyon	Monument aux Morts at Noyon	Noyon	1925	The Noyon memorial, shaped like an artillery shell, is located in the Place du Parvis. It was designed by the Paris architects Eugene Chifflot and René Lefevre. The door of the crypt, built into the centre of the monument, has an angel of victory carved on it together with the name Noyon surmounted by the Noyon coat of arms flanked by the Cross of the Légion d'honneur and the Croix de Guerre

The four bas-reliefs on this monument are the work of Émile Pinchon. The reliefs depict some aspects of Noyon's fate over the 4 years of the war.

1. The taking of hostages by the Germans on 29 September 1914
2. The re-entry of French troops of the 13th Corps on 18 March 1917
3. The ruins of Noyon on 25 August 1918
4. The presentation to the town of the Légion d'honneur and Croix de guerre on 10 July 1920 by Maréchal Joffre.
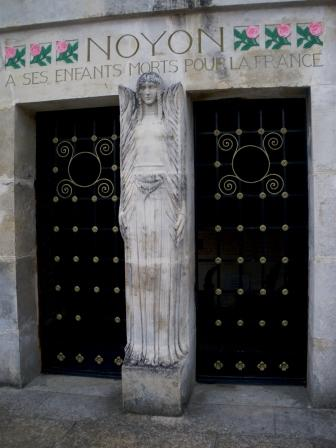
The statue by the entrance to the crypt at Noyon's war memorial.

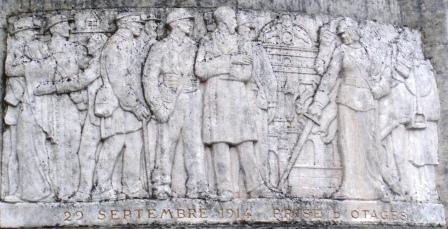
The relief on the Noyon war memorial commemorating the taking of hostages by the German Army on 29 September 1914

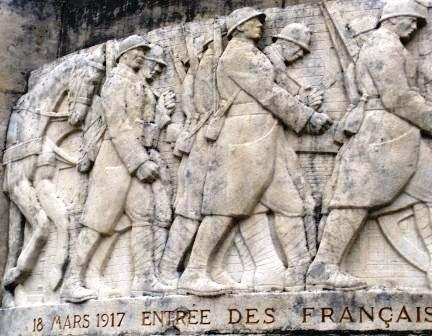
The relief on the Noyon war memorial commemorating the re-entry of the 13th Army Corps on 18 March 1917

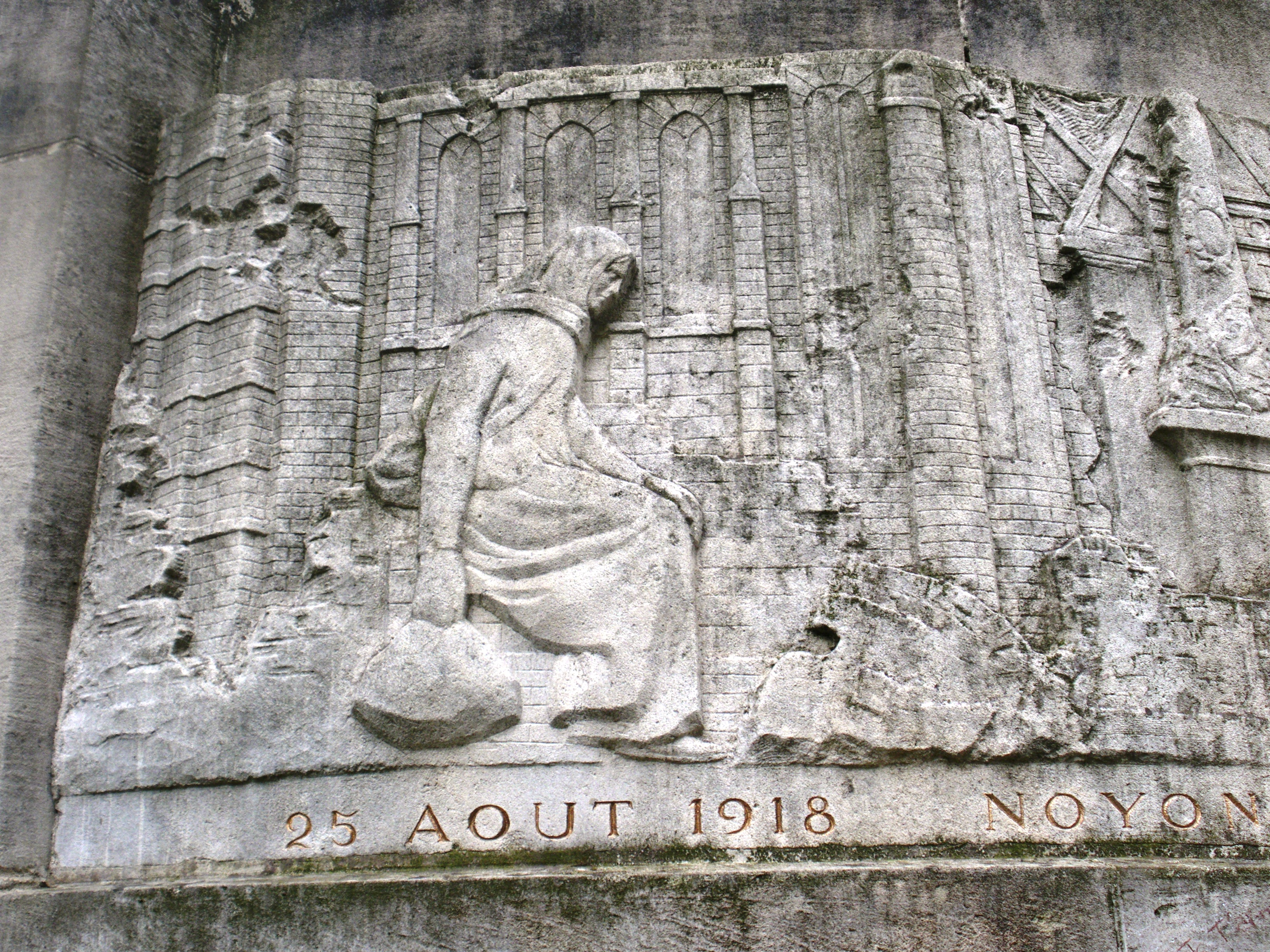
Part of the relief on the Noyon war memorial showing the ruined state of Noyon after the 1914-1918 war. Here a woman sits amidst the ruins

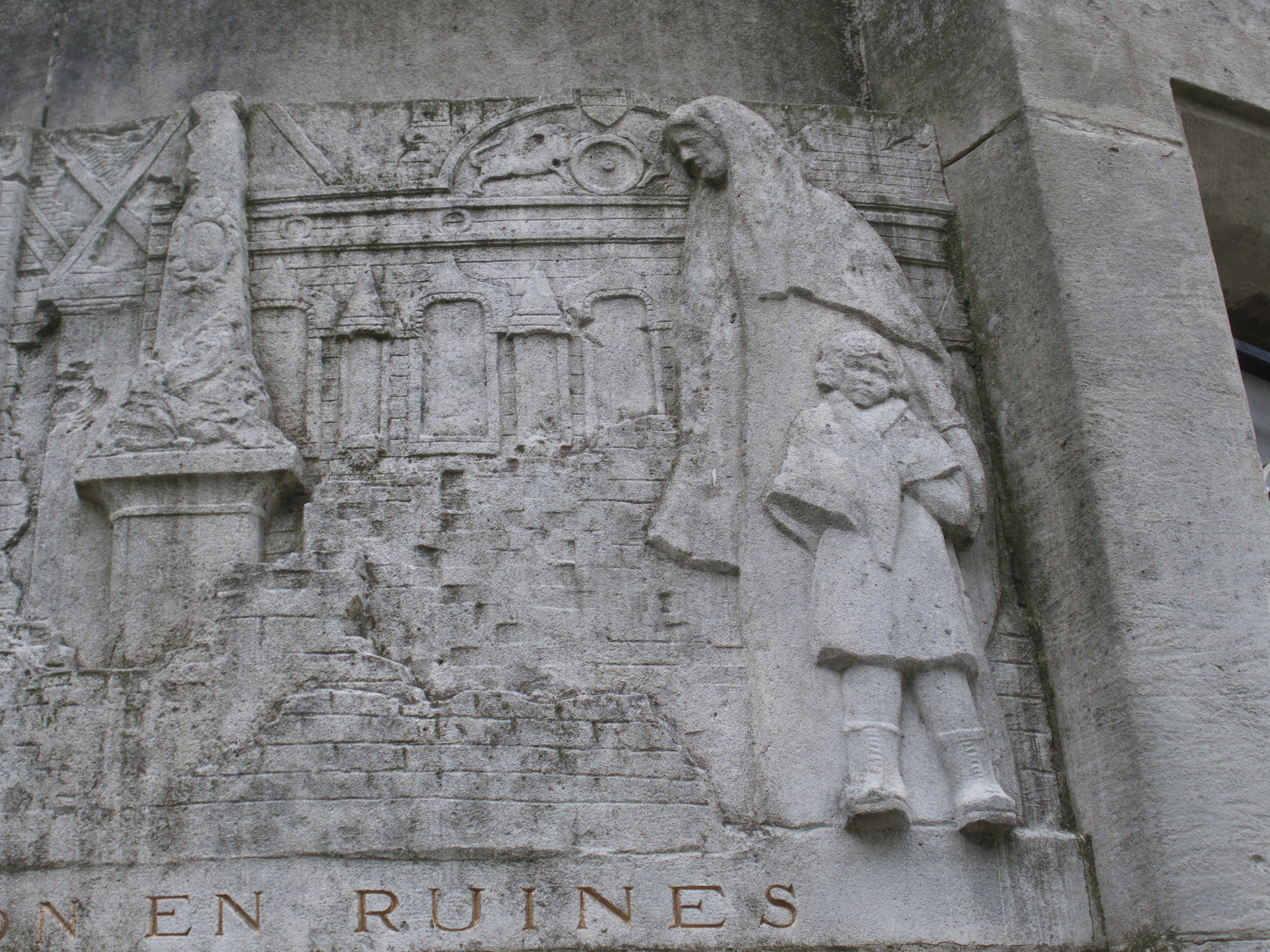
The remaining part of the relief showing the ruins of Noyon. Here a woman and child are featured

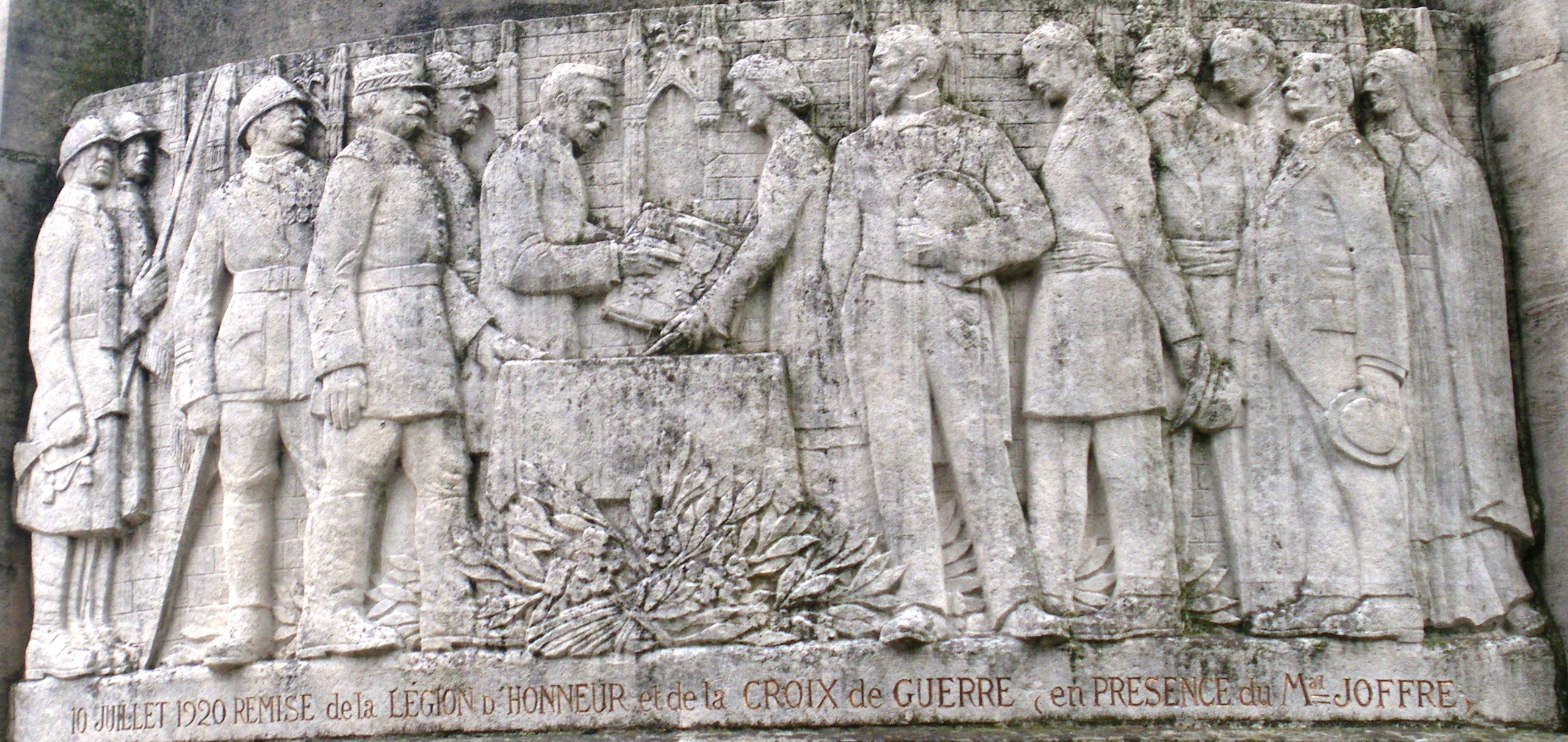
The relief on the Noyon monument aux mort which records the presentation to Noyon on 10 July 1920 of the Légion d'honneur and the Croix de guerre in recognition of the suffering and fortitude of the citizens of Noyon during the German occupation

The Noyon war memorial was inaugurated on 22 March 1925.

Work	Image	Location	Date(s)	Subject, notes and references
Monument aux Morts at Remy		Remy	1920	This commune's war memorial features an Établissements Rombaux-Roland bronze. It dates from 1920 and the war memorial was inaugurated on 22 August 1920. This bronze gallic cock can be seen throughout France being one of Établissements Rombaux-Roland's most popular pieces. Sometimes the cock stood on a half - globe with laurels or on a full globe or as at Remy on a flat platform. As was usual with Établissements Rombaux-Roland the sculptor remains anonymous.
Monument aux Morts at Ressons-sur-Matz		Ressons-sur-Matz		The sculptor of Ressons-sur-Matz's war memorial was Maxime Real del Sarte. The plaster model of this work, entitled "je t'ai cherché" was exhibited at the Salon des Artistes Française in 1920 and there are several examples of the work in monuments throughout France. It was said that the likeness of the soldier was based on Charles Eudes, one of Maxime Real del Sarte's comrades at the front. Maxime Real Del Sarte was recommended as the sculptor for the Ressons-sur-Matz war memorial by the writer Binet-Valmer who had taken part in the liberation of the village in 1918. The war memorial at Ressons-sur-Matz was completed in 1924.
The Monument aux Morts at Ribécourt-Dreslincourt		Ribécourt-Dreslincourt	1924	The merger of two villages in 1970 means that we have two war memorials, one in each pre-merger village. That at Ribécourt remembers the 26 men killed and features a sculpture of a French soldier. It was inaugurated on 24 August 1924. The war memorial at Dreslincourt was erected three years later and is an obelisk surmounted by a Croix de Guerre. Both memorials in Ribécourt and Dreslincourt were badly damaged during World War II.
The Ferme de Navarin Monument	Memorial World War the armies of Champagne, built in 1923-1924 by Maxime Real del Sarte	Souhain		Maxime Real del Sarte's composition features a group of three soldiers in "attack" mode. Reportedly the soldier in the centre was meant to represent a likeness of General Gouraud. The soldier on the right was supposedly based on Quentin Roosevelt, the nephew of Theodore Roosevelt who was killed near Cambrai on 14 July 1918, and the soldier on the left was said to be based on Maxime Real del Sarte's brother, killed in the Champagne during the war. Del Sarte himself was injured fighting in the Éparges section of the Verdun front on 29 January 1916 and part of his left arm had to be amputated. The monument remembers the efforts of the French army units who fought in the area.
Monument aux Morts at Saint-Samson-la-Poterie		Saint-Samson-la-Poterie	1921	The relief on the Saint-Samson-la-Poterie war memorial is by Louis Maubert. It is dated 1921 and was inaugurated on 9 October 1921. The design and model of the relief was made in 1916 when it first became obvious that a monument was going to be needed by each and every community. The organisation "Souvenir Français" intended that this design to be the "official" monument, but the work was subject to criticism and the concept of a monopoly for war memorials was unpopular. This work was marketed by Établissements Hubert Coignet et Cie of Gennevilliers in Hauts-de-Seine. Amongst Maubert's other works are the monument commemorating Leon Chiris in Grasse, Alpes-Maritimes and a bas-relief on the tomb of Montaud Deluns in Clamart, Hauts-de-Seine. Maubert was also the sculptor of the war memorial of Mazingarbe.
Monument at Senlis		Senlis	1923	The war memorial at Senlis is the work of Gaston Dintrat who worked on several war memorial including those at Voiron, Joyeuse and Valence. The war memorial at Senlis was inaugurated by Monsieur Poincaré on 15 July 1923 and features two reliefs by Dintrat. The monument marks the furthest point reached by the Germans on 2 September 1914. Senlis is also the site of the war memorial created for Casablanca by Paul Landowski and moved to Senlis after Morocco received her independence. The monument shows a Moroccan Spahi shaking the hand of a French cavalryman.
Monument aux Morts at Tricot		Tricot	1924	The war memorial at Tricot dates from 1922 although the inauguration did not take place until 5 October 1924. This figure of a "poilu" is identical to that at Bougainville in the Somme region.
Monument aux Morts at Verneuil-en-Halatte		Verneuil-en-Halatte		Verneuil-en-Halatte's war memorial is titled "Le Coq gaulois écrasant l' aigle allemand " (English: The Gallic Rooster crushing the German Eagle).

== Gallery ==
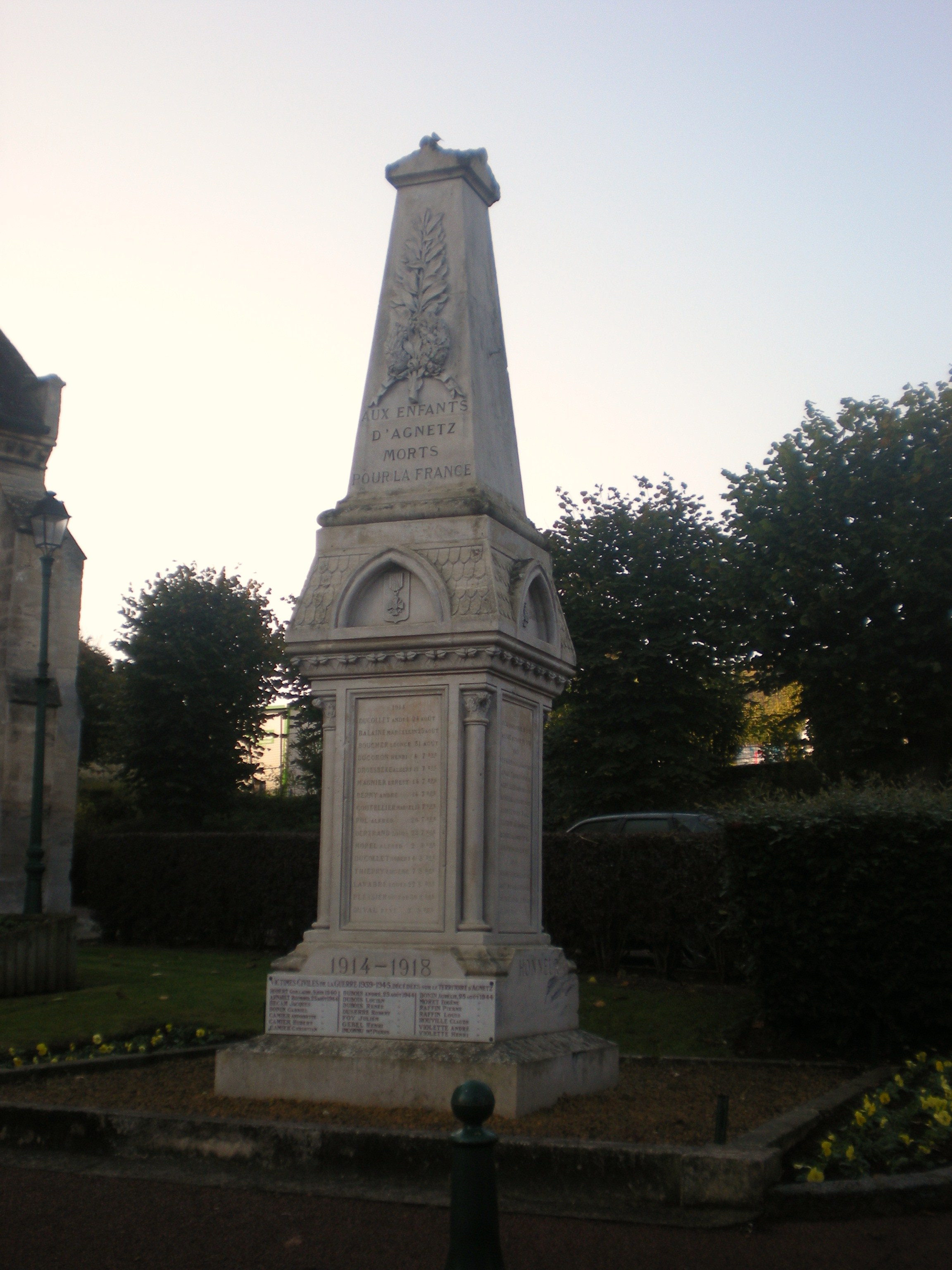
The war memorial of Agnetz (Oise)

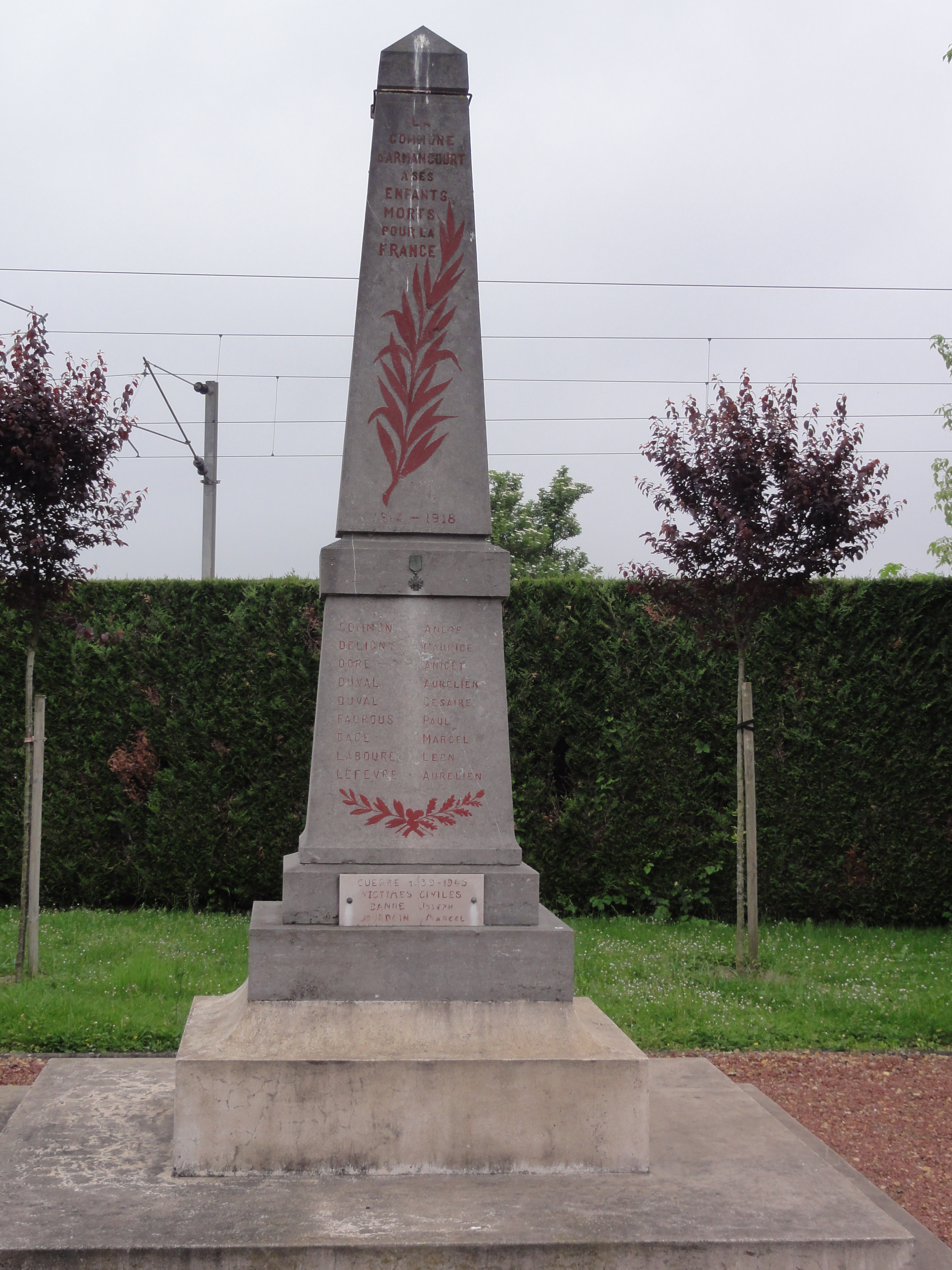
Armancourt (Oise) war memorial

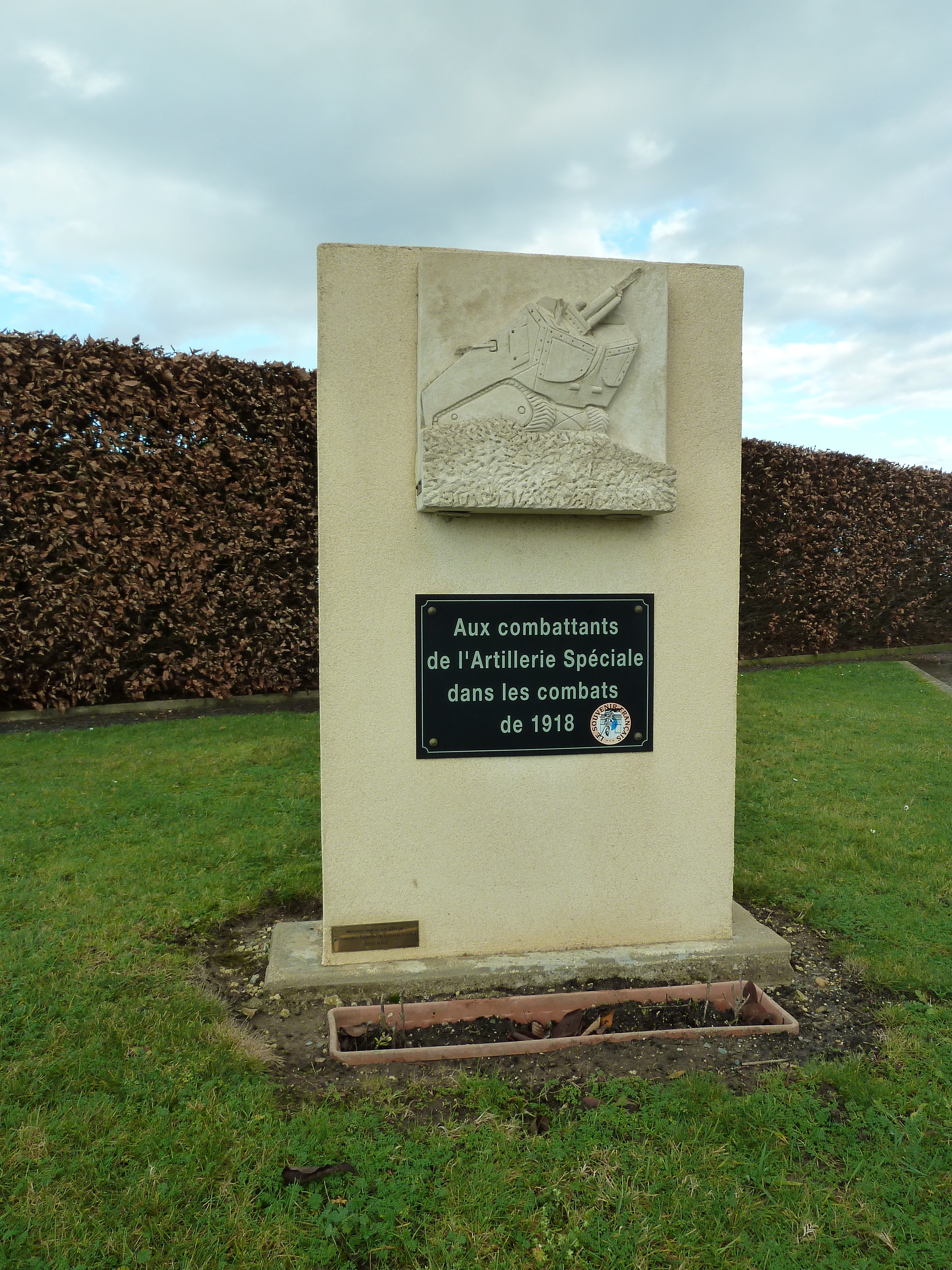
Special artillery - Necropolis French military Mery-La-Bataille - Mery-the-Battle - Somme - France

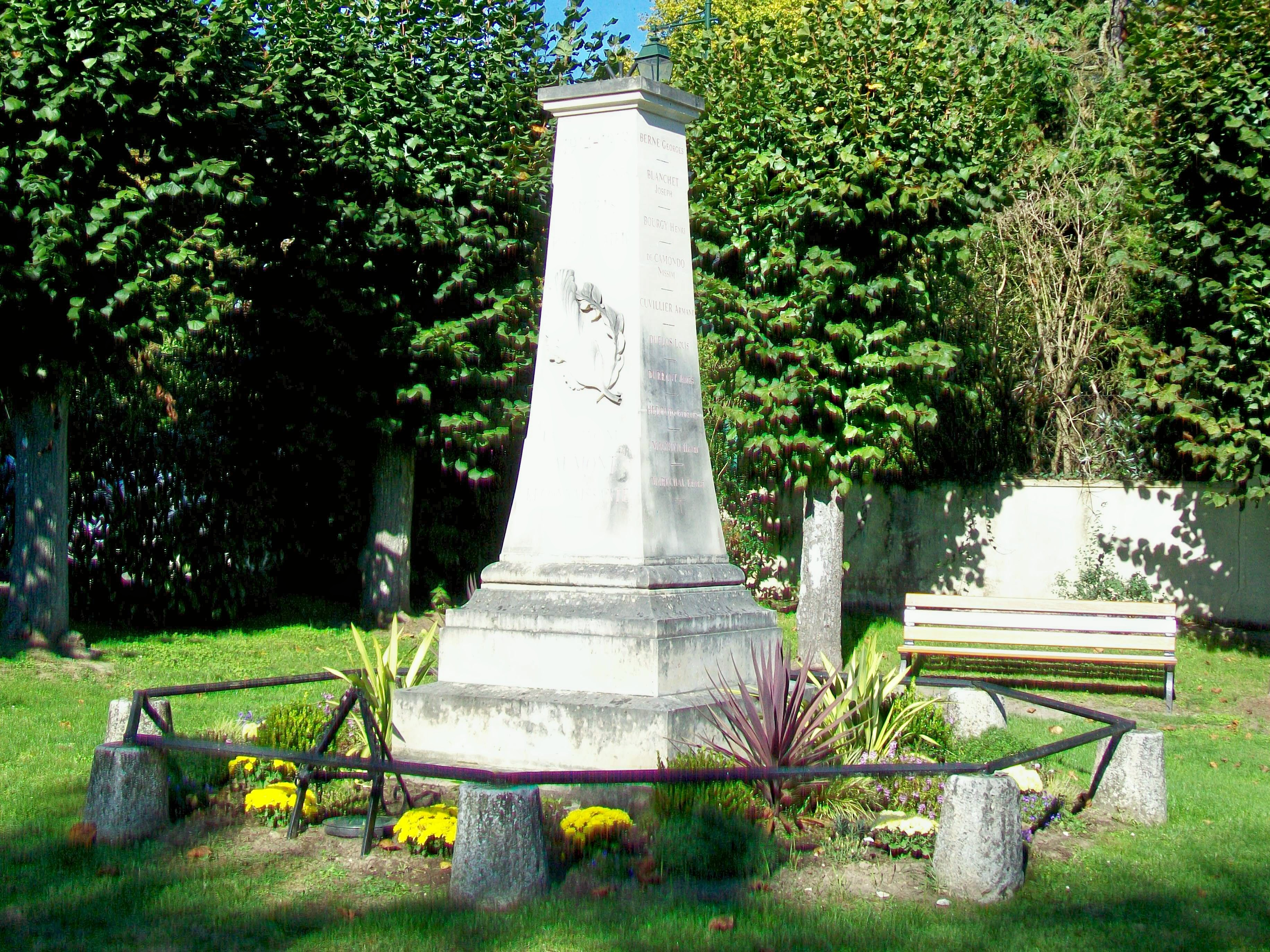
The Aumont-en-Halatte war memorial in 1920, before the church.

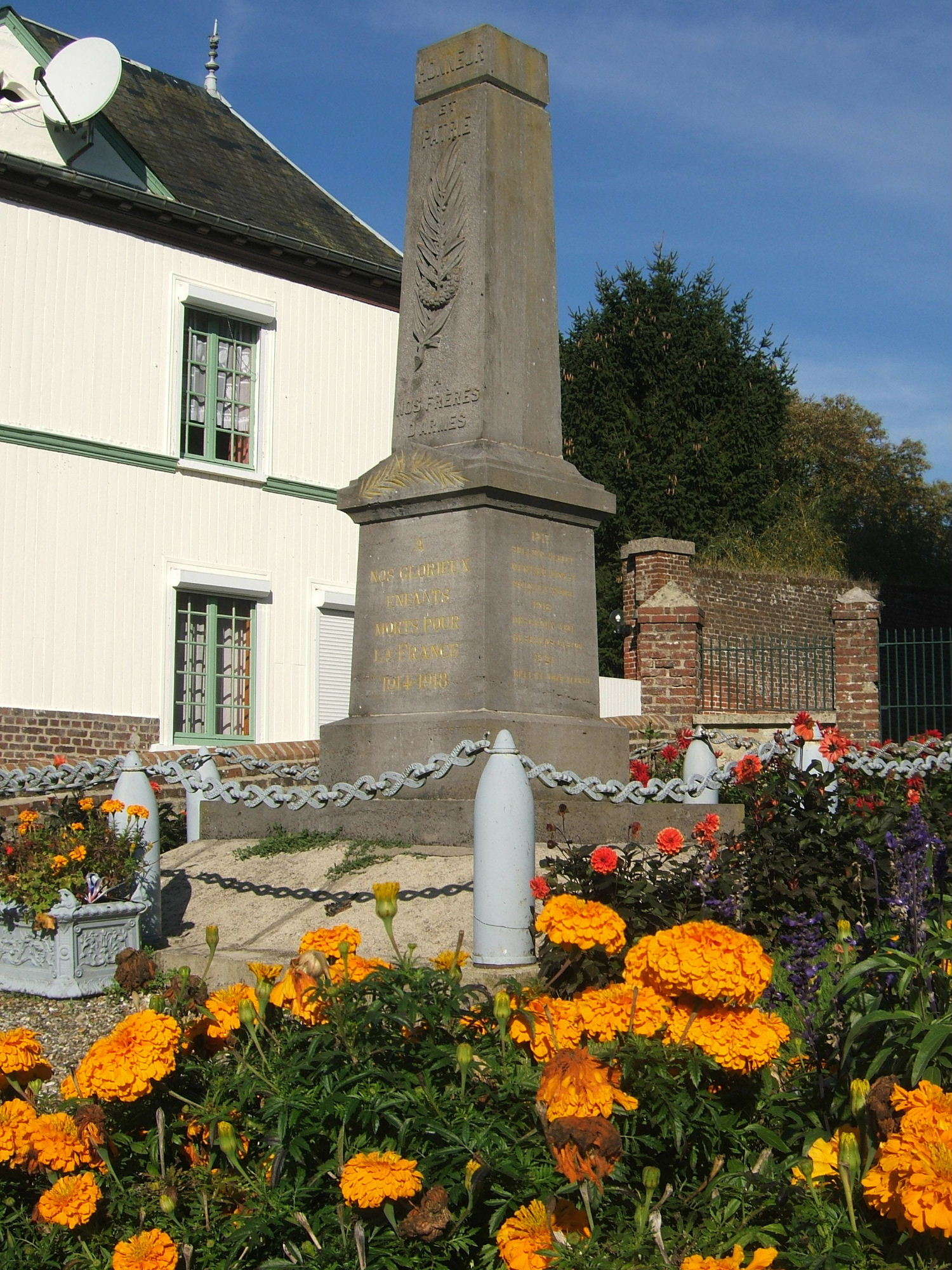
War memorial in Canny-sur-Thérain (Oise, France)

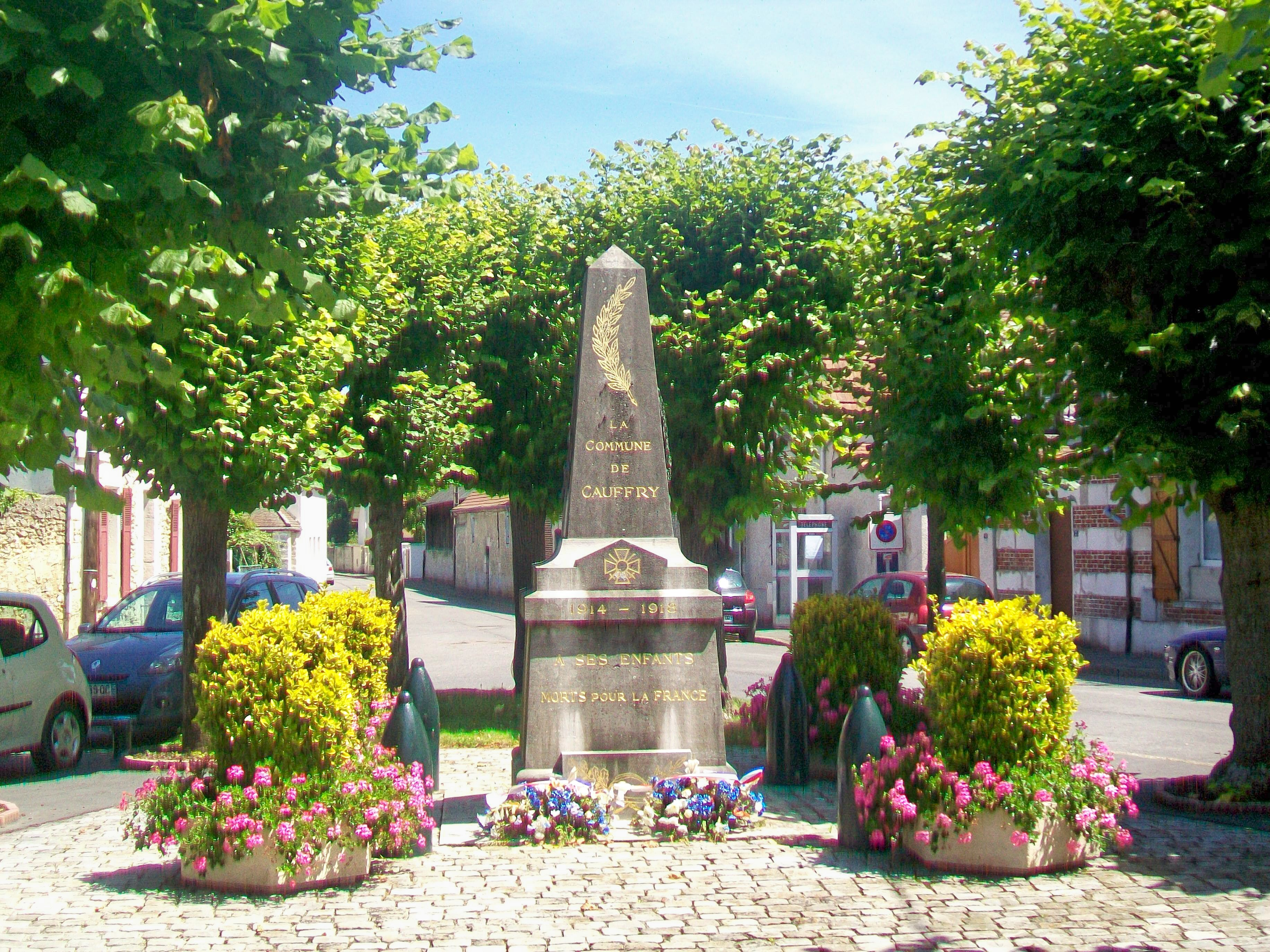
The Cauffry memorial in the square opposite the old town hall.

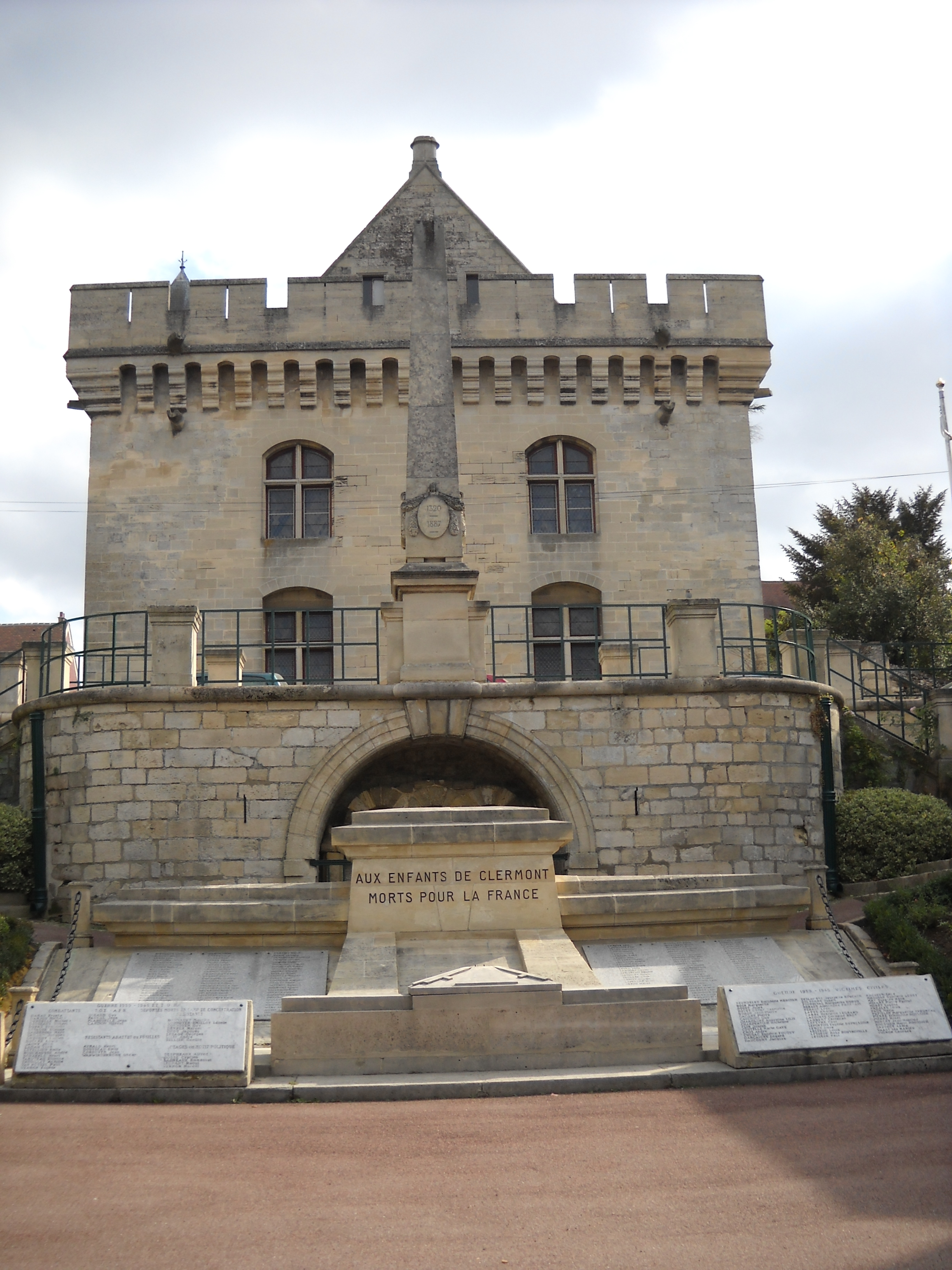
The war memorial of Clermont, Oise, France.

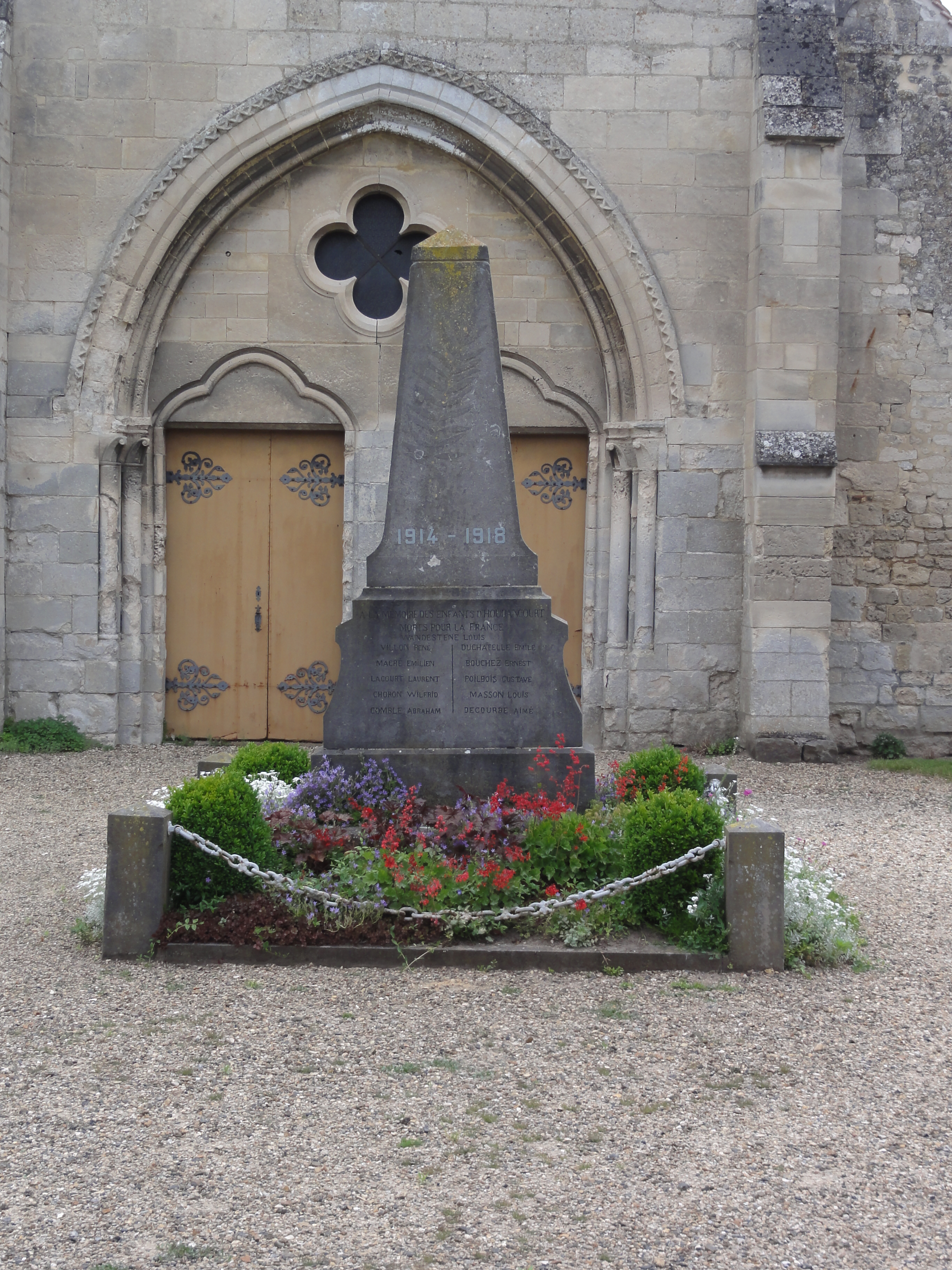
Houdancourt (Oise) Monument

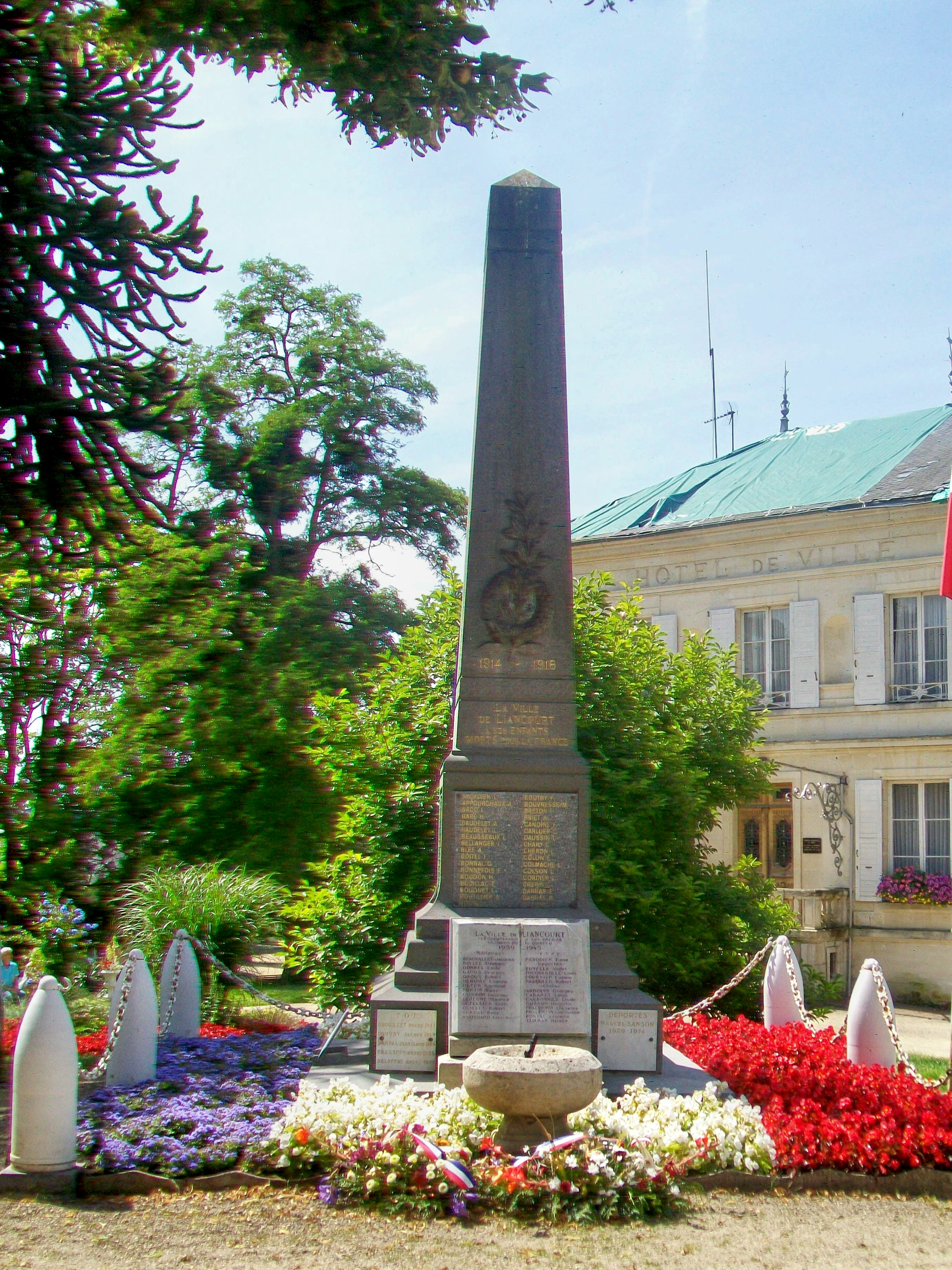
The Liancourt memorial, outside City Hall.

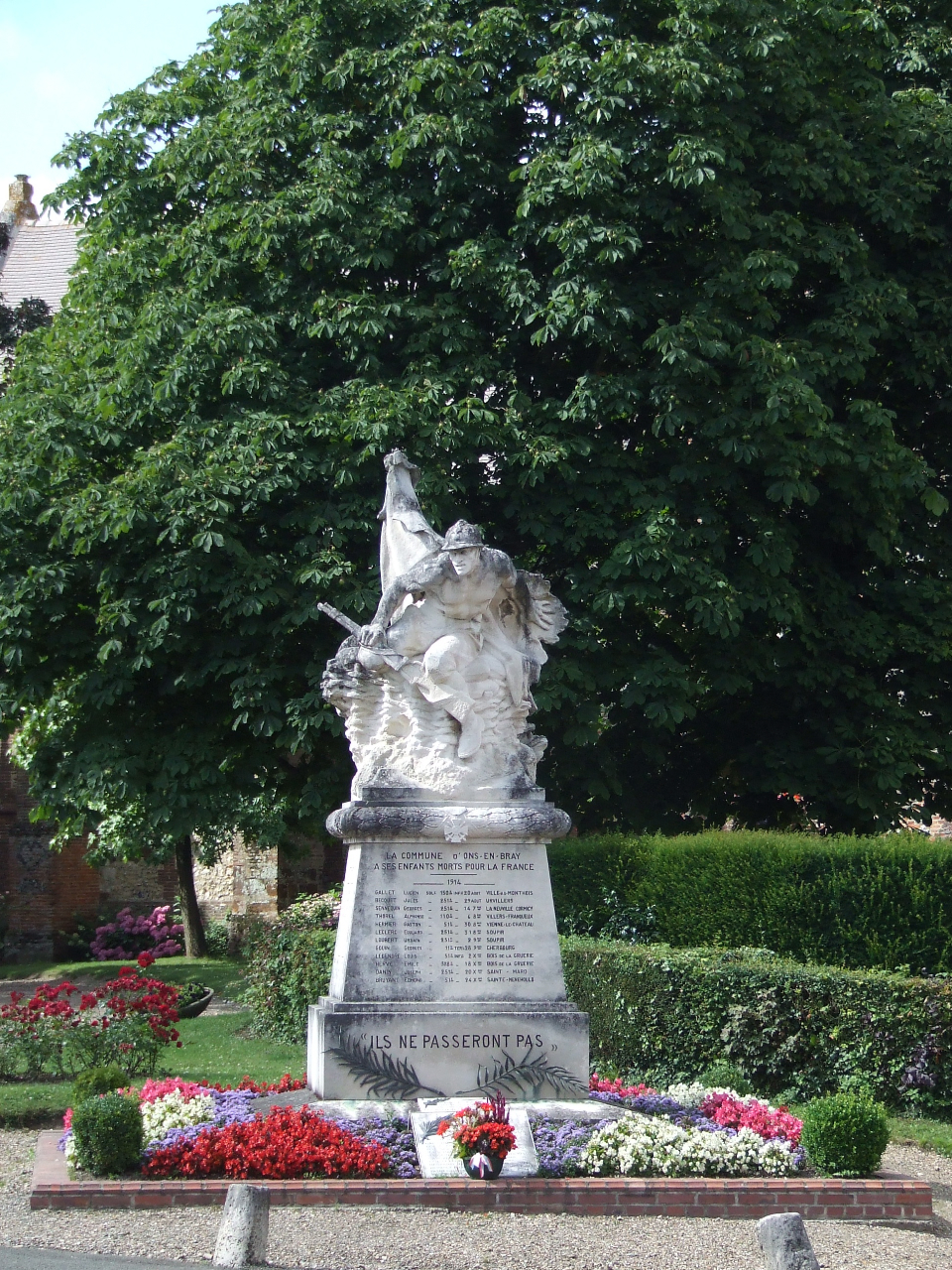
War memorial of Ons en Bray

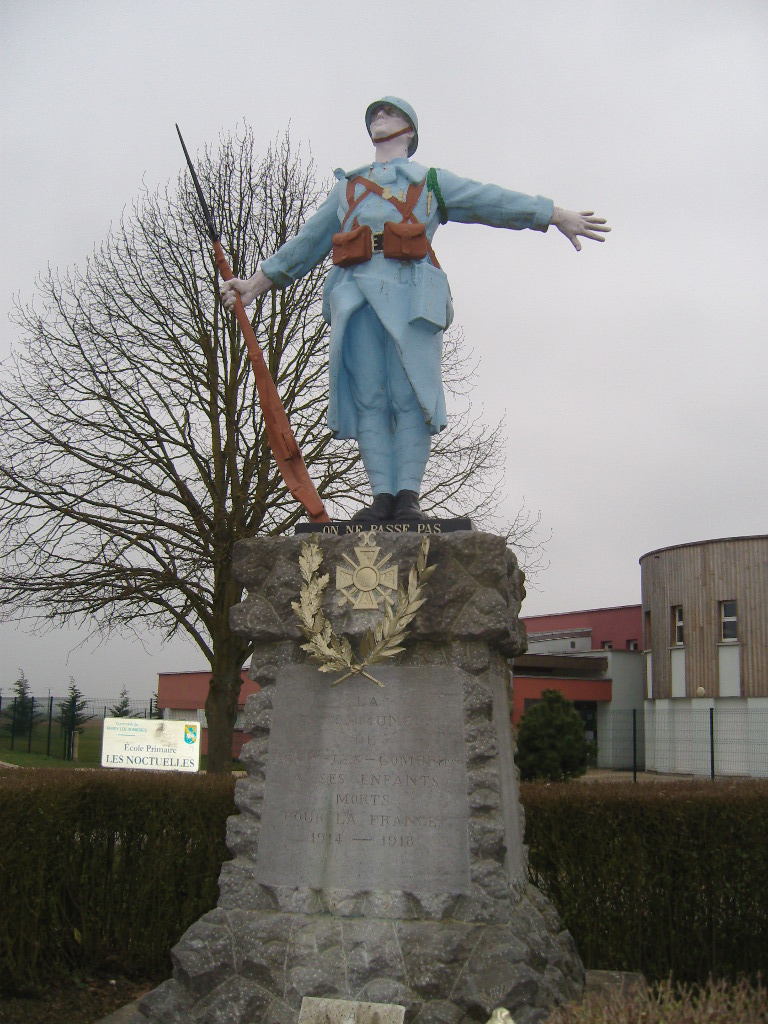
Memorial Peroy-the-Gombries (Oise - France), representing a soldier in the War of 1914-1918 in horizon blue uniform who is saying "None shall pass".

== See also ==
- World War I memorials
- War memorials (Aisne)
- War memorials (Eastern Somme)
- War memorials (Western Somme)
