= Sisters of Mary Morning Star =

Roman Catholic reglious institute

- Formation: 2014; 12 years ago
- Founded at: Bergara, Spain
- Type: Religious congregation
- Members: 350
- Website: mariastellamatutina.org

The Sisters of Mary Morning Star, also called the Sisters of Maria Stella Matutina, are a Roman Catholic religious institute of non-cloistered contemplative sisters. The sisters do not perform missionary or educational work, focusing primarily on prayer and spiritual guidance.

== History ==
When sectarian deviance (and subsequently sexual abuse) was revealed among the contemplative sisters of the Community of St. John, Cardinal Philippe Barbarin appointed a new prioress general in June 2009 to replace Alix Parmentier. In November 2009, the Holy See placed the community under the supervision of an apostolic commissioner, Jean Bonfils. A split emerged between the sisters who accepted this appointment and a majority who rejected it, led by influential nuns within the community, notably Marthe (Louise) Hubac.

The sisters who did not accept the appointment attempted to establish a new community in the diocese of Saltillo, Mexico, where they had been welcomed by Bishop José Raúl Vera López, but the Holy See did not give its authorization. An association of the faithful for a religious institute was founded on June 29, 2012, in the diocese of Cordóba, under the name "Institute of St. John and St. Dominic." This association was dissolved on January 10, 2013, by Cardinal Tarcisio Bertone at the request of Pope Benedict XVI.

In 2014, the Holy See allowed the foundation of a new community at the monastery of Trinidad de Bergara in the diocese of San Sebastián in Spain, led at the time by Bishop José Ignacio Munilla, on the condition that the four leaders of the contemplative sisters of St. John leave the community (Alix Parmentier, Marthe (Louise) Hubac, Isabelle Hubac, and Agnès Godemel). Nevertheless, it appeared that they continued their religious life within the new community. Alix Parmentier was buried "with great pomp" by the Primate of Spain, Braulio Rodríguez Plaza, Archbishop of Toledo, "in religious habit, which the Vatican had forbidden."

It was in reference to this dissolved community that Pope Francis spoke on February 5, 2019, of "the enslavement of women by clerics and the founder." These remarks were tempered the following day by the director of the Holy See Press Office, who referred to "manipulation, a form of abuse of power that also translates into sexual abuse."

The sisters are close to the brothers of Verbum Spei, also dissidents from the St. John community, who regularly come to preach in the convents of Maria Stella Matutina. Like them, they intend to remain faithful to the legacy of Marie-Dominique Philippe, founder of the community from which they originate, despite the revelation of his sexual abuse. Typically, they "celebrate the anniversary of Marie-Dominique Philippe's death each year with a specific liturgy included in their psalter."

In 2022, the community's headquarters were transferred to the Diocese of Parma. In 2025, the community had 350 members.

== Locations ==
In the United States, the order has convents in Ghent, Minnesota, Monona, Wisconsin, and Waco, Texas. In Australia, there is a community in Brisbane.

The Texas priory has worked with death row prisoners in Gatesville, Texas since December 2021. Of the seven women the sisters have worked with (including Kimberly Cargill, Brittany Holberg, Melissa Lucio, and Darlie Routier), six chose to convert to Catholicism and to become oblates.
