= Religieuses abusées, l'autre scandale de l'Église =

2019 French documentary television film

- Poster
- Directed by: Eric Quintin, Marie-Pierre Raimbault
- Country of origin: France
- Original language: French

Production
- Producer: Arte
- Running time: 97 minutes

Original release
- Network: Arte
- Release: 5 March 2019

Religieuses abusées, l'autre scandale de l'Église (lit. 'Abused religious [women], the other scandal of the Church') is a French documentary television film by Eric Quintin and Marie-Pierre Raimbault in collaboration with Elizabeth Drevillon. The film, which was first shown on Arte on 5 March 2019, deals with sexualised violence by clerics against nuns and the attempts of the Catholic Church to cover up these acts. It premiered on Australian television channel SBS Viceland on 30 August 2019 under the English title of Sex Slaves of the Catholic Church. From 8 March to 10 May 2022, it was available online with English subtitles. The English version will be available again from 1 April 2026.

== Synopsis ==
The film deals with sexual abuse of women within the Catholic Church, especially nuns. It shows that nuns all over the world have been and are sexually abused by clerics hierarchically above them. The cases of Marie-Dominique Philippe and Thomas Philippe, who both raped nuns in France for decades without the church intervening, play a central role in the film's first section (53 minutes).

The second section of the film (40 minutes) focuses on sexual abuse of nuns in congregations in Africa and the Americas, such as the order of missionary sisters of a former nun identified as "Constance" (nun from 1996 to 2017). Constance said that many priests made having sex with them a precondition before helping them ("saving salvation"), and because many women were dependent on priestly help, they had no option to refuse unwanted sexual advances. The systematic rapes allegedly even extended to structures in which religious sisters were sold to priests as if they were sex slaves. Dozens of unwanted pregnancies have resulted from the sexual abuse. In the 2011 case of Congolese sister "Grace", who was raped by a priest from her community, she was forced to leave her congregation of the Little Sisters of Nazareth in Rome in disgrace, to live in exile in Pesario, to give birth, to give up her child for adoption, and then in March 2012 she was expelled from her congregation. More often, however, the pregnant nuns were forced to have an abortion, despite being taught by Catholic theology that it is the gravest of sins. Constance reported that, of the about 50 nuns that were students at her Catholic university in an unidentified West African country, 32 were forced into having an abortion at a local hospital after being raped and getting pregnant by sexually abusive priests.

In 2018, the Vatican acknowledged that the reports were well-founded and that the problem persisted.

The filmmakers tried to arrange a meeting of two protagonists of the film with Pope Francis in April 2018. Since, after much insistence, the Vatican in mid-December 2018 only offered a private audience with the pope without witnesses, the women concerned rejected this meeting. The narrator closes the film with the statement: "At the wishes of our witnesses, we refused to once again relegate the voices of the victims to the secrecy of a private audience and to contribute to the silence of the Holy Father on the issue of the sex slaves in the Catholic Church."

== Backgrounds ==
The film is based on three years of research. Quintin explained that this time was needed to obtain trust from the victims, as well as other witnesses and Catholic Church officials who were trying to protect them and hold ecclessiastical authorities accountable. Director Marie-Pierre Raimbault told Les Décodeurs (a website of French newspaper Le Monde): "The victims were very hesitant. (...) We had to show them that we were there, benevolent, attentive and reliable. (...) These are women who have suffered in their status as women, as human beings but also as nuns – from a spiritual point of view, there is great suffering too. So they don't necessarily take your word for it: they're afraid to speak up, to be betrayed again, not to be heard. For months and months, it was necessary to maintain the bond created." She added that the MeToo movement of 2017 helped victims to find the courage to come forward and speak out. Those who told their stories felt a sense of relief and liberation from the suffering they had been hiding for years, according to Raimbault.

Doris Wagner, one of the (former) nuns affected to have her say in the film, had already previously drawn attention to the problem of sexualised violence against nuns, for example in her autobiographical book Nicht mehr ich - die wahre Geschichte einer jungen Ordensfrau or with an article in the Catholic cultural magazine Stimmen der Zeit. She could also be seen in the film #Female Pleasure. In 2019 her second book Spiritual Abuse in the Catholic Church was published.

In the 1990s, several nuns had already drawn attention to the widespread sexual abuse in African monasteries, among them Maura O'Donohue, who in 1994 sent a report to Rome on cases in 23 countries. This report was only published in 2001 by the National Catholic Reporter. Only then did a statement from Rome confirm these cases, but despite the many documented cases from different countries, the problem was relativized as "within a limited geographical area". Later that year, the then Pope John Paul II asked for an apology to the victims in a message.

== Reception ==
On April 20, 2019, a court issued an injunction prohibiting one individual from continuing to present the film to Arte in its media library, whereupon it was removed. Arte challenged that decision and the film was eventually allowed to be re-aired online. It was available on Arte's website to view from March 8, 2022 to March 7, 2024. An English version will be available from April 1, 2026.

Between March 5 and April 5, 2019, when it was removed from Arte's video-on-demand platform, it was viewed 495,721 times in France.

== See also ==
- Catholic Church sexual abuse cases
