= Community of St. John =

Roman Catholic religious organization

Congregation of Saint John
- Logo of the Saint John Family
- Abbreviation: CSJ
- Formation: AD 1975; 51 years ago
- Founder: Marie-Dominique Philippe
- Type: Catholic religious order
- Headquarters: Rimont (Fley), France
- Leader: Father François-Xavier Cazali (brothers), Sister Paul-Marie (contemplative sisters), Sister Claire-de-Jésus (apostolic sisters)
- Website: https://brothers-saint-john.org

The Saint John Family (mostly known as the Community of Saint John) is a religious order composed of three French Catholic congregations: the Brothers of Saint John, the Apostolic Sisters of Saint John, and the Contemplative sisters of Saint John. It also comprises oblates (laypeople who have committed to the group).

The communities, while remaining separate and independent institutions, share a common history and spirituality. The Dominican priest Marie-Dominique Philippe founded the Brothers of Saint John in 1975, the Contemplative Sisters of Saint John in 1982, and the Apostolic Sisters of Saint John in 1984.

The Saint John Family is a Catholic religious order which draws heavily from the writings of John the Evangelist. Members live in communities structured around prayer and apostolic life. Studies, particularly in philosophy and theology, also have an important place in the members' lives.

Since 2013, several women have spoken out about prolonged and devastating sexual, psychological and spiritual abuse that they have suffered within the Community of St. John, including from the founder of the Community.

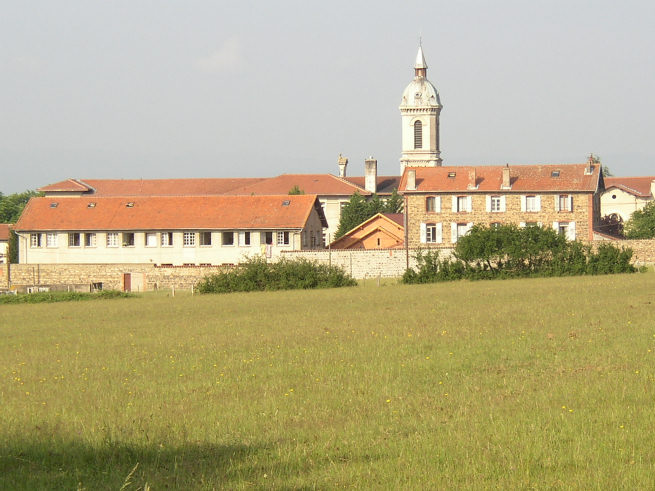
Priory and novitiate of philosophical studies in Saint-Jodard

== History ==
In 1975, a group of five students of the University of Fribourg asked Marie-Dominique Philippe to be their spiritual father. On Marthe Robin's advice, he accompanied them in their desire for monastic life. In 1978, this group was ad experimentum linked to the Cistercian monastery Lérins Abbey and was then named Community of St. John. In 1982, the first monastery was founded in Rimont (Burgundy), and the novitiate was opened in 1983 in Saint-Jodard (diocese of Lyon). Until 1996, the community was expanded with many foundations in France and other countries.

From 1996 to 2004, the community had a number of difficulties, marked by departures and the obligation to restructure. In 2000, the Collège Stanislas de Paris was no longer under the direction of the congregation, after a decision by Cardinal Lustiger. In 2001, Father Marie-Dominique Philippe left the management of the community to Father Jean-Pierre-Marie; he also stopped teaching in 2003 after a request of the Catholic hierarchy. In 2004, Monseigneur Joseph Madec became the religious community's assistant. On 26 August 2006, Marie-Dominique Philippe died in Saint-Jodard (Loire) and Pope Benedict XVI paid tribute to him.

== Activities ==
The community organizes numerous sessions for young people, for families, and many other spiritual retreats based on various themes. In February 2006, the community made a pilgrimage to Rome to celebrate its 30 years of birth. Marie-Dominique Philippe participated in the pilgrimage and preached, and the pilgrims met Pope Benedict XVI.

== Organization ==
In 2005, the community was composed of 930 brothers, contemplative and apostolic sisters, and over 3,000 oblates in 21 countries and 91 priories, 48 of them located in France. The Family of Saint John is composed of four branches.

=== The Brothers of Saint John ===
The congregation of the brothers of Saint John is a religious institute of diocesan right (under the authority of the local catholic church) founded in 1975. It has been under the responsibility of the bishop of Autun, France, since 1986. Its mother house is in Rimont (Fley) in France. After the novitiate time and philosophical and theological studies (around 9 years in total), brothers live in apostolic priories of five or six brothers on average. Members are monks, living under the three vows of poverty, chastity and obedience. About two-thirds of them are priests. Their life revolves around prayer, studies, fraternal life and apostolic activities. They cover various missions with parishes, youths, people in need etc. The congregation is led by a general prior who is elected for a six-year period (renewable once for three years). The current general prior has been father Thomas Joachim since 2010. Their habit is composed of a grey tunic and a scapular similar to the black habit of Benedictine.

=== The Sisters of Saint John (contemplative) ===
The congregation of the Sisters of Saint John (commonly known as contemplative sisters) was founded by Marie-Dominique Philippe in 1982. It was then erected a religious institute of diocesan right by the Archbishop of Lyon in 1994, seven years after the brothers. Their mother house is located in Saint-Jodard, France, and their headquarters is in Troussures (France). The contemplative sisters' priories are inhabited by eight sisters on average. The sisters are nuns, who live a life based on prayer, community life and manual work; they live a life of total consecration to God in silence and solitude. Their habit is distinguished by its white veil. A general prior, elected for six years, leads the congregation. The current general prior has been Sister Paul-Marie Moulin since 2015.

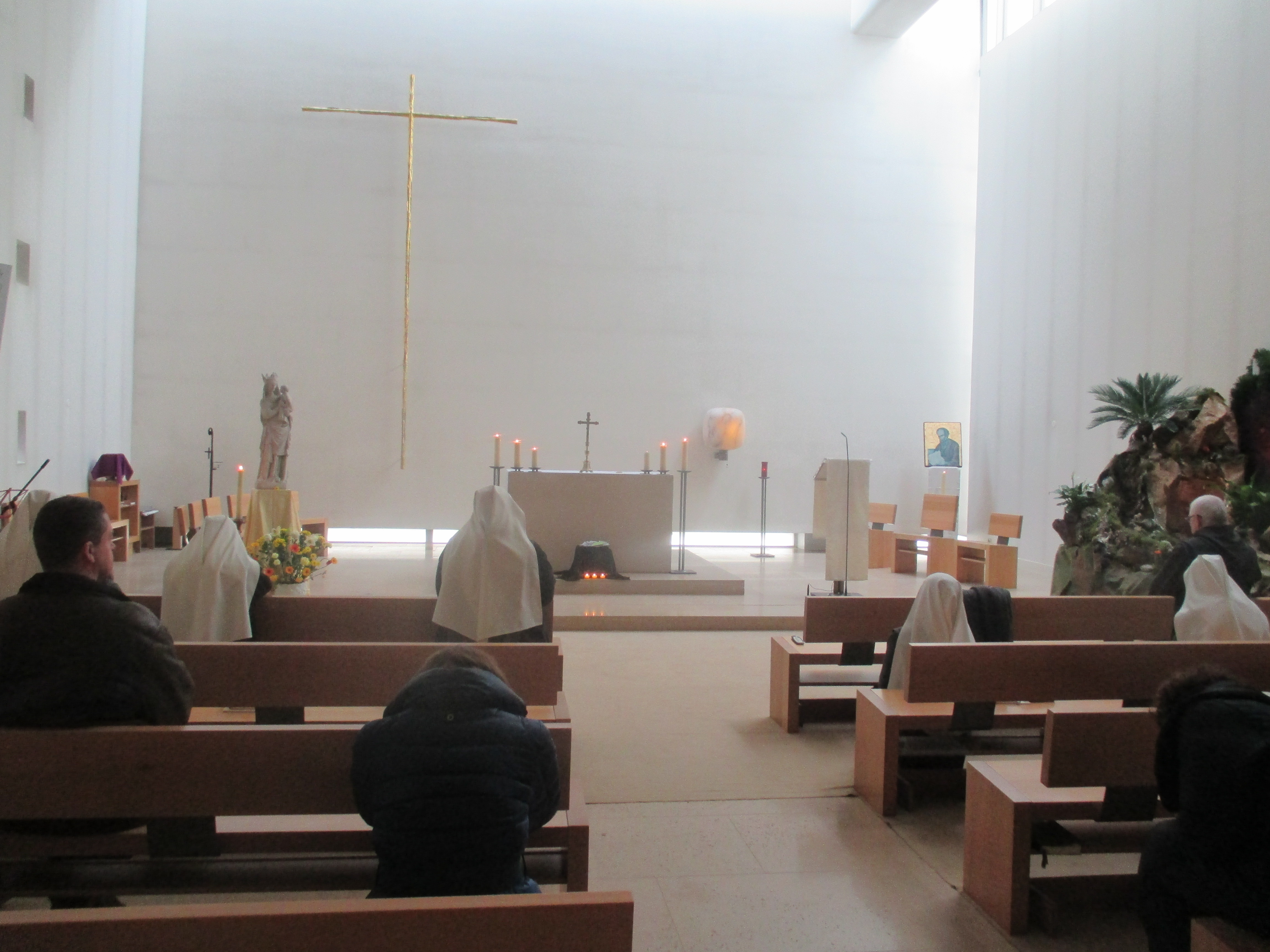
Contemplative sisters in Troussures (France).

Three years after their founder Marie-Dominique Philippe's death in 2006, his sexual abuse of nuns was revealed. A new superior was imposed by the local bishop and this led to a schism. A splinter group, composed of the majority of the Sisters of the Sisters of St John left France to refound in Bergara, Spain, and first renamed themselves the Sisters of St. John and St. Dominic in June 2012. The group was dissolved, “suppressed, effective immediately and without the possibility of being reconstituted under another form” by Pope Benedict XVI just 6 months after founding in January 2013. The reason given in the official rescript of audience signed by Cardinal Bertone was that the community had "seriously breached ecclesiastic discipline". Their second attempt to refound was under the name of the Sisters of Mary Morning Star, in August 2014, as outlined by the chronology of the Community of St John.

=== The Apostolic Sisters of Saint John ===
The congregation of the Apostolic sisters of Saint John were created in 1984. It has been recognized a religious congregation of diocesan right by the bishop of Autun, in 1993. They live an apostolic life, through evangelisation, spiritual assistance in dioceses: pension houses, schools, hospitals, prisons etc. Their way of life and charisma is close to that of the brothers, except for priesthood. The general prior is Sister Claire-de-Jésus Salvaige de Lamarge. The mother house and headquarter of the congregation is located in Semur en Brionnais, France. Their habit is composed of a grey tunic and a scapular similar to the black habit of Benedictine, with a rosary to the waist. The apostolic sisters wear a gray veil.

=== The Oblates ===
The Saint John Family also includes oblates. They are laymen, single or married, who commit to a life of prayer, close to the brothers or sisters. Each oblate is attached to a priory of the Saint John Family. They have no particular legal status: the oblates are not structured, and do not have any government institution.

== Revelations about Father Marie-Dominique Philippe ==
In 2013, the general prior of the Community of Saint John, father Thomas Joachim, officially disclosed the existence of multiple credible testimonies stating that Father Philippe had behaved unchastely (without penetrative sexual intercourse) with adult women followers. This news caused a great shock to the community and immediately halted the first steps of the beatification of Marie-Dominique Philippe. Moreover, the general chapter of the brothers adopted a motion titled "Trials and Hope" in which it admitted the existence of serious sexual abuse by senior brothers and other brothers with adults, especially their followers, and, in the past, between senior brothers and younger brothers. Fr Marie-Dominique Philippe's brother, Fr Thomas Philippe, was also found guilty of sexual abuse and psychological abuse, who founded L'Eau vive where Jean Vanier studied and was influenced (also guilty of psychological abuse and sexual abuse).

== Reaction to the sexual abuse accusations ==
Confronted with numerous cases of sexual abuse of women in the Community by the founder and other members that have become public, the Community has published a press communiqué where they admit to be "aware that their community's 45 year history is sadly marked by the sexual abuse committed by their founder – which the Prior General made public on his own initiative in 2013 – and that of other brothers in the community, as well as by errors in dealing with cases of sexual abuse in the past, notably through insufficient acknowledgment of the victims' suffering [...]".

Since the year 2013, the Community of Saint John has engaged a deep "work of truth". It deals head-on with sensitive topics such as its relationship with the founder, Marie-Dominique Philippe, or the community's own charisma.

=== Relationship with Marie-Dominique Philippe ===
After the official recognition by the community's authorities of father Philippe's breaches to chastity in 2013, the brothers of Saint John engaged in collective introspection to redefine the group's relationship with its founder. The community started a work of discernment to allow each one to "read back its personal history with father Philippe". The community wants to "work on father Philippe's teaching, and its inheritance in the thoughts and structures of the congregation, and verify its validity". Without denying its spiritual and intellectual legacy, the brothers of Saint John accepted to give up an image that had sometimes been idealized. The brothers also tried to balance their training with more external speakers, better training in psychology, on chastity and sexuality. If the thoughts and writings of father Philippe still nourish the teaching and spiritual life, the community has taken a certain critical distance and identified shortcomings in the brothers training that could have influenced moral deviances. The general prior underlines: "Father Philippe's writings have been investigated, and even in Rome, no elements were found that would be outside of the Church teaching. Eventually, what was questioned was a balance."

=== External assistance and attempts at reform ===
In 2013, with the help of a Jesuit and a psychologist, the brothers created a committee to listen to the needs of the brothers. They also implemented, with the help of Jesuit center les jésuites du Châtelard, a program to provide priors with counselling training, to help the brothers with various emotional or sexual problems. The general chapter also implemented internal procedures to submit complaints about brothers. One mandatory year of postulancy was also added before the novitiate to strengthen discernment when entering the community. In September 2015, the Congregation for Institutes of Consecrated Life and Societies of Apostolic Life appointed Mgr Blondel, emeritus bishop of Viviers, to be a pontifical commissioner to "guide" the community as a whole. Blondel clarified that his role is not to replace the existing superiors, but to help the congregation improve the state of its membership, to improve its charisma and clarify the relationship with its founder.

=== Work on the community culture ===
Beyond structures and training, the community says it is slowly shaking things up and little by little the community culture is evolving in a way that all members will accept the necessary changes. Father Thomas explains that he travelled a lot, in order for everything that had to be said to be said. Through discussion groups and support by psychologists and the Church authorities, the community is working on its own culture. If the intellectual work is already done, work on the community culture remains alive and well. In parallel with training reform, the community is a similar effort with its members. In the light of the work accomplished, many bishops in France have shown their support to the congregation. Father Thomas assures others that, from his perspective, he sees a future with hope: "One senses that, step by step, we are moving in a good direction. The risk today would be to lack a certain pride of belonging [to the community], one must also see that we have very beautiful things, we continue to bring a good news, and do good: so let us correct what needs to be, but let us also not forget the gifts God has made to our community."

== Reception ==
Since 1996, the community has been criticized in France by several anti-cult associations, including AVREF (Aide aux victimes des dérives de mouvements religieux en Europe et à leurs familles), UNADFI and CCMM. They accused the community of proselytizing among young adults, forcing them to cut all ties with their families, exerting psychological pressure, abandoning medical treatments and using training methods for newcomers too similar to those of cults.

For their part, the Prior General of the community, then Monsigneurs Madec and Poulain reject these criticisms.
