= Carlepont =

- Commune
- Carlepont Town hall
- Location of Carlepont
- Location within France Location within Hauts-de-France
- Coordinates: 49°30′54″N 3°01′32″E
- Country: France
- Region: Hauts-de-France
- Department: Oise
- Arrondissement: Compiègne
- Canton: Noyon
- Intercommunality: Pays Noyonnais

Government
  - Mayor (2020–2026): Patrice Argier
- Area^{1}: 19.54 km^{2} (7.54 sq mi)
- Elevation: 58 m (190 ft)
- Highest elevation: 151 m (495 ft)
- Lowest elevation: 38 m (125 ft)
- Population (2023): 1,393
  - Density: 71.29/km^{2} (184.6/sq mi)
- Time zone: UTC+01:00 (CET)
  - Summer (DST): UTC+02:00 (CEST)
- INSEE/Postal code: 60129 /60170
- ^{1} French Land Register data, which excludes lakes, ponds, glaciers > 1 km^{2} (0.386 sq mi or 247 acres) and river estuaries.

Carlepont (French pronunciation: [kaʁləpɔ̃]) is a commune in the Oise department in northern France.

== See also ==
- Communes of the Oise department
- Monument aux morts (Oise)
