= Troussures =

- Part of Auneuil
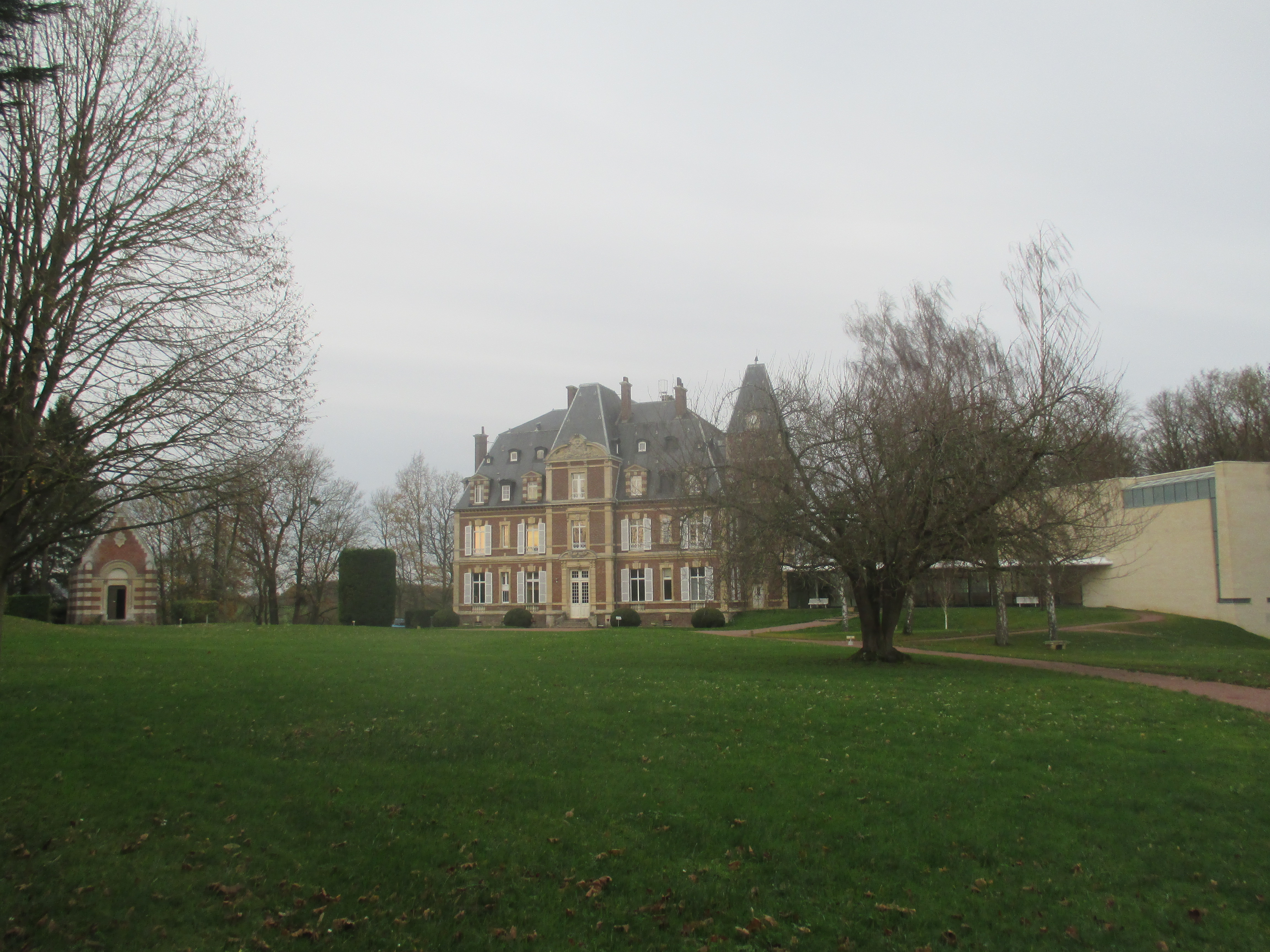
- View of Château of Troussures.
- Location of Troussures
- Location within France Location within Hauts-de-France
- Coordinates: 49°23′24″N 1°58′25″E
- Country: France
- Region: Hauts-de-France
- Department: Oise
- Arrondissement: Beauvais
- Canton: Beauvais-2
- Commune: Auneuil
- Area^{1}: 5.18 km^{2} (2.00 sq mi)
- Elevation: 130 m (430 ft)
- Highest elevation: 231 m (758 ft)
- Lowest elevation: 97 m (318 ft)
- Population (2019): 184
  - Density: 35.5/km^{2} (92.0/sq mi)
- Time zone: UTC+01:00 (CET)
  - Summer (DST): UTC+02:00 (CEST)
- Postal code: 60390
- ^{1} French Land Register data, which excludes lakes, ponds, glaciers > 1 km^{2} (0.386 sq mi or 247 acres) and river estuaries.

Troussures (French pronunciation: [tʁusyʁ]) is a former commune in the Oise department in northern France. On 1 January 2017, it was merged into the commune Auneuil. The château of Troussures shelters a priory of Community of St. John who organizes sessions and spiritual retreats.

== See also ==
- Communes of the Oise department
