= Jean-Pierre Jossua =

French writer and theologian (1930–2021)

- Born: 24 September 1930; Boulogne-Billancourt, France
- Died: 1 February 2021 (aged 90); Verneuil-sur-Avre, France
- Occupations: Writer; Theologian

Jean-Pierre Jossua (24 September 1930 – 1 February 2021) was a French writer and theologian. He was a member of the Dominican Order and spent his career writing, teaching, and researching. He was a professor of dogmatics at Saulchoir.

== Biography ==
Jossua was born into a Jewish family from Thessaloniki and had to take refuge in Nice during the German occupation. His father was deported to Auschwitz, where he died in 1943. His mother, Marcelle (née Cazes), became a translator.

After studying medicine, Jossua became a Catholic and joined the Dominican Order in 1953. He completed his theological studies at Saulchoir and defended his doctoral thesis in theology at the Faculté de théologie catholique de Strasbourg. He served as co-director of the journal Concilium from 1970 to 1996 and Director of the journal La Vie spirituelle from 1988 to 1996. In 1977, he gave Gifford Lectures on Pierre Bayle in Edinburgh. In 1992, he moved to Alpes-de-Haute-Provence near Mont Ventoux, then moved to Normandy in 2014. In 1995, he became a professor at the Centre Sèvres, working there until 2011. In 2000, he was invited to teach literature in Barcelona.

Jean-Pierre Jossua died from COVID-19 in Verneuil-sur-Avre on 1 February 2021, at the age of 90, during the COVID-19 pandemic in France. He is buried in Étiolles.

== Works ==
- Le Salut, incarnation ou mystère pascal, chez les Pères de l'Église, de Saint-Irénée à Saint-Léon le Grand (1968)
- Pierre Bayle ou l'obsession du mal (1977)
- Pour une histoire religieuse de l'expérience littéraire (1985)
- La Condition du témoin (1985)
- Le Livre des signes, Journal théologique IV (1993)
- Seul avec Dieu : l'aventure mystique (1996)
- La Chèvre du Ventoux, Journal théologique V (2001)
- Figures présentes, figures absentes : pour lire Philippe Jaccottet (2002)
- Si ton cœur croit : le chemin d'une foi (2007)
- La passion de l'infini : littérature et théologie, nouvelles recherches (2011)
- Chercher jusqu'à la fin (2012)
- Aimer Nerval (2014)
