= Appilly =

- Commune
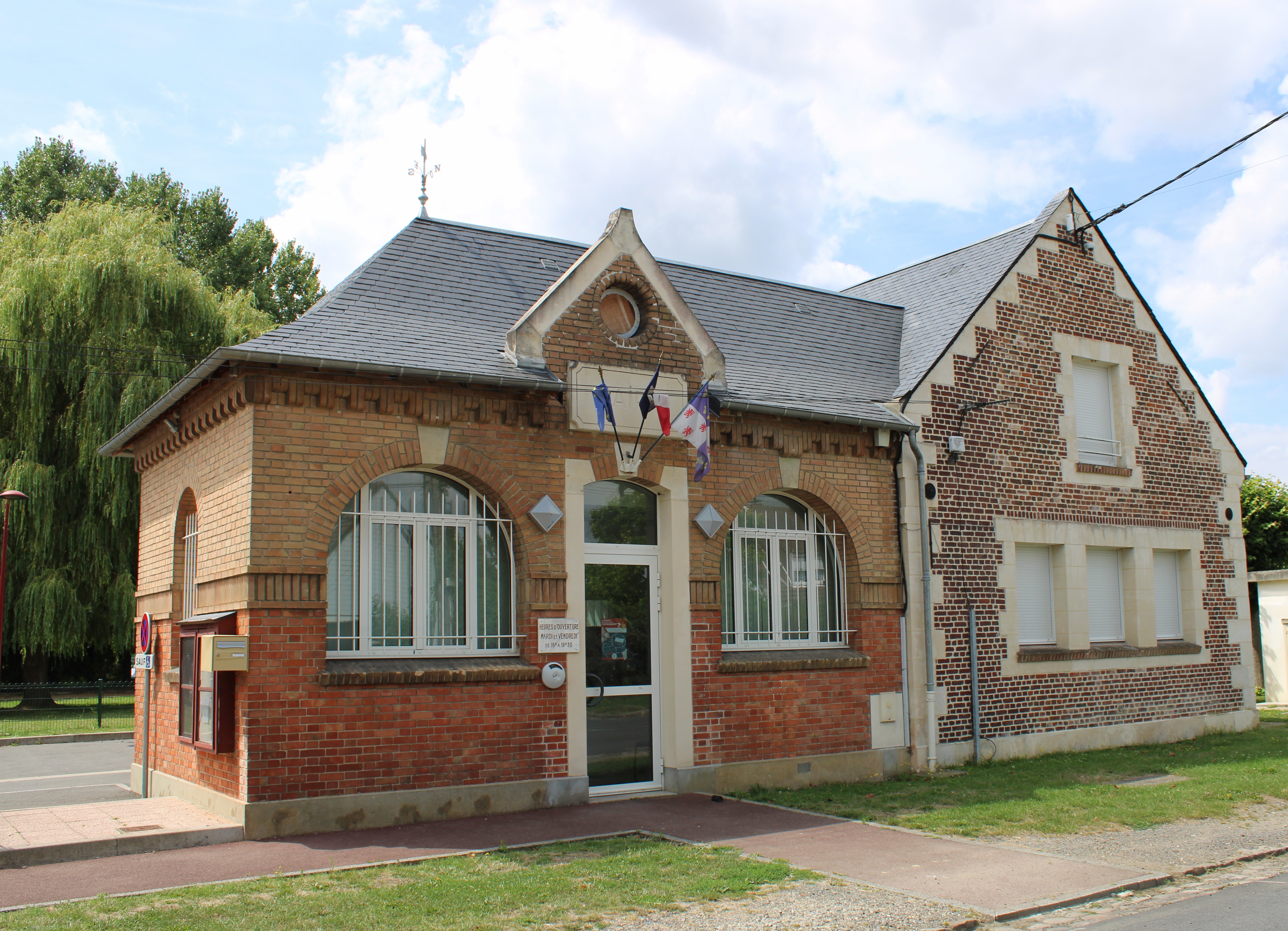
- Appilly Town hall
- Location of Appilly
- Location within France Location within Hauts-de-France
- Coordinates: 49°35′02″N 3°06′59″E
- Country: France
- Region: Hauts-de-France
- Department: Oise
- Arrondissement: Compiègne
- Canton: Noyon
- Intercommunality: Pays Noyonnais

Government
  - Mayor (2020–2026): Michel Leger
- Area^{1}: 4.57 km^{2} (1.76 sq mi)
- Highest elevation: 59 m (194 ft)
- Lowest elevation: 36 m (118 ft)
- Population (2023): 498
  - Density: 109/km^{2} (282/sq mi)
- Time zone: UTC+01:00 (CET)
  - Summer (DST): UTC+02:00 (CEST)
- INSEE/Postal code: 60021 /60400
- ^{1} French Land Register data, which excludes lakes, ponds, glaciers > 1 km^{2} (0.386 sq mi or 247 acres) and river estuaries.

Appilly is a commune in the Oise department in northern France.

== Population ==
Historical population
Year	Pop.	±% p.a.
1968	417	—
1975	582	+4.88%
1982	516	−1.70%
1990	515	−0.02%
1999	503	−0.26%
2007	504	+0.02%
2012	529	+0.97%
2017	542	+0.49%
2023	498	−1.40%
Source: INSEE

== See also ==
- Communes of the Oise department
- Monument aux morts (Oise)
