= Doris Reisinger =

German philosopher, theologian and author

- Born: Doris Wagner; 1983 (age 41–42); Ansbach, Germany
- Occupation(s): writer, theologian, philosopher

Doris Reisinger (née Wagner; b. 1983) is a German philosopher, theologian and author, and former member of a spiritual community.

== Life ==
=== Early education and joining the community ===
Reisinger was born Doris Wagner in Ansbach in 1983. She comes from a pious family and grew up in Oberkotzau. When she was 15 years old, her entire family converted from the Lutheran to the Roman Catholic Church. Even as a young woman, Reisinger became aware that she wanted to take the veil. Shortly after she got her high school diploma in Hof, Bavaria in 2003, she joined the new spiritual community (movimento) Geistliche Familie „Das Werk“ (FSO "The Work") and worked for a few years in the community house in Rome. On November 11, 2007, she made her promises (Heiliges Bündnis in den drei evangelischen Räten, "Holy Covenant in the three evangelical counsels"), in the Roman church Santa Maria in Traspontina in presence of the Archbishop of Bologna, Carlo Caffarra.

In 2008, aged 24, Reisinger alleged she was sexually assaulted by Austrian priest Hermann Geissler, a member of both "Das Werk" and the Congregation for the Doctrine of the Faith. Geissler resigned from the CDF in January 2019 but denied the accusations against him.

=== Leaving the community and activism ===
Reisinger left the community in 2011 and finished her study of theology in 2014. The same year, she published Nicht mehr ich: Die wahre Geschichte einer jungen Ordensfrau, which recounts her experiences as a victim of sexual assault within the Roman Catholic Church. Reisinger criticised that in her opinion hierarchies of many religions and faith communities, such as the Catholic Church, subordinate individuals. She claims that these communities would often provide the ideal conditions for "assault by men higher up in the ranks". A criminal investigation conducted by police in Germany and Austria against the accused did not lead to a conviction. In Germany, authorities closed the case because the priest's conduct did not meet the criteria of a crime. In Austria, the case was closed because the priest persuasively claimed that their relations had been consensual.

Reisinger started a family and became a mother. Meanwhile, Reisinger is involved in the #NunsToo movement. She scathes the pope, whose office she considers "dangerous", as he "could not be held responsible by any other person".

== Publications ==
- Nicht mehr ich: Die wahre Geschichte einer jungen Ordensfrau ("No longer me: The true story of a young woman religious") Edition a, Wien 2014, ISBN 978-3-99001-109-6
- with Klaus Mertes: Spriritueller Missbrauch in der katholischen Kirche. ("Spiritual assault in the Catholic Church") Herder, Freiburg 2019, ISBN 978-3-451-38426-4.

== See also ==
- Religieuses abusées, l'autre scandale de l'Église
