= Saint-Samson-la-Poterie =

- Commune
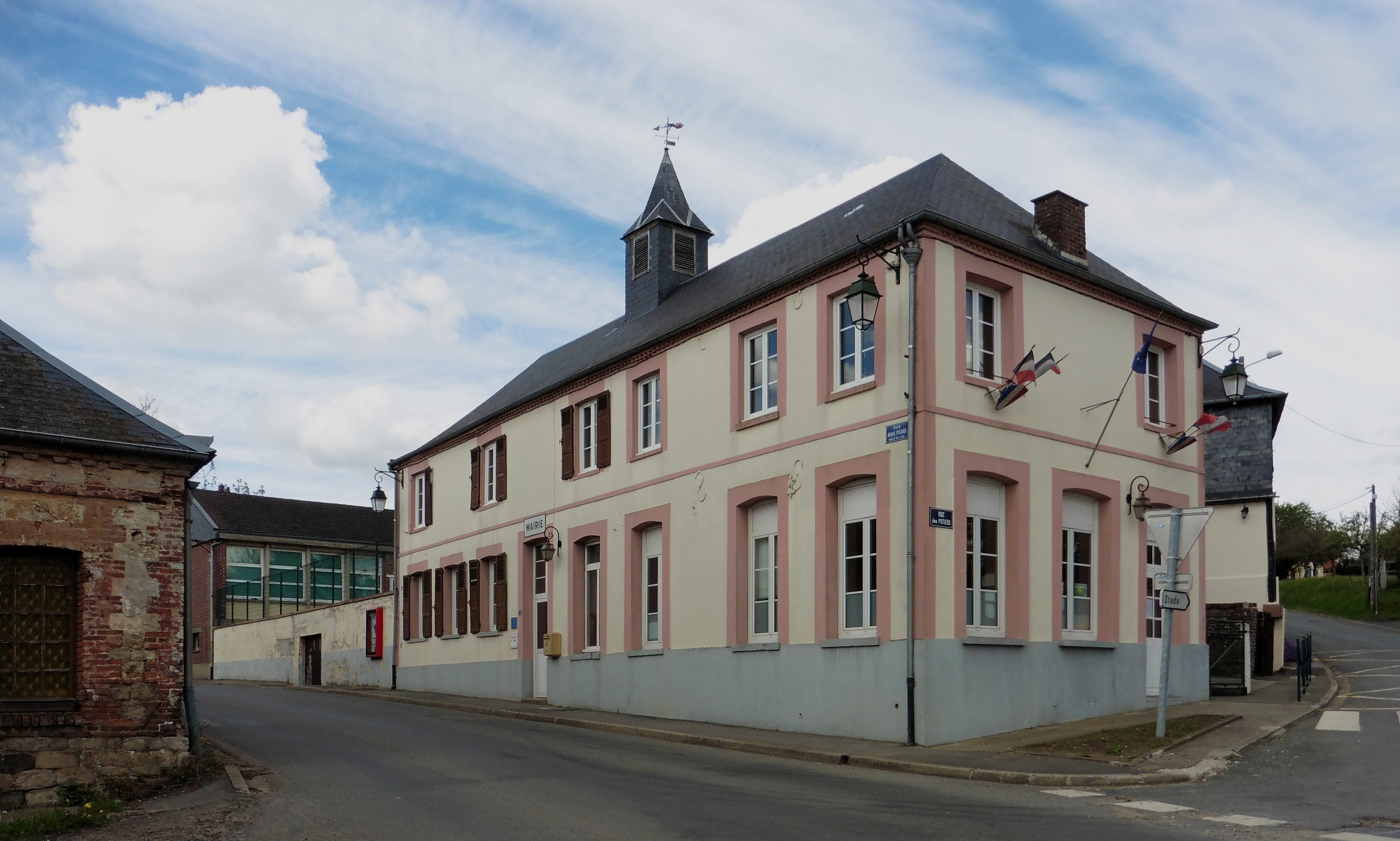
- The town hall in Saint-Samson-la-Poterie
- Location of Saint-Samson-la-Poterie
- Location within France Location within Hauts-de-France
- Coordinates: 49°35′41″N 1°44′34″E
- Country: France
- Region: Hauts-de-France
- Department: Oise
- Arrondissement: Beauvais
- Canton: Grandvilliers
- Intercommunality: Picardie Verte

Government
  - Mayor (2020–2026): Pascal Maillard
- Area^{1}: 4.3 km^{2} (1.7 sq mi)
- Elevation: 150 m (490 ft)
- Highest elevation: 214 m (702 ft)
- Lowest elevation: 145 m (476 ft)
- Population (2023): 225
  - Density: 52/km^{2} (140/sq mi)
- Time zone: UTC+01:00 (CET)
  - Summer (DST): UTC+02:00 (CEST)
- INSEE/Postal code: 60596 /60220
- ^{1} French Land Register data, which excludes lakes, ponds, glaciers > 1 km^{2} (0.386 sq mi or 247 acres) and river estuaries.

Saint-Samson-la-Poterie (French pronunciation: [sɛ̃ sɑ̃sɔ̃ la pɔtʁi]) is a commune in the Oise department in northern France.

== See also ==
- Communes of the Oise department
