= Marie-Dominique Philippe =

French philosopher and theologian (1912–2006)

The Reverend Marie-Dominique Philippe OP
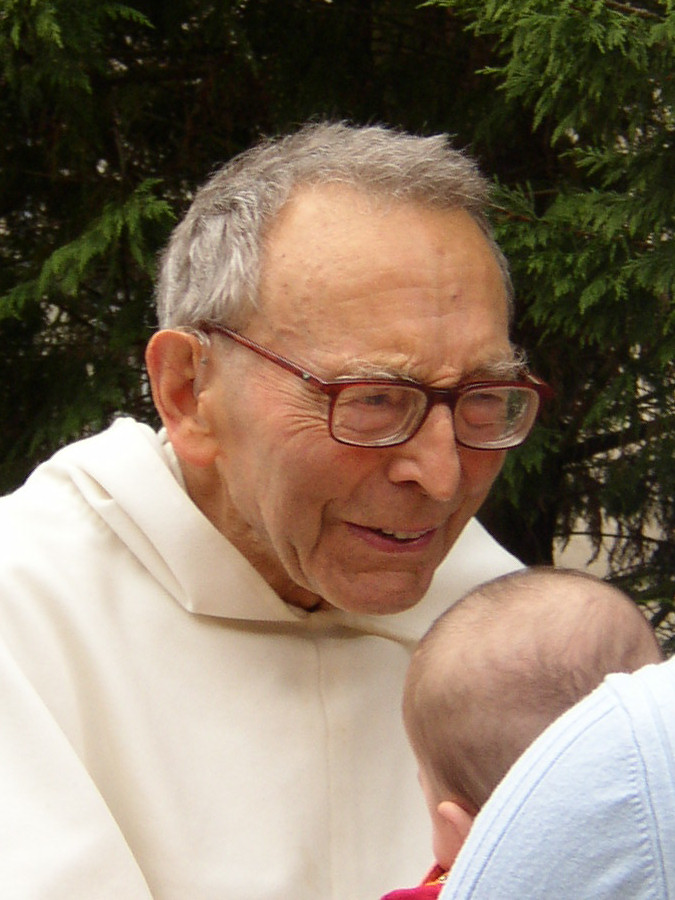
- Born: Henri Philippe; 8 September 1912; Cysoing, France
- Died: 26 August 2006 (aged 93); Saint-Jodard, France

Marie-Dominique Philippe, OP (8 September 1912 in Nord (French department) – 26 August 2006 in Loire) was a Dominican philosopher and theologian.

He was ordained in 1936. He was a professor of philosophy at the University of Fribourg from 1945 to 1982 where he held the chair of Metaphysics. Before becoming the subject of sexual allegations, he was considered one of the most important French Catholic theologians after Vatican II. While remaining a Dominican friar, he founded the Community of St. John in 1975. In 2013, the community's prior general, Br. Thomas Joachim, made known the first complaints of sexual abuse against Philippe.

== Life ==
Marie-Dominique Philippe was born on 8 September 1912 at Cysoing, France, the eighth of twelve children. From the age of six, Philippe read for his uncle, Dominican Father Peter Thomas Dehau, who was going blind. After having completed his secondary education with the Jesuits at Lille, he entered the Order of Preachers (the Dominicans) in November 1930 at Amiens. He pronounced his religious vows in November 1931, and pursued his studies in philosophy and theology at the Saulchoir in Kain (Belgium) from 1931 to 1938. He was ordained priest in July 1936. Having first graduated in philosophy ("Wisdom in Aristotle" being the subject of his lectorat dissertation) he went on to complete a doctorate in theology.

After obtaining an additional diploma of Higher Studies, he taught philosophy and theology at the Saulchoir at Étiolles (the Dominican House of Studies of the Paris Province) from 1939 to 1945 and again from 1951 to 1962, and philosophy at the University of Fribourg (Switzerland) from 1945 to 1982. From 1982 until two months before his death on 26 August 2006, he continued teaching philosophy and theology at the houses of studies of the Congregation of Saint John in France.

== Congregation of St John ==
During the summer of 1975, five students began to live a communal life. Father Philippe would visit once a week to provide "spiritual direction". The students asked Philippe for assistance in forming a religious community. The brothers initially lived at the monastery of Lerins, where they drew inspiration from Pope Paul VI's "Evangelii Nuntiandi". In 1978 they took the name "Community of Saint John". Fr. Philippe drafted a rule of life based in part on the prayer of Christ in Chapter 17 of Saint John's Gospel.

Two branches of nuns were also established, the contemplative in 1982, and the apostolic in 1984.

Father Philippe died peacefully on the morning of Saturday 26 August 2006, at the priory of Saint Jodard (France). He had been cared for there since his stroke on 20 July. He would have been 94 years old on 8 September.

== Sexual abuse ==
The Community of St. Jean admitted in 2013 that Philippe had behaved "in ways that went against chastity" with several adult women.

In June 2016, Father Philippe was accused of ongoing sexual abuse by a former Carmelite nun who received spiritual direction from him. These accusations came out as part of an investigation into similar allegations against Father Philippe's brother, Father Thomas Philippe. Following the numerous reactions, the Community has published an official statement on its website, accompanied by a chronology of the events from 2009 to 2014, in relationship with the contemplative sisters of Saint John. In 2023, the Brothers published a 826 page report detailing some of the abuse committed by members of their community, including how Father Philippe misformed the philosophy and theology of the brothers. The report confirmed the serial sexual mistreatment of nuns by many of the brothers.

== Works ==
- Mystères de Misericorde (Mary, Mystery of Mercy), 1958
- The Mystery of Joseph
- Retracing Reality, 2001
- L'être
- De L'être à Dieu
- De l'amour
- Suivre l'Agneau
- Un seul Dieu tu adoreras
- Les trois sagesses
- J'ai soif

== See also ==
- Religieuses abusées, l'autre scandale de l'Église
