= Auneuil =

- Commune
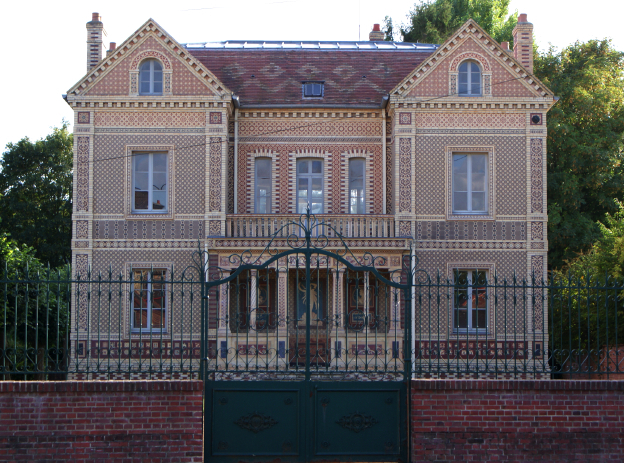
- The ceramics museum in Auneuil
- Location of Auneuil
- Location within France Location within Hauts-de-France
- Coordinates: 49°22′15″N 1°59′52″E
- Country: France
- Region: Hauts-de-France
- Department: Oise
- Arrondissement: Beauvais
- Canton: Beauvais-2
- Intercommunality: CA Beauvaisis

Government
  - Mayor (2023–2026): Johnny Carminati
- Area^{1}: 27.33 km^{2} (10.55 sq mi)
- Elevation: 129 m (423 ft)
- Highest elevation: 236 m (774 ft)
- Lowest elevation: 87 m (285 ft)
- Population (2023): 2,898
  - Density: 106.0/km^{2} (274.6/sq mi)
- Time zone: UTC+01:00 (CET)
  - Summer (DST): UTC+02:00 (CEST)
- INSEE/Postal code: 60029 /60390
- ^{1} French Land Register data, which excludes lakes, ponds, glaciers > 1 km^{2} (0.386 sq mi or 247 acres) and river estuaries.

Auneuil (French pronunciation: [onœj]) is a commune in the Oise department in northern France. On 1 January 2017, the former commune of Troussures was merged into Auneuil.

== Population ==
The population data in the table below refer to the commune of Auneuil proper, in its geography at the given years.

Historical population

Year	Pop.	±% p.a.
1793	1,033	—
1821	1,273	+0.75%
1846	1,302	+0.09%
1872	1,124	−0.56%
1901	1,444	+0.87%
1926	1,382	−0.18%
1946	1,355	−0.10%
1962	1,571	+0.93%
1968	1,679	+1.11%

Year	Pop.	±% p.a.
1975	2,106	+3.29%
1982	2,370	+1.70%
1990	2,723	+1.75%
1999	2,758	+0.14%
2007	2,760	+0.01%
2012	2,787	+0.19%
2017	2,892	+0.74%
2023	2,898	+0.03%

Source: EHESS and INSEE (2007–2023)

== See also ==
- Communes of the Oise department
