= Remy, Oise =

Remy
- Commune
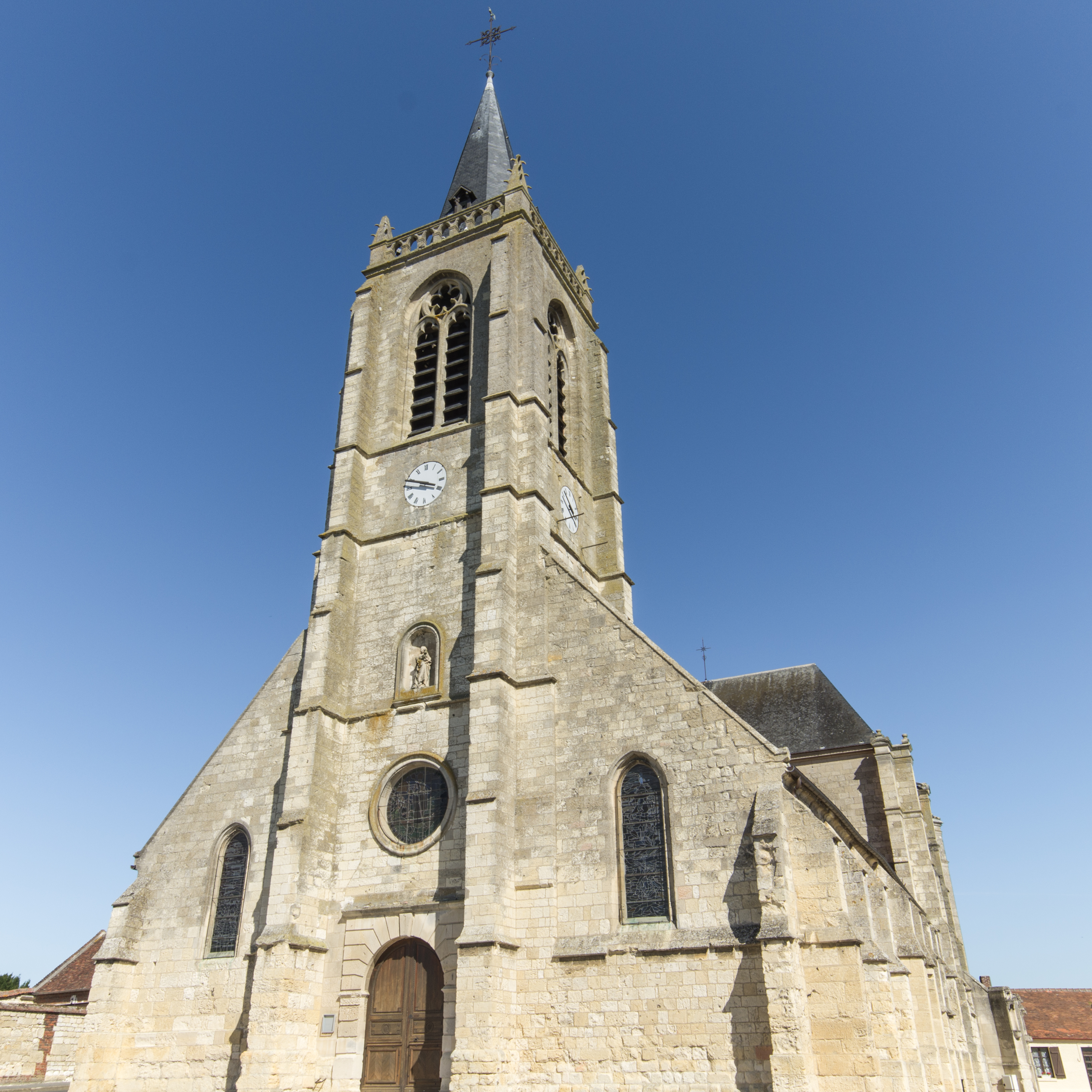
- The church in Remy

- Coat of arms
- Location of Remy
- Location within France Location within Hauts-de-France
- Coordinates: 49°26′19″N 2°42′30″E
- Country: France
- Region: Hauts-de-France
- Department: Oise
- Arrondissement: Compiègne
- Canton: Estrées-Saint-Denis
- Intercommunality: Plaine d'Estrées

Government
  - Mayor (2020–2026): Sophie Mercier
- Area^{1}: 19.97 km^{2} (7.71 sq mi)
- Elevation: 75 m (246 ft)
- Highest elevation: 100 m (330 ft)
- Lowest elevation: 47 m (154 ft)
- Population (2023): 1,928
  - Density: 96.54/km^{2} (250.0/sq mi)
- Time zone: UTC+01:00 (CET)
  - Summer (DST): UTC+02:00 (CEST)
- INSEE/Postal code: 60531 /60190
- ^{1} French Land Register data, which excludes lakes, ponds, glaciers > 1 km^{2} (0.386 sq mi or 247 acres) and river estuaries.

Remy (French pronunciation: [ʁemi]) is a commune in the Oise department in northern France.

== See also ==
- Communes of the Oise department
