= Viceregal eponyms in Canada =

In Canada, a number of sites and structures are named for governors general of the country, the Canadian monarch's representative in the country.

== Governors and Governors General of New France (1627–1760) ==
=== Samuel de Champlain ===
Samuel de Champlain (1627–1635)
Region	Geographic locations	Civil structures	Schools	Buildings
(Maine) ME (U.S. state)	Champlain Mountain in Acadia National Park			
(Ontario) ON	Champlain; Samuel de Champlain Provincial Park	Champlain Bridge, Ottawa		
(Quebec) QC	Champlain; Champlain Sea; Lake Champlain	Champlain Bridge, Montréal; HMCS Champlain; Boulevard Champlain, Quebec City; Avenue Champlain, Saint-Hyacinthe; Avenue Champlain, Shawinigan; Avenue Champlain, Rouyn-Noranda; Avenue Champlain, Pointe-Claire; Avenue Champlain, Val-d'Or; Boulevard Champlain, Candiac; Avenue Champlain, Baie-Comeau; Avenue Champlain, Mont-Joli; Avenue Champlain, Chertsey; Avenue Champlain, Disraeli; Avenue Champlain, Venise-en-Québec; Avenue Champlain, Saint-Armand; Avenue Champlain, Hemmingford; Avenue Champlain, Courcelles	Champlain College Saint-Lambert	Château Champlain, Montréal

=== Charles de Montmagny ===
Charles de Montmagny (1635–1648)
Region	Geographic locations	Civil structures	Schools	Buildings
(Quebec) QC	Montmagny			

=== Louis d'Ailleboust de Coulonge ===
Louis d'Ailleboust de Coulonge (1648–1651)
Region	Geographic locations	Civil structures	Schools	Buildings
(Quebec) QC	Coulonge River			

=== The Comte de Frontenac et de Palluau ===
Louis de Buade de Frontenac (1672–1682, 1689–1698)
Region	Geographic locations	Civil structures	Schools	Buildings
(Ontario) ON	Frontenac County		Kingston Frontenacs	Fort Frontenac, Kingston
(Quebec) QC		Rue Frontenac, Montreal, Quebec		Château Frontenac, Quebec City; Frontenac (Montreal Metro)

=== Vaudreuil family ===
Philippe de Rigaud, Marquis de Vaudreuil (1703–1725) or Pierre François de Rigaud, Marquis de Vaudreuil-Cavagnal (1755–1760)
Region	Geographic locations	Civil structures	Schools	Buildings
(New Brunswick) NB	Mount Elizabeth, named for the elder Vaudeuil's wife Louise Élisabeth de Joybert			
(Quebec) QC	Terrasse-Vaudreuil; Vaudreuil-Dorion (Note: Hamilton (1978, p. 291) identifies the elder Vaudreuil as the town's namesake.)			

=== The Marquis de Beauharnois ===
Charles de la Boische, Marquis de Beauharnois (1725–1747)
Region	Geographic locations	Civil structures	Schools	Buildings
(Quebec) QC	Beauharnois	Beauharnois Generating Station; Beauharnois Canal		

=== The Marquis de la Jonquière ===
Jacques-Pierre de Taffanel de la Jonquière, Marquis de la Jonquière (1749–1752)
Region	Geographic locations	Civil structures	Schools	Buildings
(Quebec) QC	Jonquière			
(Saskatchewan) SK				Fort La Jonquière

== Governors and Governors General of Canada (1760–1867) ==
=== Sir Jeffery Amherst ===
Jeffery Amherst, 1st Baron Amherst (1760–1763)
Region	Geographic locations	Civil structures	Schools	Buildings
(Nova Scotia) NS	Amherst			
(Ontario) ON	Amherstburg; Amherst Island; Amherstview		General Amherst High School, Amherstburg	
(Quebec) QC		Rue Amherst, Montréal (renamed Rue Atateken in 2019)		
(Nunavut) NU	Amherst Island			

=== The Lord Dorchester ===
Guy Carleton, 1st Baron Dorchester (1768–1778, 1786–1796)
Region	Geographic locations	Civil structures	Schools	Buildings
(New Brunswick) NB	Dorchester; Dorchester Island			
(Nova Scotia) NS	Guysborough County			
(Ontario) ON	Dorchester	HMCS Carleton, Ottawa	Carleton University; Sir Guy Carleton Secondary School, Ottawa	
(Prince Edward Island) PEI	Carleton; Carleton Cove; Carleton Point			
(Quebec) QC		Dorchester Square, Montréal (Note: Previously, there was also a street named when Dorchester Boulevard. The square received its name when the street was renamed Boulevard René-Lévesque.)		

=== Sir Frederick Haldimand ===
Frederick Haldimand (1778–1786)
Region	Geographic locations	Civil structures	Schools	Buildings
(Ontario) ON	Haldimand County			
(Prince Edward Island) PEI	Haldimand River			

=== Robert Prescott ===
Robert Prescott (1796–1799)
Region	Geographic locations	Civil structures	Schools	Buildings
(Ontario) ON	Prescott; Prescott and Russell United Counties			

=== Sir George Prevost ===
George Prevost (1812–1815)
Region	Geographic locations	Civil structures	Schools	Buildings
(Ontario) ON		HMS Wolfe (launched in Kingston) was called HMS Sir George Prevost before its launch in 1813.		

=== Sir Gordon Drummond ===
Gordon Drummond (1815–1816)
Region	Geographic locations	Civil structures	Schools	Buildings
(New Brunswick) NB	Drummond (Note: The town takes its name from the old Drummond Parish, which was named for the Governor General.)			
(Ontario) ON	Drummond/North Elmsley			
(Quebec) QC	Drummondville			

=== Sir John Coape Sherbrooke ===
John Coape Sherbrooke (1816–1818)
Region	Geographic locations	Civil structures	Schools	Buildings
(New Brunswick) NB		Sir John Sherbrooke, Saint John		
(Nova Scotia) NS	Sherbrooke	Sir John Sherbrooke, Halifax		
(Quebec) QC	Sherbrooke	Sherbrooke Street, Montréal		

=== The Duke of Richmond ===
Charles Lennox, 4th Duke of Richmond (1818–1819)
Region	Geographic locations	Civil structures	Schools	Buildings
(Nova Scotia) NS	Richmond County			
(Ontario) ON	Richmond; Richmond Hill			
(Quebec) QC	Lennoxville; Richmond			Fort Lennox

=== The Earl of Dalhousie ===
George Ramsay, 9th Earl of Dalhousie (1820–1828)
Region	Geographic locations	Civil structures	Schools	Buildings
(New Brunswick) NB	Dalhousie			
(Nova Scotia) NS			Dalhousie University	
(Ontario) ON	Port Dalhousie			

=== Sir James Kempt ===
James Kempt (1828–1830)
Region	Geographic locations	Civil structures	Schools	Buildings
(Nova Scotia) NS	Kempt; Kempt Head; Kempt Lake; Kempt Shore; Kemptown; Kemptville			
(Ontario) ON	Kemptville			

=== The Lord Aylmer ===
Matthew Whitworth-Aylmer, 5th Baron Aylmer (1830–1835)
Region	Geographic locations	Civil structures	Schools	Buildings
(Ontario) ON	Aylmer			
(Quebec) QC	Aylmer			

=== The Earl of Gosford ===
Archibald Acheson, 2nd Earl of Gosford (1835–1837)
Region	Geographic locations	Civil structures	Schools	Buildings
(Quebec) QC	Gosford River			

=== Sir John Colborne ===
John Colborne, 1st Baron Seaton (1837–1838)
Region	Geographic locations	Civil structures	Schools	Buildings
(Ontario) ON	Port Colborne		Seaton's House, Upper Canada College	

=== The Lord Sydenham ===
Charles Poulett Thomson, 1st Baron Sydenham (1839–1841)
Region	Geographic locations	Civil structures	Schools	Buildings
(Ontario) ON	Sydenham, Frontenac County; Sydenham, Grey County; Sydenham River; Sydenham River (Lake Huron)			

=== Sir Charles Metcalfe ===
Charles Metcalfe, 1st Baron Metcalfe (1843–1845)
Region	Geographic locations	Civil structures	Schools	Buildings
(Ontario) ON	Metcalfe	Metcalfe Street (Ottawa)		
(Quebec) QC		Metcalfe Street (Montreal)		

=== The Earl of Elgin and Kincardine ===
James Bruce, 8th Earl of Elgin (1847–1854)
Region	Geographic locations	Civil structures	Schools	Buildings
(New Brunswick) NB	Elgin; Port Elgin			
(Ontario) ON	Bruce County; Bruce Mines; Elgin; Elgin County; Kincardine; Port Elgin			

=== Sir Edmund Walker Head ===
Sir Edmund Walker Head, 8th Baronet (1854–1861)
Region	Geographic locations	Civil structures	Schools	Buildings
(New Brunswick) NB	Edmundston			

== Governors General of Canada (since 1867) ==
=== The Viscount Monck ===
Charles Monck, 4th Viscount Monck (1867–1869)
Region	Geographic locations	Civil structures	Schools	Buildings
(Ontario) ON	Monck Township, Muskoka; Monck, Wellington North	Monck Road		

=== The Lord Lisgar ===
John Young, 1st Baron Lisgar (1869–1872)
Region	Geographic locations	Civil structures	Schools	Buildings
(Ontario) ON		Lisgar GO Station, Mississauga	Lisgar Collegiate Institute, Ottawa; Lisgar Middle School, Mississauga	

=== The Earl of Dufferin ===
Frederick Hamilton-Temple-Blackwood, 1st Marquess of Dufferin and Ava (1872–1878)
Region	Geographic locations	Civil structures	Schools	Buildings
(British Columbia) BC	Countess of Dufferin Range, named for Lord Dufferin's wife Hariot, Countess of Dufferin; Dufferin Island; Dufferin, Kamloops			
(Manitoba) MB		Countess of Dufferin, named for Lord Dufferin's wife Hariot, Countess of Dufferin		
(Nova Scotia) NS	Port Dufferin			
(Ontario) ON	Dufferin County	Dufferin Street, Toronto		
(Quebec) QC		Dufferin Street, Quebec City		Terrasse Dufferin, Quebec City

=== Marquess of Lorne ===
John Campbell, 9th Duke of Argyll (1878–1883)
Region	Geographic locations	Civil structures	Schools	Buildings
(Manitoba) MB	Lorne			
(New Brunswick) NB	Lorne; Lorneville			
(Nova Scotia) NS	Lorne; Lornevale; Lorneville; Port Lorne			
(Ontario) ON	Lorne Park			
(Prince Edward Island) PEI	Lorne Valley			
(Yukon) YK	Mount Lorne			

=== The Marquess of Lansdowne ===
Henry Petty-Fitzmaurice, 5th Marquess of Lansdowne (1883–1888)
Region	Geographic locations	Civil structures	Schools	Buildings
(Alberta) AB	Lansdowne, Edmonton			
(British Columbia) BC				Lansdowne Centre, Richmond
(Manitoba) MB			Lansdowne School, Winnipeg	
(New Brunswick) NB		Lansdowne Street, Fredericton		
(Nova Scotia) NS	Lansdowne			
(Ontario) ON	Lansdowne (Note: The identity of this town's namesake is disputed. Carolyn Harris, in The Canadian Encyclopedia, identifies the Governor General as the namesake. Hamilton (1978, pp. 183–184), however, suggests that the namesake is his ancestor, the 2nd Marquess.); Lansdowne Park, Ottawa	Lansdowne Avenue, Toronto; Lansdowne station (Toronto); Lansdowne Street, Peterborough; Lansdowne Street, Sudbury	Lansdowne Public School, Sudbury; Lord Lansdowne Junior Public School, Toronto	Lansdown House
(Quebec) QC		Lansdowne Street, Quebec City		
(Yukon) YK	Lansdowne; Mount Lansdowne			

=== The Lord Stanley of Preston ===
Frederick Stanley, 16th Earl of Derby (1888–1893)
Region	Geographic locations	Civil structures and other objects	Schools	Buildings
(British Columbia) BC	Stanley Park, Vancouver; Stanley Peak (Note: The identity of this mountain's namesake is disputed. Carolyn Harris, in The Canadian Encyclopedia, identifies the Governor General as the peak's namesake. The official database for geographical names in British Columbia, however, identifies Stanley H. Mitchell, an official of the Alpine Club of Canada, as the mountain's namesake.)			
(New Brunswick) NB	Stanley (Note: The identity of this town's namesake is disputed. Carolyn Harris, in The Canadian Encyclopedia, identifies the Governor General as the town's namesake. Hamilton (1978, p. 102), however, identifies his father, who was the British Prime Minister, as the town's namesake.)			
(Nova Scotia) NS	Stanley			
(Ontario) ON	Port Stanley			
(Quebec) QC		Rue Stanley, Montréal		
		the Stanley Cup, a trophy presented to the winning team of the National Hockey League annually		

=== The Earl of Aberdeen ===
John Hamilton-Gordon, 1st Marquess of Aberdeen and Temair (1893–1898)
Region	Geographic locations	Civil structures	Schools	Buildings
(British Columbia) BC	Aberdeen, Kamloops; Aberdeen Lake; Haddo Lake			
(New Brunswick) NB	Aberdeen Parish			
(Ontario) ON		Aberdeen Street, Hamilton; Aberdeen Street, Kingston; Aberdeen Street, Sarnia; Aberdeen Street, Toronto		Aberdeen Pavilion, Ottawa
(Quebec) QC				Lady Aberdeen Bridge, in Gatineau, is named for Lord Aberdeen's wife Ishbel, Countess of Aberdeen
(Saskatchewan) SK	Aberdeen			

=== The Earl of Minto ===
Gilbert Elliot-Murray-Kynynmound, 4th Earl of Minto (1898–1904)
Region	Geographic locations	Civil structures and other objects	Schools	Buildings
(British Columbia) BC	Minto City; Mount Minto	Minto Street, Vancouver		
(Manitoba) MB	Minto			
(New Brunswick) NB	Minto			
(Ontario) ON	Minto	Minto Place, Ottawa; Minto Street, Toronto		Lady Minto Hospital, Cochrane, is named for Lord Minto's wife Mary, Countess of Minto.; Minto Skating Club, Ottawa
		the Minto Cup, a trophy presented annually to the champion junior men's lacrosse team in Canada		

=== The Earl Grey ===
Albert Grey, 4th Earl Grey (1904–1911)
Region	Geographic locations	Civil structures and other objects	Schools	Buildings
(Newfoundland and Labrador) NL	Grey River			
(Saskatchewan) SK	Earl Grey			
		the Grey Cup, a trophy presented annually to the champion of the Canadian Football League		

=== The Duke of Devonshire ===
Victor Cavendish, 9th Duke of Devonshire (1916–1921)
Region	Geographic locations	Civil structures and other objects	Schools	Buildings
(Ontario) ON			Devonshire Community Public School, Ottawa	
		Devonshire Cup, a trophy presented to the champion of the Canadian Senior Golf Association; Duke of Devonshire Trophy, awarded by the Ottawa Horticultural Society to its highest scoring exhibitor		

=== The Lord Byng of Vimy ===
Julian Byng, 1st Viscount Byng of Vimy (1921–1926)
Region	Geographic locations	Civil structures and other objects	Schools	Buildings
(Alberta) AB	Mount Byng			
(British Columbia) BC	Camp Byng, Roberts Creek; Mount Byng		Lord Byng Elementary School, Richmond; Lord Byng Secondary School, Vancouver	
(Manitoba) MB			General Byng School, Winnipeg	
(Ontario) ON		Governor General's Cup awarded at the Royal Agricultural Winter Fair in Toronto		
(Quebec) QC			Baron Byng High School, Montreal	
		the Lady Byng Memorial Trophy, presented annually to the most sportsmanlike NHL player, was donated by Lord Byng's wife Evelyn, Lady Byng of Vimy		

=== The Viscount Willingdon ===
Freeman Freeman-Thomas, 1st Marquess of Willingdon (1926–1931)
Region	Geographic locations	Civil structures and other objects	Schools	Buildings
(Alberta) AB	Willingdon			
(British Columbia) BC	Willingdon Heights, Burnaby		Willingdon Secondary School, Burnaby	
		the Willingdon Cup, presented annually to the champion of the Royal Canadian Golf Association		

=== The Earl of Bessborough ===
Vere Ponsonby, 9th Earl of Bessborough (1931–1935)
Region	Geographic locations	Civil structures	Schools	Buildings
(British Columbia) BC				Bessborough Armoury, Vancouver
(New Brunswick) NB			Bessborough School, Moncton	
(Saskatchewan) SK				Delta Bessborough, Saskatoon

=== The Lord Tweedsmuir ===
John Buchan, 1st Baron Tweedsmuir (1935–1940)
Region	Geographic locations	Civil structures	Schools	Buildings
(Alberta) AB			Strathcona-Tweedsmuir School, Okotoks	
(British Columbia) BC	Buchan Creek; Buchan Inlet; Tweedsmuir South Provincial Park; Tweedsmuir North Provincial Park and Protected Area; Tweedsmuir Peak		Lord Tweedsmuir Secondary School, Surrey	

=== The Earl of Athlone ===
Alexander Cambridge, 1st Earl of Athlone (1940–1946)
Region	Geographic locations	Civil structures	Schools	Buildings
(Alberta) AB	Athlone, Edmonton			
(Newfoundland and Labrador) NL	Athlone			
(Quebec) QC		Chemin Athlone, Mount-Royal		

=== The Viscount Alexander of Tunis ===
Harold Alexander, 1st Earl Alexander of Tunis (1946–1952)
Region	Geographic locations	Civil structures	Schools	Buildings
(Alberta) AB		Alexander Circle NW, Glenora, Edmonton		
(Manitoba) MB			École Viscount Alexander, Winnipeg	
(Ontario) ON	Viscount Alexander Park, Ottawa			

=== Vincent Massey ===
Vincent Massey (1952–1959)
Region	Geographic locations	Civil structures	Schools	Buildings
(Manitoba) MB			Institut collegial Vincent Massey Collegiate, Winnipeg	
(Ontario) ON	Vincent Massey Park, Ottawa		Vincent Massey Collegiate Institute, Etobicoke; Vincent Massey Public School, Ottawa; Massey College, University of Toronto; Vincent Massey Secondary School, Windsor	Vincent Massey Memorial Centre Ice Skating Rink, Bewdley
(Quebec) QC		Rue Vincent-Massey, Quebec City; Rue Vincent-Massey, Laval; Rue Vincent-Massey, Trois-Rivières; Rue Vincent-Massey, Beloeil; Chemin Vincent-Massey, Rawdon		
(Saskatchewan) SK	Massey Place, Saskatoon			
			the Massey Lectures, a prestigious week-long annual event	

=== Georges Vanier ===
Georges Vanier (1959–1967)
Region	Geographic locations	Civil structures and other objects	Schools	Buildings
(British Columbia) BC	Vanier Park, Vancouver		Georges P. Vanier Secondary School, Courtenay	
(Ontario) ON	Rideau-Vanier Ward, Ottawa; Vanier, a former municipality that merged into the city of Ottawa in 2001		General Vanier Intermediate School, Cornwall; École secondaire Georges-P.-Vanier, Hamilton; Georges Vanier Catholic School, Kanata; Georges Vanier Secondary School, Toronto	Place Vanier, Ottawa
(Quebec) QC	Vanier, a city that merged into Quebec City in 2002; Parc Georges-Vanier, Shawinigan	Georges-Vanier, a station on the Montreal Metro; Boulevard Georges-Vanier, Montréal; Rue Georges-Vanier, Laval; Rue Georges-Vanier, Gatineau; Rue Georges-Vanier, Saguenay; Rue Georges-Vanier, Shawinigan; Rue Georges-Vanier, Thetford Mines; Rue Georges-Vanier, Beauharnois	École secondaire Georges-Vanier, Laval; Vanier College, Montreal	Édifice Georges-Vanier, Montréal
		the Vanier Cup, a trophy awarded annually to the university football champion	Georges Vanier Scholarship	

=== Roland Michener ===
Roland Michener (1967–1974)
Region	Geographic locations	Civil structures and other objects	Schools	Buildings
(Alberta) AB	Mount Michener			
(Ontario) ON			The Michener Institute, Toronto; Roland Michener Secondary School, South Porcupine	
		the Michener Award, an annual journalism award		

=== Jules Léger ===
Jules Léger (1974–1979)
Region	Geographic locations	Civil structures	Schools	Buildings
(Ontario) ON				Jules Léger Library, Lester B. Pearson Building, Ottawa
(Quebec) QC	Lac Jules-Léger; Parc Jules-Léger, Châteauguay; Parc Jules-Léger, Saint-Anicet	Rue Jules-Léger, Montréal; Rue Jules-Léger, Gatineau; Rue Jules-Léger, Trois-Rivières; Rue Jules-Léger, Boucherville; Rue Jules-Léger, Saint-Bruno-de-Montarville		
			the Jules and Gabrielle Léger Fellowship, after Léger and his wife Gabrielle	

=== Edward Schreyer ===
Edward Schreyer (1979–1984)
Region	Geographic locations	Civil structures	Schools	Buildings
(Ontario) ON			Edward Schreyer Fellowship, University of Toronto	

=== Jeanne Sauvé ===
Jeanne Sauvé (1984–1990)
Region	Geographic locations	Civil structures and other objects	Schools	Buildings
(Manitoba) MB			Collège Jeanne-Sauvé Winnipeg	
(Quebec) QC	Bourassa-Sauvé (electoral riding) in Montreal; Parc Jeanne-Sauvé, Montréal; Parc Jeanne-Sauvé, Saint-Charles-Borromée	Jeanne Sauvé Cup, awarded to the Canadian Ringette champions; Jeanne Sauvé Fair Play Award; Jeanne Sauvé Trophy, world championship for women's field hockey; Rue Jeanne-Sauvé, Québec; Rue Jeanne-Sauvé, Sherbrooke; Rue Jeanne-Sauvé, Saint-Bruno-de-Montarville; Rue Jeanne-Sauvé, Saint-Charles-Borromée	the Sauvé Foundation, a charity dedicated to youth leadership	

=== Ray Hnatyshyn ===
Ray Hnatyshyn (1990–1995)
Region	Geographic locations	Civil structures and other objects	Schools	Buildings
		the Ramon John Hnatyshyn Cup, a trophy awarded to the winner of the Canadian International Dragon Boat Festival		

=== Roméo LeBlanc ===
Roméo LeBlanc (1995–1999)
Region	Geographic locations	Civil structures	Schools	Buildings
(New Brunswick) NB	LeBlanc Park, Memramcook		Roméo LeBlanc Scholarship, University of Moncton	Greater Moncton Roméo LeBlanc International Airport

=== Adrienne Clarkson ===
Adrienne Clarkson (1999–2005)
Region	Geographic locations	Civil structures and other objects	Schools	Buildings
(Ontario) ON			Adrienne Clarkson Elementary School, Nepean, Ottawa	
		the Clarkson Cup, a trophy awarded to the champion of the National Canadian Women's Hockey Championship		

=== Michaëlle Jean ===
Michaëlle Jean (2005–2010)
Region	Geographic locations	Civil structures and other objects	Schools	Buildings
(Ontario) ON			Michaëlle Jean Public School, Richmond Hill	
		the Michaëlle Jean tulip, a cultivar designed to Jean's specific tastes, presented to her in 2010 by Princess Margriet of the Netherlands		

=== David Johnston ===
David Johnston (2010–2016)
Region	Geographic locations	Civil structures and other objects	Schools	Buildings
(Ontario) ON		David Johnston University Cup, awarded to the champion team in U Sports men's hockey	David Johnston International Experience Awards, University of Waterloo	David Johnston Research and Technology Park, Waterloo

=== Julie Payette ===
Julie Payette (2017–2021)
Region	Geographic locations	Civil structures	Schools	Buildings
(Ontario) ON			Julie Payette Public School, Whitby, Ontario	

== Lieutenant governors ==
=== British Columbia ===
- Barnard Island and Mount Barnard – Francis Stillman Barnard
- Dewdney, Dewdney Creek, Dewdney Flats, Dewdney Island, Dewdney Peak, (Note: Named for the town) Dewdney Street (Vancouver), Dewdney Trail, Dewdney Trunk Road, and Mount Dewdney – Edgar Dewdney
- Lotbinière Island – Henri-Gustave Joly de Lotbinière
- Mount Trutch, Trutch Island, and Trutch Street (Vancouver) – Joseph Trutch
- Prior Island, Prior Lake, Prior Peak, and Prior Street (Vancouver) – Edward Gawler Prior

=== New Brunswick ===
- Beaubassin East – Michel Leneuf de la Vallière de Beaubassin (governor of Acadia)
- Campbellton – Sir Archibald Campbell
- Campobello Island – Lord William Campbell (governor of Nova Scotia)
- Carleton County – Thomas Carleton
- Menneval – Louis-Alexandre des Friches de Menneval (governor of Acadia)
- Mount Denys – Nicolas Denys (governor of Acadia)
- Mount DesBarres – Joseph Frederick Wallet Des Barres (governor of Prince Edward Island)

=== Newfoundland and Labrador ===
- Bannerman Lake, Bannerman Park (St. John's), and Bannerman River – Alexander Bannerman
- Blaketown – Henry Arthur Blake
- Byron Bay – John Byron
- Cavendish – Cavendish Boyle
- Champney's Cove and Williamsport – Ralph Champneys Williams
- Cochrane Pond – Thomas John Cochrane
- Glover Island and Glovertown – John Hawley Glover
- Hamilton Falls and Hamilton River – Charles Hamilton (now known as Churchill Falls and Churchill River)
- Mount Musgrave, Musgrave Harbour, and Musgravetown – Anthony Musgrave
- Palliser Point – Hugh Palliser
- Terrenceville – Terence O'Brien

=== Nova Scotia ===
- Belleisle – Alexandre Le Borgne de Belle-Isle (governor of Port Royal)
- CFB Cornwallis, Cornwallis River, Cornwallis Square, and Cornwallis Valley – Edward Cornwallis
- Mulgrave – George Phipps, 2nd Marquess of Normanby
- Parrsboro – John Parr
- Pereaux – François-Marie Perrot (governor of Acadia)
- Wentworth, Wentworth Creek, Wentworth Lake, and Wentworth Valley – Sir John Wentworth, 1st Baronet

=== Prince Edward Island ===
- DesBarres Point – Joseph Frederick Wallet Des Barres
- Huntley River – Henry Vere Huntley
- Murray Harbour and Murray River – James Murray (governor of Quebec)
- Tryon, Tryon Head, and Tryon River – William Tryon (governor of New York and North Carolina)

== See also ==
- List of governors general of Canada
- Royal eponyms in Canada
- List of awards named after governors general of Canada
