= List of awards named after governors general of Canada =

This is a list of awards named after governors general of Canada. It has become a tradition for governors general to establish a trophy, grant, scholarship, or other award in sport, the arts, academia, or professional fields, either during their tenure or just prior to their departure from the office. Viceregal consorts may also create awards, such as the Lady Byng Memorial Trophy, named for Evelyn Byng, Viscountess Byng of Vimy; these, however, are not included in this list.

== Awards in sports ==
Governor General	Award	Year created	Sport	Event
David Johnston	David Johnston University Cup	1963 (renamed in 2018)	Men's ice hockey	U Sports men's ice hockey Championship
Adrienne Clarkson	Clarkson Cup	2005	Women's ice hockey	Champion of the Canadian Women's Hockey League
Ray Hnatyshyn	Ramon John Hnatyshyn Cup	Unknown - 1990s	Dragon boat racing	Canadian International Dragon Boat Festival
Jeanne Sauvé	Jeanne Sauvé Trophy	Unknown	Women's field hockey	World Cup Championship in Women's Field Hockey
Jeanne Sauvé	Jeanne Sauvé Cup (Jeanne Sauvé Memorial Cup)	1984	Ringette	Championship of the National Ringette League since 1985
Jeanne Sauvé	Jeanne Sauvé Fair Play Award	Unknown	All	Fair play and non-violence in amateur sport
Roland Michener	Michener Tuna Trophy	Unknown	Sport fishing	
Roland Michener	Roland Michener Trophy	1969	Amateur Football	National Capital Football Association Championship in Ottawa, Ontario
Georges Vanier	Vanier Cup	1965	Canadian football	U Sports football championship
The Marquess of Willingdon	Willingdon Cup	1927	Men's golf	Provincial team championship of the Royal Canadian Golf Association
The Duke of Devonshire	Devonshire Cup	1918	Golf	Championship of the Canadian Seniors Golf Association
The Earl Grey	Grey Cup	1909	Canadian football	Championship of the Canadian Football League
The Earl of Minto	Minto Cup	1901	Lacrosse	Championship of the Canadian Lacrosse Association
The Lord Stanley	Stanley Cup	1893	Ice hockey	Championship of the National Hockey League
The Marquess of Lansdowne	Lansdowne Cup	1887	Yachting	Yacht race winner
The Marquess of Lorne	Lorne Cup	1879	Yachting	Yacht race winner
The Earl of Dufferin	Earl of Dufferin Cup	1872	Yachting	Yacht race winner

== Awards in arts and academia ==
Governor General	Award	Year created	Field	Organisation/recipient
Ray Hnatyshyn	Ramon John Hnatyshyn Award for Voluntarism in the Arts	1992	All arts	National Arts Centre
Ray Hnatyshyn	Ramon John Hnatyshyn Award for Law	1993	Law	Canadian Bar Association
Ray Hnatyshyn	Governor General Ramon John Hnatyshyn Education Fund	Unknown	Medicine	University Hospital Board and Foundation of Saskatoon
Jeanne Sauvé	Governor General Jeanne Sauvé Fellowship	Unknown	Canadian studies	Brazilian graduate student in Canadian studies
Jules Léger	Jules and Gabrielle Léger Fellowship	Unknown	Royal history of Canada	Canadian scholars writing on the role, function, and historical contributions of the Canadian Crown
Jules Léger	Jules Léger Scholarship	Unknown	Bilingualism	Canadian students in bilingual programs at the University of Regina
Roland Michener	Michener Award	1970	Journalism	Michener Awards Foundation
Roland Michener	Michener-Deacon Fellowship	1998	Journalism	Michener Awards Foundation
Georges Vanier	Vanier Awards for Outstanding Young Canadians	Unknown		
The Earl of Bessborough	Bessborough Trophy (later renamed Calvert Trophy)	1933	Theatre	Dominion Drama Festival's best amateur theatrical company
The Duke of Devonshire	Duke of Devonshire Trophy	1924	Horticulture	Highest scoring exhibitor in the decorative sections of the Open Classes of the Ottawa Horticultural Society

== See also ==
- List of awards presented by the governor general of Canada
- Viceregal eponyms in Canada
- Connaught Cup (disambiguation), several named after the Duke of Connaught
- Dufferin Medal
