= Norah Michener =

Canadian politician

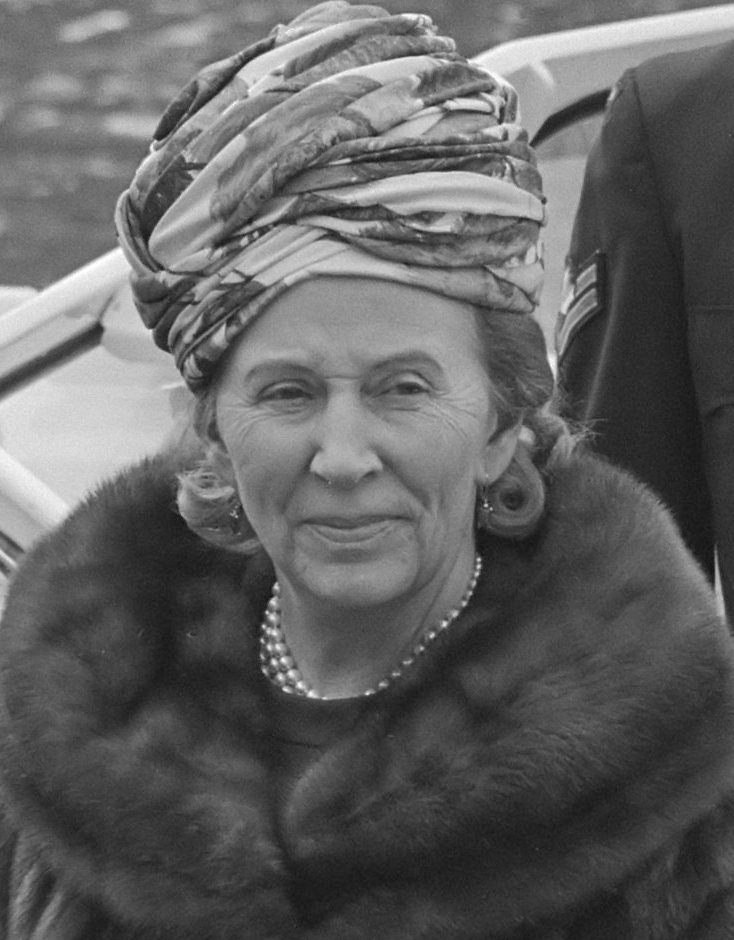
Norah Willis Michener (1971)

Norah Willis Michener CC PhD (1902 – 12 January 1987) was the Canadian wife of Roland Michener, the 20th Governor General of Canada. As the spouse of a Governor General, she held the title of Chatelaine of Rideau Hall. She had a doctorate in philosophy from the University of Toronto.

== Life and career ==
She was born in Boissevain, Manitoba, but spent the greater part of her young years in Vancouver, B.C. She attended the University of British Columbia, from which she received her B.A. in philosophy in 1922. She later considered herself fortunate to have attended the University of British Columbia, which she described as having an "intellectually cosmopolitan atmosphere and a rare tolerance in matters of race, religion and colour".

She met Roland Michener at a tea party hosted by a mutual friend, and a courtship began in 1925. On February 26, 1927, they were married. The couple had three daughters, one of whom was Dr. Diana Schatz, founder of The Michener Institute of Education at UHN.

After her marriage, she continued her studies in philosophy at the University of Toronto under George S. Brett and Fulton Anderson and at the Pontifical Institute of Mediaeval Studies under Jacques Maritain, Étienne Gilson and Anton C. Pegis. She received her M.A. in 1937 and her Ph.D. in 1953, both from the University of Toronto.

In 1955, she published Maritain on the Nature of Man in a Christian Democracy, a study of Jacques Maritain's theory of the person and his political philosophy, based on her doctoral thesis. The philosopher Leslie Armour wrote in 1999, "Norah Michener [...] wrote an important book on his [Maritain's] philosophy of human nature." In 2003, Armour wrote, "In her perceptive study, Norah Michener argues that the theory of the intellect is the key to Maritain's philosophical anthropology. 'Man can through his intellect know—and hence intentionally become—all things.'"

From 1933 onwards, Maritain gave lectures from time to time at the Pontifical Institute of Mediaeval Studies. Norah Michener attended many of Maritain's lectures, and they also met socially or in relation to her thesis. She was philosophically astute and held in esteem by both Maritain and Gilson. On the rare occasions when both men were at the University of Toronto at the same time, she made it a point to invite them to her home.

Norah Michener's dinners were memorable for the conversation as well as the food. It was her habit to propose a topic for discussion at table. In autumn 1952, the topic was Jean-Paul Sartre, who had recently given a lecture in Toronto. She invariably placed Gilson on her left and Maritain—the subject of her thesis—on her right. When, in 1956, she pseudonymously published Janet Peters' Personal Cookbook, the recipes for dessert included a gateau maritain and a gateau gilson.

An advocate of strict and proper etiquette, she published a guide to formal etiquette for the wives of federal Members of Parliament. Nevertheless, during Roland and Norah Michener's term at Rideau Hall, protocol was relaxed in a number of ways. The most notable example was the dropping of the curtsey to the Governor General and his wife, reportedly because Maryon Pearson refused to defer in this way to people she had previously known as friends.

She died at a Toronto hospital of Alzheimer's disease in 1987.

== Legacy ==
A noted philanthropist, her efforts included the creation of a wildlife preserve in the Northwest Territories which was named in her honour.

The Micheners also endowed a number of efforts in memory of their daughter Wendy, a noted Canadian journalist who died unexpectedly in 1969 at the age of 34. These included the Michener Award for public service journalism, a Wendy Michener Award presented by the Canadian Film Awards to honour outstanding artistic achievement, and an annual Wendy Michener Fund to support research in arts and humanities at York University.
