= Expo 67 opening week =

April 1967 event in Montreal, Quebec

Expo 67 was held in Montreal, Quebec, Canada. The opening week began at the end of April 1967. The official opening ceremonies for the 1967 International and Universal Exposition or Expo 67 occurred on Thursday, April 27 at the Place des Nations pavilion. On Friday, April 28, Expo 67's doors opened to the public and Al Carter was the first of over 310,000 visitors that day.

== Opening ceremonies ==
As luck would have it, it was a sunny day on Thursday afternoon, April 27, 1967, when the Official Opening Ceremonies were held. The ceremonies were held at Place des Nations, where Governor General Roland Michener – who was sworn in just 10 days earlier following the death of the previous Governor General, Georges Vanier – officially opened the fair. The Expo flame, which was lit two years earlier as part of the Centennial celebrations, was carried in by a troop of 12 cadets from the Collège militaire royal de Saint-Jean, metaphorically representing each province and territory in Canada at that time. The torch bearer was Joseph Philip Lonuel, who proceeded to pass on the torch up the hierarchy of governance: to the Commissioner General of the Fair, Pierre Dupuy; then to the Mayor of Montreal, Jean Drapeau; then to the Premier of Quebec, Daniel Johnson, Sr.; then finally to the Prime Minister of Canada, Lester B. Pearson who was the last in the chain. The Prime Minister used the torch to light the Expo flame. On hand were over 7,000 media and invited guests including 53 heads of state. Over 1000 reporters covered the event, which was broadcast in NTSC Color, live via satellite, to a worldwide audience of over 700,000,000 viewers and listeners. The Golden Centennaires, the forerunners of the Canadian Forces Snowbirds, closed the opening ceremonies with a fly-by over the Expo site and Montreal harbour.

== Open to the public ==
Expo 67 officially opened to the public on the morning of Friday, April 28, 1967. By 8:30 a.m., an overflowing crowd was packed into the main gate area of Place d'Accueil in anticipation of the opening. As an atomic clock co-ordinated the final countdown, the crowd listened to the bilingual countdown announcements over the fair's public address system. With 30 seconds to go, the crowd started participating, mostly in English, and drowned out the public address system in the final ten seconds. At precisely 9:30 a.m. EST, four and half years of lobbying and construction were over, Expo 67 opened its doors to the world.

The other entry point into the fair on April 28 was at the Île-Sainte-Hélène Montreal metro station, which itself was having its first day of service; the yellow line of the metro had opened on April 1, but Île-Sainte-Hélène station had been kept closed to the public until Expo opened. By 8:45 a.m., the metro station was overflowing with visitors and they had to be let onto the fair grounds as a public safety precaution. So, unofficially Expo 67 opened at 8:45 a.m. due to the much better than anticipated crowds.

An estimated crowd of between 310,000 and 335,000 visitors showed up for opening day, as opposed to only 200,000 people the authorities expected. The first person through the Expo main gates at Place d'Accueil was Al Carter, a 41-year-old jazz drummer from Chicago, who as Pierre Berton describes:

[Carter] already had a reputation as "the first man at world's fairs." Four years earlier he had written to Jean Drapeau about Expo, but failed to get an answer. That didn't dismay him. He began to bombard expo officials with requests for the No. 1 ticket to the fair. "If Expo ever issues a certificate for the most persistent and tenacious visitor to the fair," Expo's admissions sales manager, J.P. Lussier, wrote to him, "the name of Al Carter would be inscribed in gold."

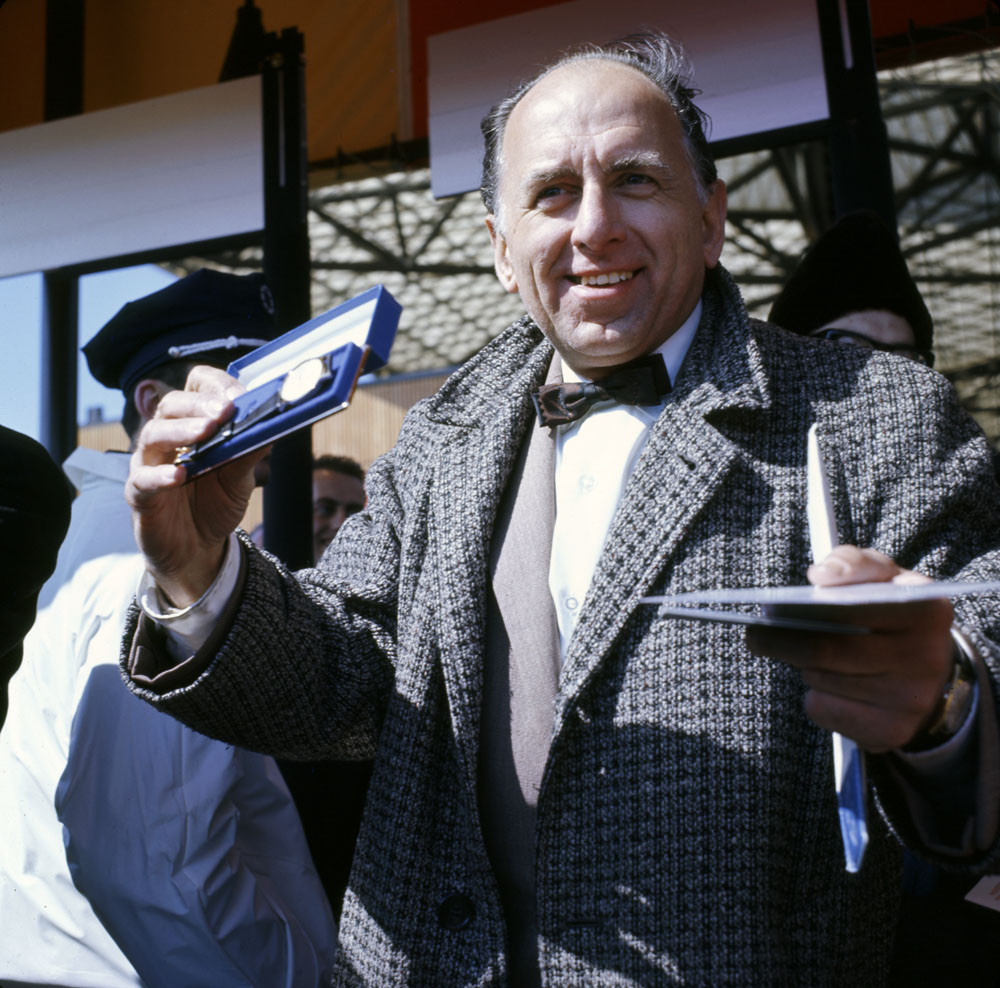
Al Carter pictured with his first ticket and a gold watch at Expo 67

Carter was able to buy ticket 00001 for a seven-day Expo passport and get the assistant area manager of the main gate, Richard J. Kaufman to write "This gentleman was waiting at Place d'Accueil this morning at 9:30 for the general public opening. To our knowledge this man is the first in line at Expo." The night before the opening, he joined the preliminary queue with a group of 25 other people and they allowed him to proceed to the front of the line. Carter received a gold watch from Expo 67's director of operations Philippe de Gaspé Beaubien, who was very impressed with his achievement.

On opening day, there was considerable comment regarding the UK Pavilion hostesses' uniforms. The dresses had been designed to the then new minidress style, which had been introduced in the previous year by Mary Quant. By the middle of the summer, nearly every other pavilion had raised the hem of the uniforms of their hostesses. Canadian women were quick to take to the liberated style of the mini skirt.

== Record crowds ==
In the first three days alone, over a million visitors attended the fair. On Sunday, April 30, Expo 67 had its busiest day of the entire fair: 569,500 people strolled through its gates, setting an all-time, single-day attendance record for World's Fairs, that still stands as of 2007. Attendance figures were significantly more than originally anticipated by the Stamford Research Institute, an American firm hired in 1963 by the Expo Corporation to be its foreign-based advisors. The institute predicted back in the initial planning stages, that only 12 million people would attend for the entire six months that it was open. In actuality, almost that many visitors attended in its first month. This was the same institute that ran a computer analysis that claimed Expo could not be built in time. Like the computer analysis before it, the report was ignored by the Expo corporation, which then promptly fired the institute and did their own attendance forecasts in 1964 that were also low, but closer to reality. Expo 67 would go on to have over 50 million visitors by October 29, 1967, making it the third best ever attended World's Fair of the 20th century.

== See also ==
- World's fair
- List of world's fairs
- 1967 in Canada
