= Ottawa Horticultural Society =

- Logo of the Ottawa Horticultural Society
- Abbreviation: OHS
- Formation: 1892
- Type: Horticultural Organization based in Canada
- Legal status: active
- Headquarters: Ottawa, Ontario, Canada
- Region served: Canada
- Official language: English, French
- Website: Ottawa Horticultural Society

The Ottawa Horticultural Society was founded in 1892. It is a non-profit organization that exists to promote gardening and horticulture in Ottawa. This is done through a series of presentations, flower shows and workshops. The Society also carries out community beautification projects in Ottawa.

== The origins of the Ottawa Horticultural Society 1854-1859 ==
The roots of the OHS reach back to the time just before the city of Ottawa was incorporated. The first OHS was organized during a meeting held on March 9, 1854, and chaired by Mayor Friel at the town hall. Thomas McKay (1792–1855) was nominated as the first President. (He declined.) The Society was primarily involved in holding shows and it did so from its founding until 1859, when it appears that a declining number of exhibitors and volunteers to work on the shows led to the society becoming dormant.

== Royal Horticultural Society of Ottawa 1862-1866 ==
The Royal Horticultural Society of Ottawa was organized in 1862 by members from the previous society. The Society functioned until at least 1866. Although this has not been confirmed, the Society may have merged with the Ottawa Agricultural Society for a few years.

== Valley of Ottawa Horticultural Society 1872-1882 ==
The Valley of Ottawa Horticultural Society was organized in 1872 by members from the previous Royal Horticultural Society. The Society functioned until at least 1882. Some members of this Society later served in the present Society.

== The founding of the present Society ==
In the autumn of 1892 a group of leading citizens and senior civil servants met at the City Hall to plan the launch of a local Horticultural Society. Their purpose was to create a society that would give instruction in the growing of fruits, vegetables, and flowers, and provide suitable conditions for exhibits of the produce of members’ gardens in due and proper season.

The inaugural meeting was on January 17, 1893, with "some thirty gentlemen present" to listen to a lecture on the newest and best horticulture techniques. Society fees were set at one dollar.

The first meetings of the Society were mainly instructional, showing members how to garden. For instance, in July 1893 members heard a lecture on strawberries, followed by a panel discussion.

== The activities of the Ottawa Horticultural Society over its history ==
The Society staged exhibits by well-known local amateur gardeners of the day such as R. B. Whyte. The Dominion Horticulturist for Canada, Dr. W. T. Macoun, was an active supporter as well as serving as President of the Society for one year. Dr. Macoun would bring new plants and display them for information to gardeners.

In 1897 Lord Aberdeen, then Governor General of Canada, took an active interest in the Society and became the first Honorary Patron. Many of Canada's Governors General have been Patrons of the OHS.

The Society began immediately to cultivate knowledge of horticulture in Ottawa. In 1893 it published a pamphlet that listed the best annuals, perennials, and vegetables for the Ottawa region. It published pamphlets describing how to grow flowers and vegetables; it distributed seeds and offered substantial prizes. By 1903 junior gardeners were receiving special attention. Geranium slips were given to the juniors with prizes for the best shaped plants and the most flowers. In 1916 the book "Ottawa, A City of Gardens" was published for the society by R.B. Whyte.

The early members also aimed at the beautification of Ottawa and, working without a city Parks and Recreation Department, undertook many projects that would now be considered the responsibility of local government. One major project undertaken with the Parks Commission before the turn of the 20th century was the planning of plantings for the west bank of the Rideau Canal. The canal was then nothing more than a ditch with a beaten tow-path alongside, as the masonry walls had not yet been built, except at the locks. Beautification of the canal banks was an important improvement for the city.

During the First World War the Society formed a Vacant Lot Association. It developed many wartime gardens, provided seeds, plants, labour (if needed), and instructional lectures to demonstrate how to "Grow Food and Help Win the War". After the war the Society re-focused on its beautification projects.

The Great Depression of the 1930s saw the Society assisting in the "Relief Gardens for the Unemployed". Fostered by necessity, home gardens and public allotments achieved great importance.

During World War II OHS members procured public lands, paid for ploughing and tools, and provided "know-how" for what were known as "Victory Gardens".

The Society presented the first official street tree policy to Ottawa city politicians and did much to promote the adoption of the trillium as the floral emblem of Ontario. Two OHS members helped found the Ontario Horticultural Association in 1906.

Today the OHS continues to present an annual series of lectures and flower shows. It also publishes a newsletter for its members and carries out community beautification projects.

== List of Patrons of the Ottawa Horticultural Society ==
The Marquess of Lorne and Princess Louise
The Earl of Aberdeen
The Earl and Lady Minto
The Earl and Lady Grey
Field Marshal the Duke of Connaught
The Duke of Devonshire, K.G.
Lord Byng of Vimy and Lady Byng
The Viscount and Viscountess Willingdon
The Earl of Bessborough and Lady Bessborough
The Governor General and Lady Tweedsmuir
Lady Tweedsmuir
The Princess Alice
The Governor General and Viscountess Alexander of Tunis
Vincent Massey
The Governor General and Lady Vanier
Roland Michener
Jules Léger
Edward Schreyer
Jeanne Sauvé
Raymon Hnatyshyn
Roméo LeBlanc
Adrienne Clarkson and John Ralston Saul
Michaëlle Jean
David Johnston and Sharon Johnston
Source: The Story of the Ottawa Horticultural Society by Frederick Pain and the yearbooks of the Ottawa Horticultural Society.
