= Lady Byng Memorial Trophy =

Ice hockey award

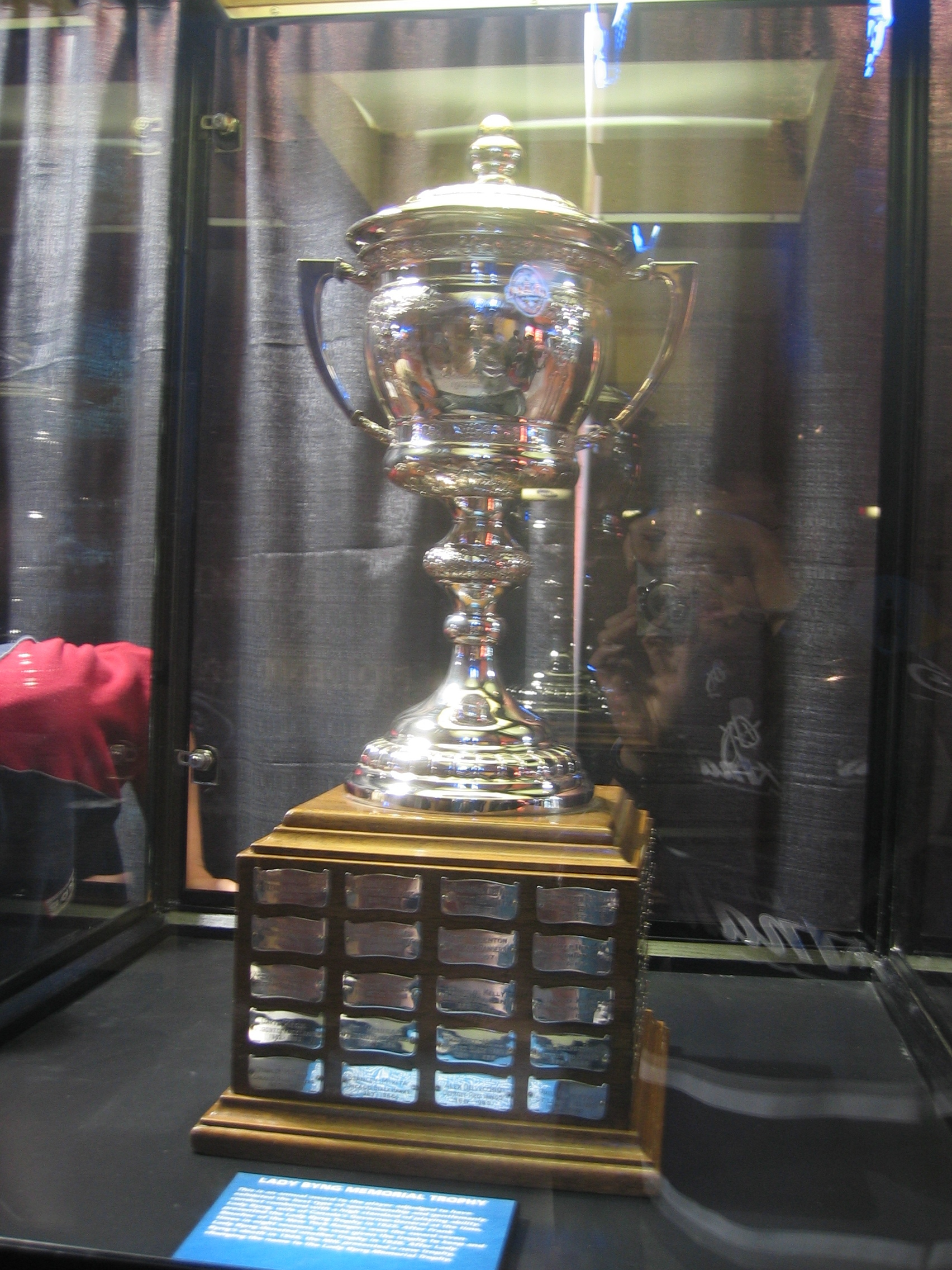
- Sport: Ice hockey
- Awarded for: player adjudged to have exhibited the best type of sportsmanship and gentlemanly conduct combined with a high standard of playing ability

History
- First award: 1924–25 NHL season
- First winner: Frank Nighbor
- Most wins: Frank Boucher (7)
- Most recent: Cole Caufield; Montreal Canadiens

The Lady Byng Memorial Trophy, formerly known as the Lady Byng Trophy, is presented each year to the National Hockey League "player adjudged to have exhibited the best type of sportsmanship and gentlemanly conduct combined with a high standard of playing ability." The Lady Byng Memorial Trophy has been awarded 90 times to 53 different players since it was first awarded in 1925. The original trophy was donated to the league by Lady Byng of Vimy, then–viceregal consort of Canada.

The voting is conducted at the end of the regular season by members of the Professional Hockey Writers' Association, and each individual voter ranks their top five candidates on a 10–7–5–3–1 points system. Three finalists are named and the trophy is awarded at the NHL Awards ceremony after the Stanley Cup Playoffs.

== History ==
The trophy is named in honour of Marie Evelyn Moreton (Lady Byng), wife of the Viscount Byng of Vimy, who commanded Canadian forces at the Battle of Vimy Ridge and who was Governor General of Canada from 1921 to 1926. Lady Byng, an avid hockey fan, decided to donate the trophy to the NHL in 1924–25.

Lady Byng decided the trophy's first winner would be Frank Nighbor of the original Ottawa Senators. Late in the season, she invited Nighbor to Rideau Hall, showed him the trophy, and asked him if the NHL would accept it as an award for its most gentlemanly player. When Nighbor said he thought it would, Lady Byng, much to Nighbor's surprise, awarded him the trophy.

After Frank Boucher of the New York Rangers won the award seven times within eight years, Lady Byng was so impressed that she gave him the original trophy to keep. She then donated a second trophy in 1935–36. When Lady Byng died in 1949, the NHL presented another trophy and changed the official name to the Lady Byng Memorial Trophy. In 1962, the original trophy was destroyed in a fire at Boucher's home.

== Award winners ==
Besides Boucher, a number of players have won the award multiple times, including Wayne Gretzky who won it five times, Red Kelly and Pavel Datsyuk with four wins, and Bobby Bauer, Alex Delvecchio, Mike Bossy, Martin St. Louis, Ron Francis, and Anže Kopitar with three each. Because of Boucher's seven wins, the New York Rangers join Detroit as the only two clubs who have won the award fourteen times, followed by Toronto with nine wins, Chicago and Boston tied with eight, and Los Angeles with seven. Adam Oates was a six-time finalist for the Lady Byng Trophy but never won.

Five players have won both the Lady Byng Trophy and the Hart Memorial Trophy as league MVP in the same season: Buddy O'Connor (1947–48), Bobby Hull (1964–65), Stan Mikita (1966–67 and 1967–68), Wayne Gretzky (1979–80) and Joe Sakic (2000–01). Mikita is also the only player to win the Hart, Art Ross, and Lady Byng trophies in the same season, doing so consecutively in the 1966–67 and 1967–68 seasons. Gretzky, Bobby Hull, and Martin St. Louis also won these three awards, but not in the same season. Bobby and Brett Hull are the only father–son combination to win the Hart and Lady Byng trophies.

Bill Quackenbush, Jaccob Slavin, Red Kelly, and Brian Campbell are the only defensemen to have won the Lady Byng Trophy, with Kelly and Slavin being the only ones to win it multiple times. Kelly holds a record three as a defenseman (four overall). After Kelly, no defenseman won the award for a 58-year stretch, which ended in 2012 when Campbell received the honor, although Nicklas Lidstrom narrowly lost to Joe Sakic in 2001. No goaltender has ever won the award.

=== List of winners ===
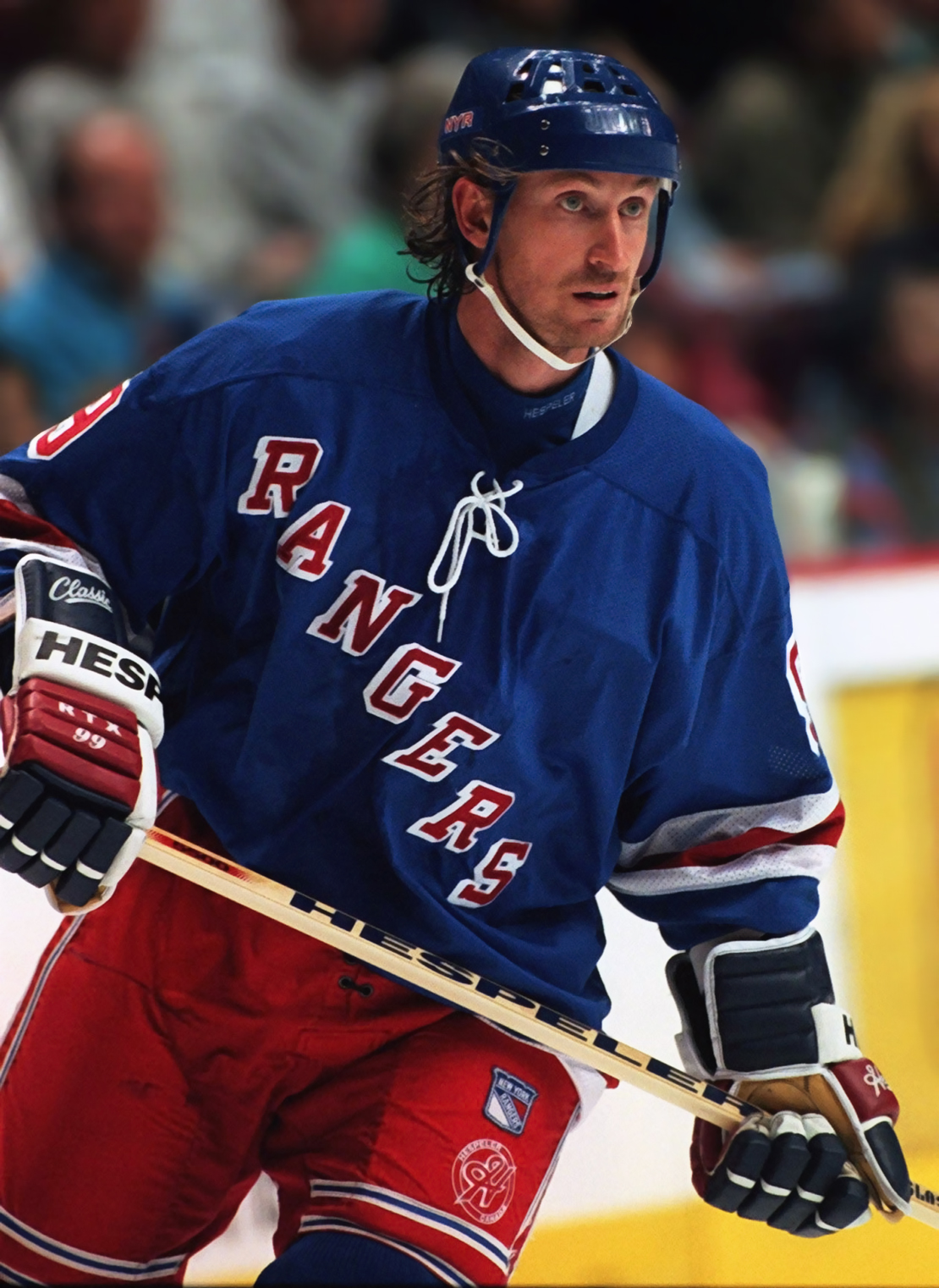
Wayne Gretzky, five-time winner

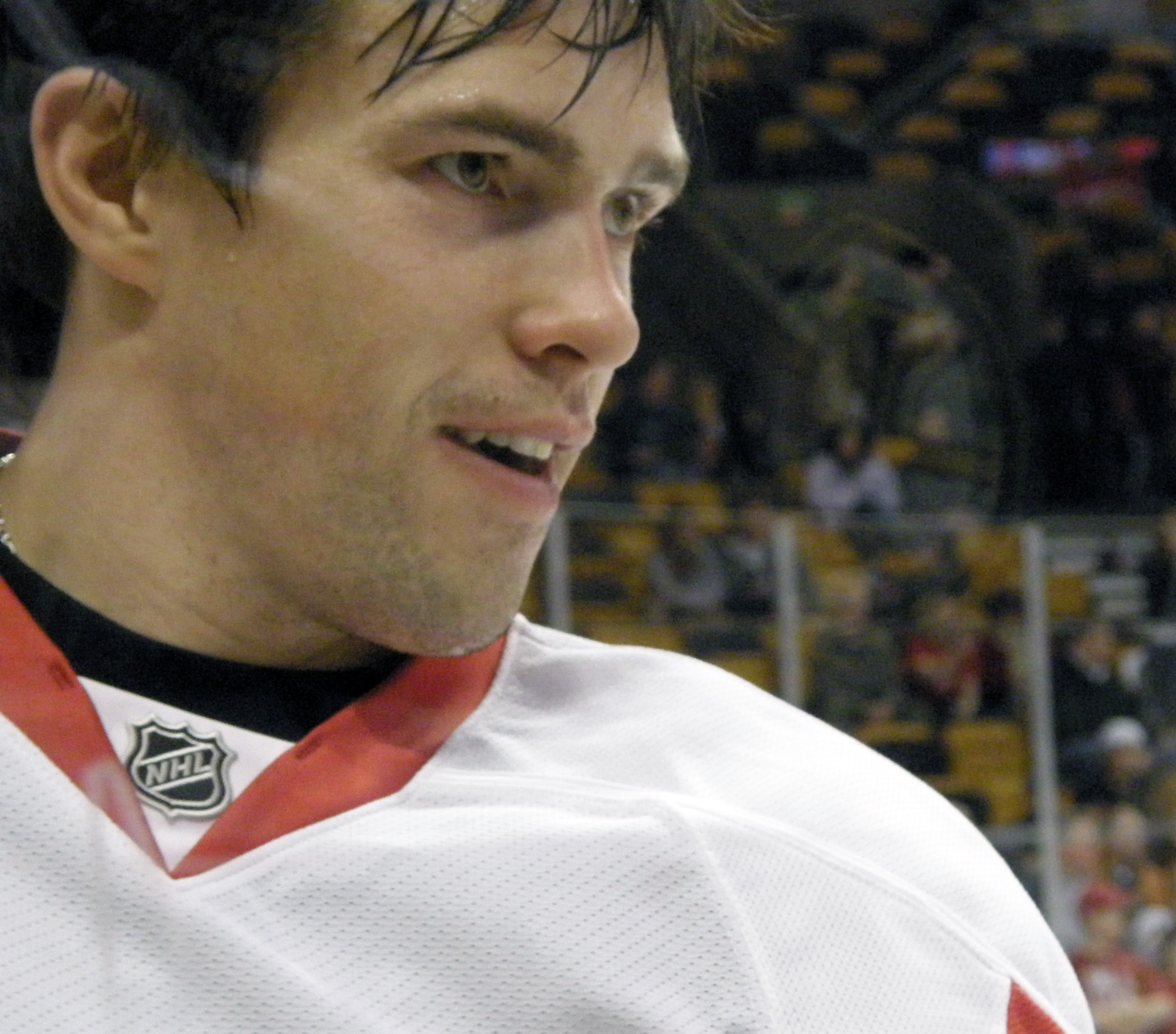
Pavel Datsyuk, four-time winner

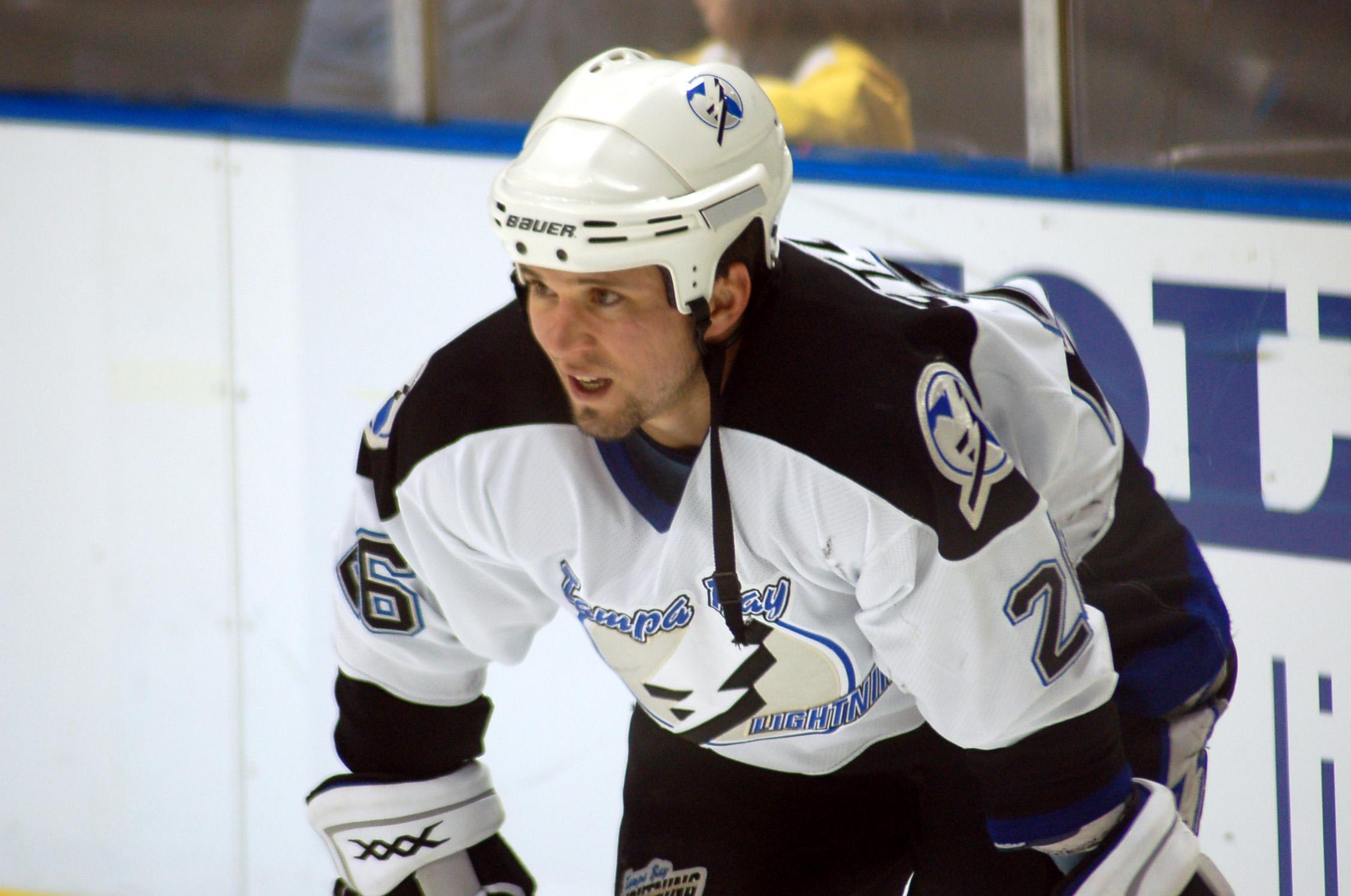
Martin St. Louis, three-time winner

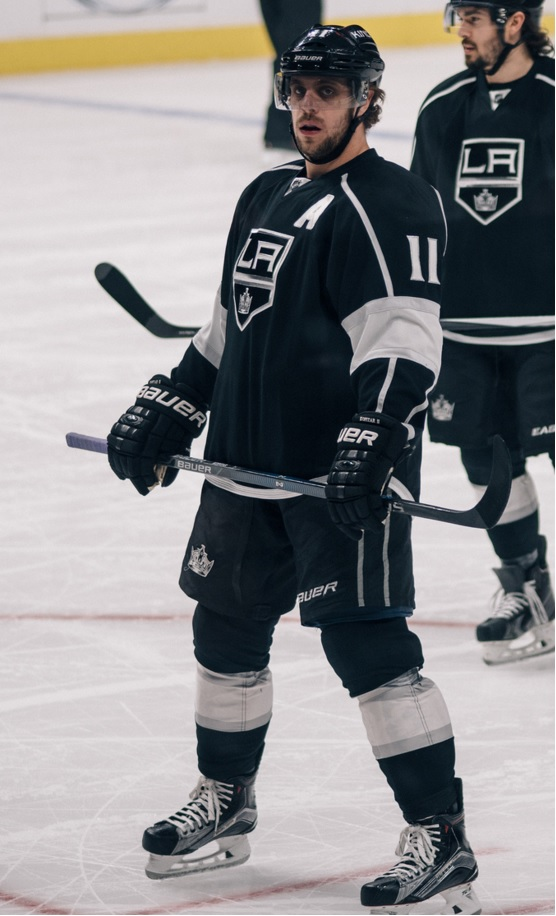
Anze Kopitar, three-time winner

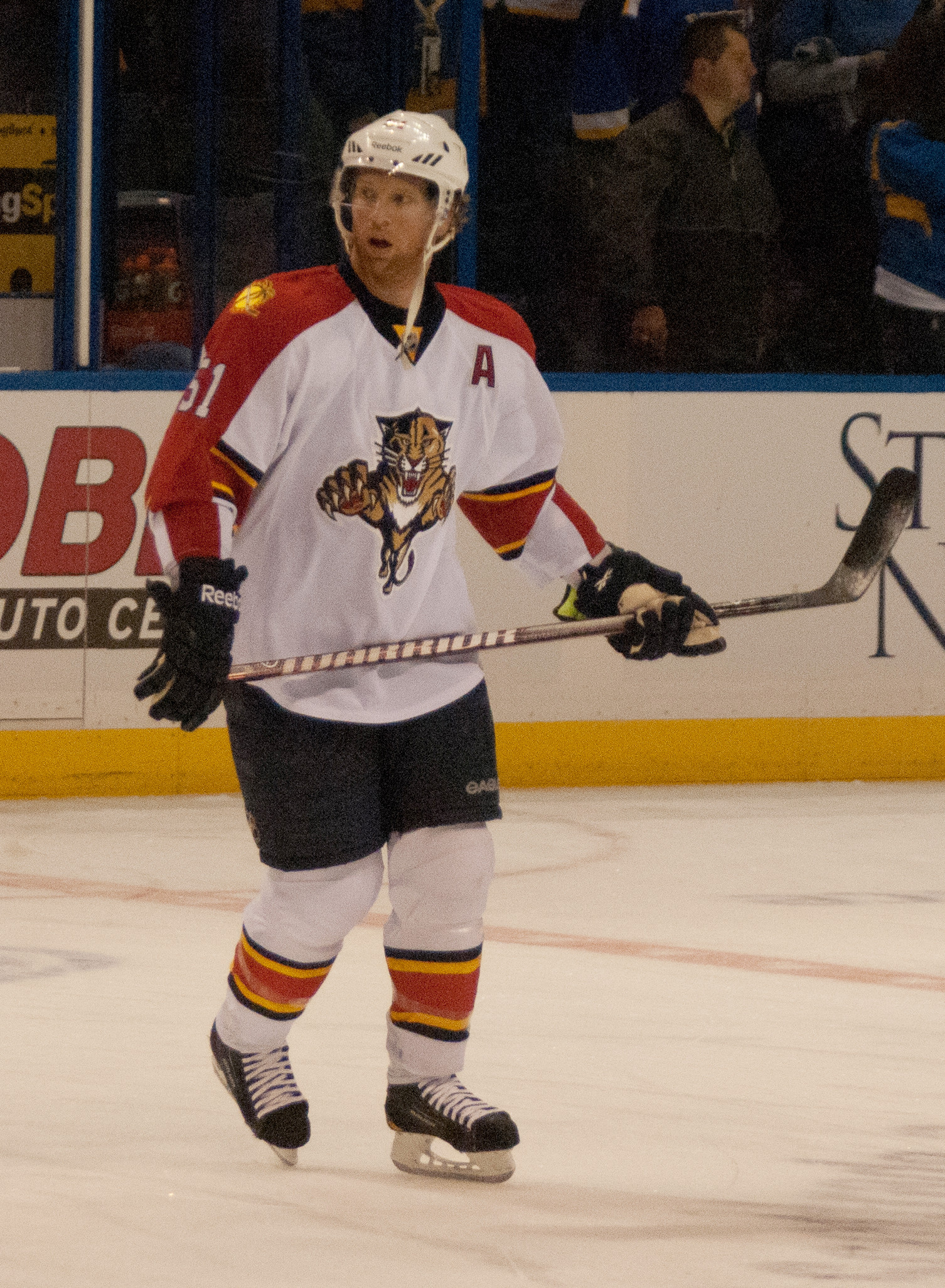
Brian Campbell, one-time winner

Positions key
C	Centre
RW	Right wing
LW	Left wing
D	Defence
G	Goaltender

^ Player is still active
† Player's team won the Stanley Cup
* Player elected to the Hockey Hall of Fame
~ Player not yet eligible for the Hockey Hall of Fame

Season	Winner	Team	Position	Win #	GP	PIM	Avg
1924–25	Frank Nighbor*	Ottawa Senators	C	1	26	18	0.69
1925–26	Frank Nighbor*	Ottawa Senators	C	2	35	40	1.14
1926–27	Billy Burch*	New York Americans	C	1	43	40	0.93
1927–28	Frank Boucher*	New York Rangers†	C	1	44	15	0.34
1928–29	Frank Boucher*	New York Rangers	C	2	44	8	0.18
1929–30	Frank Boucher*	New York Rangers	C	3	42	16	0.38
1930–31	Frank Boucher*	New York Rangers	C	4	44	20	0.46
1931–32	Joe Primeau*	Toronto Maple Leafs†	C	1	45	25	0.56
1932–33	Frank Boucher*	New York Rangers†	C	5	46	4	0.09
1933–34	Frank Boucher*	New York Rangers	C	6	48	4	0.08
1934–35	Frank Boucher*	New York Rangers	C	7	48	2	0.04
1935–36	Elwin "Doc" Romnes	Chicago Black Hawks	C	1	48	6	0.13
1936–37	Marty Barry*	Detroit Red Wings†	C	1	47	6	0.13
1937–38	Gordie Drillon*	Toronto Maple Leafs	RW	1	48	4	0.08
1938–39	Clint Smith*	New York Rangers	C	1	48	2	0.04
1939–40	Bobby Bauer*	Boston Bruins	RW	1	48	2	0.04
1940–41	Bobby Bauer*	Boston Bruins†	RW	2	48	2	0.04
1941–42	Syl Apps*	Toronto Maple Leafs†	C	1	38	0	0.00
1942–43	Max Bentley*	Chicago Black Hawks	C	1	47	2	0.04
1943–44	Clint Smith*	Chicago Black Hawks	C	2	50	4	0.08
1944–45	Bill Mosienko*	Chicago Black Hawks	RW	1	50	0	0.00
1945–46	Toe Blake*	Montreal Canadiens†	LW	1	50	2	0.04
1946–47	Bobby Bauer*	Boston Bruins	RW	3	58	4	0.07
1947–48	Buddy O'Connor*	New York Rangers	C	1	60	8	0.13
1948–49	Bill Quackenbush*	Detroit Red Wings	D	1	60	0	0.00
1949–50	Edgar Laprade*	New York Rangers	C	1	60	2	0.03
1950–51	Red Kelly*	Detroit Red Wings	D	1	70	24	0.34
1951–52	Sid Smith	Toronto Maple Leafs	LW	1	70	6	0.09
1952–53	Red Kelly*	Detroit Red Wings	D	2	70	8	0.11
1953–54	Red Kelly*	Detroit Red Wings†	D	3	62	18	0.29
1954–55	Sid Smith	Toronto Maple Leafs	LW	2	70	14	0.20
1955–56	Earl Reibel	Detroit Red Wings	C	1	68	10	0.15
1956–57	Andy Hebenton	New York Rangers	RW	1	70	10	0.14
1957–58	Camille Henry	New York Rangers	LW	1	70	2	0.03
1958–59	Alex Delvecchio*	Detroit Red Wings	LW	1	70	6	0.09
1959–60	Don McKenney	Boston Bruins	C	1	70	28	0.40
1960–61	Red Kelly*	Toronto Maple Leafs	C	4	64	12	0.19
1961–62	Dave Keon*	Toronto Maple Leafs†	C	1	64	2	0.03
1962–63	Dave Keon*	Toronto Maple Leafs†	C	2	68	2	0.03
1963–64	Kenny Wharram	Chicago Black Hawks	RW	1	70	18	0.26
1964–65	Bobby Hull*	Chicago Black Hawks	LW	1	61	32	0.52
1965–66	Alex Delvecchio*	Detroit Red Wings	C	2	70	16	0.23
1966–67	Stan Mikita*	Chicago Black Hawks	C	1	70	12	0.17
1967–68	Stan Mikita*	Chicago Black Hawks	C	2	72	14	0.19
1968–69	Alex Delvecchio*	Detroit Red Wings	C	3	72	8	0.11
1969–70	Phil Goyette	St. Louis Blues	C	1	72	16	0.22
1970–71	Johnny Bucyk*	Boston Bruins	LW	1	78	8	0.10
1971–72	Jean Ratelle*	New York Rangers	C	1	63	4	0.06
1972–73	Gilbert Perreault*	Buffalo Sabres	C	1	78	10	0.13
1973–74	Johnny Bucyk*	Boston Bruins	LW	2	76	8	0.11
1974–75	Marcel Dionne*	Detroit Red Wings	C	1	80	14	0.18
1975–76	Jean Ratelle*	Boston Bruins	C	2	80	18	0.23
1976–77	Marcel Dionne*	Los Angeles Kings	C	2	80	12	0.15
1977–78	Robert "Butch" Goring	Los Angeles Kings	C	1	80	2	0.03
1978–79	Bob MacMillan	Atlanta Flames	C	1	77	14	0.18
1979–80	Wayne Gretzky*	Edmonton Oilers	C	1	79	21	0.27
1980–81	Rick Kehoe	Pittsburgh Penguins	RW	1	80	6	0.08
1981–82	Rick Middleton	Boston Bruins	RW	1	75	12	0.16
1982–83	Mike Bossy*	New York Islanders†	RW	1	79	20	0.25
1983–84	Mike Bossy*	New York Islanders	RW	2	67	8	0.12
1984–85	Jari Kurri*	Edmonton Oilers†	RW	1	73	30	0.41
1985–86	Mike Bossy*	New York Islanders	RW	3	80	14	0.18
1986–87	Joe Mullen*	Calgary Flames	RW	1	79	14	0.18
1987–88	Mats Naslund	Montreal Canadiens	LW	1	78	14	0.18
1988–89	Joe Mullen*	Calgary Flames†	RW	2	79	16	0.20
1989–90	Brett Hull*	St. Louis Blues	RW	1	80	24	0.30
1990–91	Wayne Gretzky*	Los Angeles Kings	C	2	78	16	0.21
1991–92	Wayne Gretzky*	Los Angeles Kings	C	3	74	34	0.46
1992–93	Pierre Turgeon*	New York Islanders	C	1	83	26	0.31
1993–94	Wayne Gretzky*	Los Angeles Kings	C	4	81	20	0.25
1994–95	Ron Francis*	Pittsburgh Penguins	C	1	44	18	0.41
1995–96	Paul Kariya*	Mighty Ducks of Anaheim	LW	1	82	20	0.24
1996–97	Paul Kariya*	Mighty Ducks of Anaheim	LW	2	69	6	0.09
1997–98	Ron Francis*	Pittsburgh Penguins	C	2	81	20	0.25
1998–99	Wayne Gretzky*	New York Rangers	C	5	70	14	0.20
1999–2000	Pavol Demitra	St. Louis Blues	C	1	71	8	0.11
2000–01	Joe Sakic*	Colorado Avalanche†	C	1	82	30	0.37
2001–02	Ron Francis*	Carolina Hurricanes	C	3	80	18	0.23
2002–03	Alexander Mogilny*	Toronto Maple Leafs	RW	1	73	12	0.16
2003–04	Brad Richards	Tampa Bay Lightning†	C	1	82	12	0.15
2004–05	Season cancelled due to the 2004–05 NHL lockout						
2005–06	Pavel Datsyuk*	Detroit Red Wings	C	1	75	22	0.29
2006–07	Pavel Datsyuk*	Detroit Red Wings	C	2	79	20	0.25
2007–08	Pavel Datsyuk*	Detroit Red Wings†	C	3	82	20	0.24
2008–09	Pavel Datsyuk*	Detroit Red Wings	C	4	81	22	0.27
2009–10	Martin St. Louis*	Tampa Bay Lightning	RW	1	82	12	0.15
2010–11	Martin St. Louis*	Tampa Bay Lightning	RW	2	82	12	0.15
2011–12	Brian Campbell	Florida Panthers	D	1	82	6	0.07
2012–13	Martin St. Louis*	Tampa Bay Lightning	RW	3	48	14	0.29
2013–14	Ryan O'Reilly^	Colorado Avalanche	C	1	80	2	0.03
2014–15	Jiri Hudler	Calgary Flames	RW	1	78	14	0.18
2015–16	Anze Kopitar~	Los Angeles Kings	C	1	81	16	0.20
2016–17	Johnny Gaudreau~	Calgary Flames	LW	1	72	4	0.06
2017–18	William Karlsson^	Vegas Golden Knights	C	1	82	12	0.15
2018–19	Aleksander Barkov^	Florida Panthers	C	1	82	8	0.10
2019–20	Nathan MacKinnon^	Colorado Avalanche	C	1	69	12	0.17
2020–21	Jaccob Slavin^	Carolina Hurricanes	D	1	52	2	0.04
2021–22	Kyle Connor^	Winnipeg Jets	LW	1	79	4	0.05
2022–23	Anze Kopitar~	Los Angeles Kings	C	2	82	4	0.05
2023–24	Jaccob Slavin^	Carolina Hurricanes	D	2	81	8	0.10
2024–25	Anze Kopitar~	Los Angeles Kings	C	3	81	4	0.05
2025–26	Cole Caufield^	Montreal Canadiens	RW	1	81	14	0.17

== See also ==
- List of National Hockey League awards
- List of NHL players
- Violence in sports
- NHL violence
- List of awards presented by the governor general of Canada
- List of awards named after governors general of Canada
- Best and fairest awards in Australian sport

== Sources ==
- Boucher, Frank; Frayne, Trent (1973). When The Rangers Were Young. New York, NY: Dodd, Mead & Company. ISBN 0-396-06852-9.
