= Ontario Horticultural Association =

- Abbreviation: OHA
- Formation: 1906; 120 years ago
- President: Sharlene Desjardins
- Main organ: Trillium

The Ontario Horticultural Association (OHA) is a horticultural organization in Ontario, Canada. It was organized in 1905, established in 1906, and incorporated by the Government of Ontario in 1924 via an Act in the Ontario Legislature, which split the Agricultural and Horticultural Societies into the Ontario Agricultural Fairs Association and the OHA. Its founding motto was "Keeping Ontario Beautiful".

Membership to the Ontario Horticultural Association is granted to those horticultural societies that satisfy the requirements of the Ontario Horticultural Societies Act. Each local society may become an affiliate member of the OHA upon remittance of an affiliation fee, and each receives an annual grant based on paid memberships.

The OHA consists of 19 districts comprising autonomous local societies in its region. Its executive council has representatives from each district. Each member society defines guidelines for beautification of its community, including planning, development and maintenance of urban parks. Each local society is also responsible for fundraising, organizing conservation programs, and operating youth programs, and sets its own membership fee.

== Purpose ==
At inception, the organization was established to promote horticultural practices in the province, with a specific focus on ornamental plants. It did so by organizing shows, staging competitions, and hosting courses to "interest juniors and others in the study of horticulture". Today, it is focused on food gardening, for example by promoting the installation of bee nesting boxes by local societies.

The organization presents nine awards at its annual convention, some of which have been awarded since the organization's establishment. Its most prestigious award is the Silver Medal Award. The Silver Fir Award is given to an individual who demonstrates "outstanding service" to the horticultural society in Ontario to which that individual belongs. Others are the Trillium Award, Award of Merit, Community Improvement Award, Environmental Award, Youth Leader Award, and the Honour Roll.

Grants are provided to societies by the OHA for various activities, such as establishing a seed exchange program.

At the 2014 Fall Convention, it established GardenOntario Week, an annual program organizing horticultural events and activities throughout the province.

== See also ==
- Ottawa Horticultural Society
