= Prior Peak =

Mountain in Alberta and British Columbia, Canada

- Location within Alberta Location within British Columbia Location within Canada

Highest point
- Elevation: 3,276 m (10,748 ft)
- Prominence: 33 m (108 ft)
- Parent peak: Mount Barnard (3339 m)
- Listing: Mountains of Alberta; Mountains of British Columbia
- Coordinates: 51°43′15″N 116°55′52″W

Geography
- Country: Canada
- Provinces: Alberta and British Columbia
- Protected area: Banff National Park
- Parent range: Park Ranges
- Topo map: NTS 82N10 Blaeberry River

Climbing
- First ascent: 1937 E. Cromwell, E. Cromwell Jr., Georgia Engelhard, F.S. North, J. M. Thorington

Prior Peak is located at the head of Waitabit Creek on the border of Alberta and British Columbia. It was named in 1924 after Edward Prior, Lieutenant-Governor of British Columbia from 1919-1920.

== See also ==
- List of peaks on the British Columbia–Alberta border
- List of mountains in the Canadian Rockies
