= List of awards presented by the governor general of Canada =

Below is a list of awards presented by the governor general of Canada on behalf of the Canadian monarch. The officeholder presents awards to recognize those people who have demonstrated excellence or exceptional dedication to service in ways that bring special credit to the country.

== Awards ==
- Chief Scout's Award
- Commander-in-Chief Unit Commendation
- Excellence in Teaching Canadian History
- Governor General's Awards
- Jeanne Sauvé Fair Play Award
- John Hnatyshyn Award for Voluntarism in the Arts
- Michener Award
- King's Venturer Award

== Former ==
- Bessborough Trophy
- Dufferin Medal

== See also ==
- List of Canadian awards
- List of awards named after governors general of Canada
