= Michener Award =

Award in Canadian journalism

The Michener Award is one of the highest distinctions in Canadian journalism. The award was founded in 1970 by Roland Michener, who was Governor General of Canada at the time, and his wife Norah. The idea for the award was developed in 1969 with Bill MacPherson, then president of the National Press Club and managing editor of the Ottawa Citizen, who remained a secretary of the committee administering the award until his death. Since 1970, the Michener Award has been presented yearly by the Governor General at Rideau Hall to a Canadian news organization "whose entry is judged to have made a significant impact on public policy or on the lives of Canadians".

Although the award is presented to media organizations rather than individual journalists, five individuals of the nominated finalists are invited to the award ceremony so that their contributions can also be acknowledged. Since 1987, the Michener Foundation also awards annually the Michener-Deacon Fellowship, which provides financial support to a journalist wishing to complete a project that serves the Canadian public interest. The fellowship is named in honor of Roland Michener and late journalist Paul Deacon.

== Past winners ==
Where multiple winners are combined in the table below, the winning work was a collaborative joint project of both news organizations. If two distinct pieces simply finished in a tie, then each work is listed on a separate line.

| Year | Recipients | Work | Refs. |
|---|---|---|---|
| 1970 | Financial Post and CBC Television | The Charter Revolution, a collaborative investigation of the air charter business. | |
| 1971 | CBC Television | The Tenth Decade, a documentary series about Canadian politics in the John Diefenbaker era. | |
| 1972 | The Globe and Mail | Reportage on political conflicts of interest in Ontario. | |
| 1972 | Halifax Scotian Journalist | Reportage on conditions at a women's prison in Moncton, New Brunswick. | |
| 1973 | CTV News | "Hear No Evil, See No Evil, Speak No Evil", an hour-long documentary on the use of covert listening devices and the Canadian government's attempts to legislate around them. | |
| 1974 | Montreal Gazette | Investigation into real estate development in Montreal. | |
| 1975 | Montreal Gazette | Investigation into treatment of girls in youth detention. | |
| 1975 | London Free Press | Series on mercury poisoning in Ontario. | |
| 1976 | Vancouver Sun | Uncovering a series of illegal break-ins by the RCMP. | |
| 1977 | The Globe and Mail | A year-long series of articles calling for reform in systems of child protection. | |
| 1978 | Kitchener-Waterloo Record | Investigation into health and safety conditions at area meat packing plants, which had to be investigated by inspectors from the United States Department of Agriculture due to Canadian inaction. | |
| 1979 | Kingston Whig-Standard | Investigation of unsafe emissions from an aluminum plant in Massena, New York, and their effect on the health of residents of Cornwall and Cornwall. | |
| 1980 | Edmonton Journal | Investigation into abuse in Alberta's child welfare system. | |
| 1981 | CFTM-DT (Montreal) | Investigation into management problems at Quebec's Fédération des caisses d’entraide économique. | |
| 1981 | Kitchener-Waterloo Record | Investigation into a real estate fraud scheme which led to the first jail term ever imposed under Canadian securities legislation. | |
| 1982 | Manitoulin Expositor | Investigation into a local suicide rate almost twice the national average, which led to the creation of a new suicide prevention hotline in Sudbury-Manitoulin. | |
| 1983 | Kitchener-Waterloo Record | Separate stories on Revenue Canada's tax collecting methods, high pressure stock sales in Ontario and quality control problems in farm supply industries, which had been submitted separately but were all judged to be of sufficiently high quality to be honoured collectively. | |
| 1984 | Kingston Whig-Standard | Story on federal tax reform. | |
| 1985 | The Globe and Mail | Problems affecting immigrants. | |
| 1985 | Toronto Star | Series on ethnic minority communities in Toronto. | |
| 1986 | The Globe and Mail | Coverage of an amendment to the Criminal Code which impacted freedom of the press. | |
| 1987 | CBC Television | Runaways: 24 Hours on the Street, a documentary about homeless youth. | |
| 1987 | Southam News | "Southam Literary Project", a series on literacy skills in Canada which sparked a major expansion of adult education programs to assist adults with learning disabilities and other literacy issues. | |
| 1988 | The Globe and Mail | Three investigative reports into real estate corruption in York Region, failures in Canada's business-class immigration programs, and failures by Ontario athletic commissioner Clyde Gray to properly enforce safety regulations in boxing. | |
| 1989 | Le Devoir | Coverage of efforts to expand indigenous self-government rights in the Nunavik region of Quebec. | |
| 1990 | Elmira Independent | Coverage of contamination of the local water supply with dimethylnitrosamine from a Uniroyal plant. | |
| 1991 | CBC Television, Toronto and Winnipeg | Collaborative reports on health insurance fraud, police corruption, furnace repair fraud, immigration practices, a federal tax loophole, and abuse of First Nations band government funds. | |
| 1992 | Edmonton Journal | "Psychiatry on Trial", an examination of the judicial system's reliance on psychiatric testimony. | |
| 1993 | Ottawa Citizen | Coverage of a government plan to privatize Toronto Pearson International Airport. | |
| 1993 | The Globe and Mail | Coverage of the Canadian Red Cross scandal around HIV-tainted blood in the medical blood donation system. | |
| 1994 | CKNW (New Westminster, British Columbia) | Coverage of a controversial power plant. | |
| 1995 | CBO-FM, Ottawa | Investigation of the Somalia Affair, a military scandal surrounding Operation Deliverance. | |
| 1996 | Toronto Star | Reports on spousal abuse in Ontario and flaws in the province's child protection system. | |
| 1997 | Halifax Daily News | Series of articles by David Rodenhiser documenting sexual abuse in Nova Scotia reform schools. | |
| 1998 | Toronto Star | Series of reports on problems of Ontario's health care system. | |
| 1999 | CBC National Radio News, Winnipeg | Curt Petrovich's work to uncover a scandal involving the Progressive Conservative Party's funding of Independent Native Voice during the 1995 Manitoba provincial election. | |
| 2000 | The Fifth Estate | Series of reports on mistakes and abuse of the police and the justice system. | |
| 2001 | The Record | Investigation of the misuse of municipal funds involving MFP Financial Services Ltd. (see RIM Park funding controversy). | |
| 2002 | Toronto Star | Investigation into Race and Crime series of articles. | |
| 2003 | La Presse | Two series of articles on poor hospital care in Montreal. | |
| 2004 | The Globe and Mail | Investigative work on the sponsorship scandal by Daniel Leblanc and Campbell Clark. | |
| 2005 | The Globe and Mail | Series of articles on breast cancer by Lisa Priest. | |
| 2006 | Prince George Citizen | series of articles on the safety of truck drivers in the logging industry. | |
| 2007 | The Globe and Mail and La Presse | Series of articles on the treatment of prisoners of the Canadian forces in Afghanistan, particularly after their handing over to Afghan security forces. | |
| 2008 | CBC News and The Canadian Press | Joint project that investigated the use of taser guns by the Royal Canadian Mounted Police. | |
| 2009 | Montreal Gazette | Reporting on the mismanagement of a water management project in Montreal. | |
| 2010 | the fifth estate | Reporting on the incarceration and death of Ashley Smith. | |
| 2011 | Victoria Times-Colonist | Reporting on a British Columbia government policy that reduced support for people with developmental disabilities. | |
| 2012 | Postmedia and the Ottawa Citizen | Reporting that exposed the "robocall scandal" in the 2011 Canadian federal election. | |
| 2013 | Toronto Star | Coverage of Rob Ford's substance abuse issues. | |
| 2014 | The Globe and Mail | Series on thalidomide. | |
| 2015 | Enquête | "Abus de la SQ: les femmes brisent le silence", an investigation into ongoing physical and sexual abuse of indigenous women in Val-d'Or, Quebec. | |
| 2016 | London Free Press | "Indiscernible", a series that chronicled the jailhouse death of a man with mental illness. | |
| 2017 | The Globe and Mail | Investigation into how Canadian police handle sexual assault complaints. | |
| 2018 | Telegraph-Journal | "Sounding the Alarm", a series on understaffing of emergency medical services in New Brunswick. | |
| 2019 | The Globe and Mail | "False Promises", an investigation into exploitation of temporary workers and foreign students by unscrupulous immigration consultants. | |
| 2020 | APTN | "Death by Neglect", an investigation into how indigenous children are being failed by the child protection system. | |
| 2021 | CBC Saskatoon and The Globe and Mail | Coverage of the campaign to convince the Roman Catholic Church to compensate victims of the Canadian Indian residential school system. | |
| 2022 | The Globe and Mail | "Hockey Canada’s Secret Funds", coverage of the revelations that Hockey Canada was secretly paying out millions of dollars in compensation to settle sexual assault claims without publicly disclosing its use of the money. | |
| 2023 | The Narwhal and Toronto Star | Investigation into the Greenbelt scandal in Ontario. | |
| 2024 | La Presse | Series of in-depth reports uncovering widespread dysfunction within Quebec's youth protection system. | |
| 2025 | Radio-Canada | Olivier Bernard's Podcast series on chronic Lyme disease. | |

== See also ==
- List of awards presented by the governor general of Canada
