= Canadian International Dragon Boat Festival =

Annual festival in Vancouver, British Columbia

The Canadian International Dragon Boat Festival or Concord Pacific Dragon Boat Festival takes place every June on the waters and shoreside of False Creek in Vancouver, British Columbia, Canada. It is North America's largest and most competitive dragon boat festival with over 200 crews competing from around the world, with roots stemming from Expo 86. The Concord Pacific Dragon Boat Festival is run by the Canadian International Dragon Boat Festival Society (commonly Dragon Boat BC).

The Concord Pacific Dragon Boat Festival is a legacy of Expo 86, where Vancouver's Chinese-Canadian community introduced the traditional annual Chinese Duanwu Festival (summer solstice) to Canada as a cultural outreach program to share Chinese culture with the city's multi-cultural population. The dragon boat festival was created to promote sport and Chinese culture, and a meeting place for Vancouver's culturally diverse population to build intercultural harmony and understanding.

Visitors experience a variety of ethnically themed food, cultural entertainment, fine arts and children's programming reflecting Vancouver's cultural diversity, and some of the world's most competitive dragon boat races. The festival has grown to become one of Vancouver's largest family summer events, attracting paddlers ranging in age from high school students to 'grand dragons' in their 80s, and visitors including families of all ages and backgrounds. The festival has many live music performances (Royal Oak Band, etc.) for fans to listen too. The festival celebrates community, culture, and competition by connecting visitors with dragon boat racing, cultural displays, and community organizations that support accessible activity and programs.

== History ==
Volunteers made trips to Hong Kong in 1984 to investigate how to import teak dragon boats. The City of Vancouver Centennial Commission endorsed the plan for an inaugural festival as part of the official civic anniversary festivities. The local committee contacted the Hong Kong Tourism Board (HKTB), and with the financial assistance of businesses connected to Hong Kong (Cathay Pacific Airways, Sing Tao and Empire Stevedoring), brought six teak wooden dragon boats built in Hong Kong to Vancouver for Expo 86. These boats were on display at the Marine Plaza Zone when they were not being used for practices, competitions or ceremonial purposes in support of the Hong Kong Pavilion.

In 1986, the Chinese Cultural Centre of Vancouver organized and hosted the first authentic dragon boat festival in North America, and invited prominent community leaders to be patrons. This committee maintained the fleet of 9 teak dragon boats after 3 more were purchased, under the leadership of Dr. Wallace Chung and Dr. S. Wah Leung. Part of this group of founding volunteers includes David See-Chai Lam and Milton K. Wong, who would later reorganize the Vancouver Festival as the Canadian International Dragon Boat Festival in 1988. Mason Hung, senior IDBF vice-president and Product Development Manager with the HKTB, came to Vancouver as a consultant. The first races adapted the Hong Kong festival's racing rules for use on False Creek, which, like Hong Kong's Victoria Harbour course, is subject to tidal currents. These volunteers organized instruction and training for novices who had never paddled before out of the False Creek Community Centre, home of the recently started False Creek Racing Canoe Club. The popularity of dragon boat racing began to grow quickly- initially there were around 30 teams competing, but this number continued to grow each year to over 100 by the early 1990s.

In 1998, an Asia-Pacific food fair along with performances and entertainment at the Plaza of Nations inspired organizers to expand the dragon boat festival to include a cultural component like in Hong Kong. In 1989, the festival invited and hosted international dragon boat teams to compete, starting with a women's team from Australia and a men's team from Great Britain. Over the next few years, teams flew over from Indonesia, Japan, England, Germany and Australia to compete against teams from Canada and the USA. In recent years, international teams have returned to Vancouver as the festival has grown, with teams participating from around the world, including from China, Hong Kong, Taiwan, the US, Great Britain, Australia, Singapore, Germany, the United Arab Emirates, and many other countries from around the world.

In 1996, 10 years after Vancouver's first race, the 1st IDBF Club Crew World Championships was convened on False Creek during the festival. The 1996 Club Crew World Championships marked the first time that a state-sponsored dragon boat team from China competed outside Asia. Crews competing also flew in from Australia, New Zealand, Germany and England.

In 2008, the festival was rebranded from the Alcan Dragon Boat Festival to the Rio Tinto Alcan Dragon Boat Festival. In 2012, the Society received 8 BuK dragon boats as a donation from Concord Pacific's Terry Hui in honour of Milton Wong, expanding the fleet to 18 BuK dragon boats, and allowing the festival to be raced entirely in BuK boats. In 2016, after many years of support from Rio Tinto Alcan, founding sponsor Concord Pacific became the new title partner of the Concord Pacific Dragon Boat Festival. Concord Pacific also donated $1 million to build a new community boathouse for community paddling operations to support the dragon boat festival and its year round paddling club. The Creekside Paddling Centre houses the festival's equipment and boats year round for use. The festival also expanded back to Concord Pacific Place and Creekside Park in 2016 after being run in the Olympic Village Plaza and Creekside Community Centre.

== Race Course and Festival Site ==
The initial races for Expo 86 were held on the water just to the west of the Cambie Street Bridge. The original race course of 6 lanes were 640 m in length, the same distance as in Hong Kong's Tsim Sha Tsui harbour. The number of lanes increased to 9 as the number of boats available for racing increased, and as registered teams grew from 18 in 1986, to 100 in the 1990s, to over 150 in the 2000s, to 200+ today. The distance also was changed to 500 m, keeping with the development of international racing standards. The race course is subject to tidal streams or currents. The water can be flowing in the same direction boats race (similar effect to a tail wind: shorter time required to go from the start line to the finish line), the opposite direction (similar effect to a head wind: longer time required to go from start to finish), or there is no current during slack tide.

The land portion of the festival has also varied over the last 2 dozen years. Historic venues include the Plaza of Nations on the north shore, Creekside Park on the east shore and Creekside Community Recreation Centre on the south shore. The current Festival site runs along the False Creek seawall starting from Concord Pacific Place on the North shore, to Creekside Park on the East shore, to the Creekside Paddling Centre on the South shore.

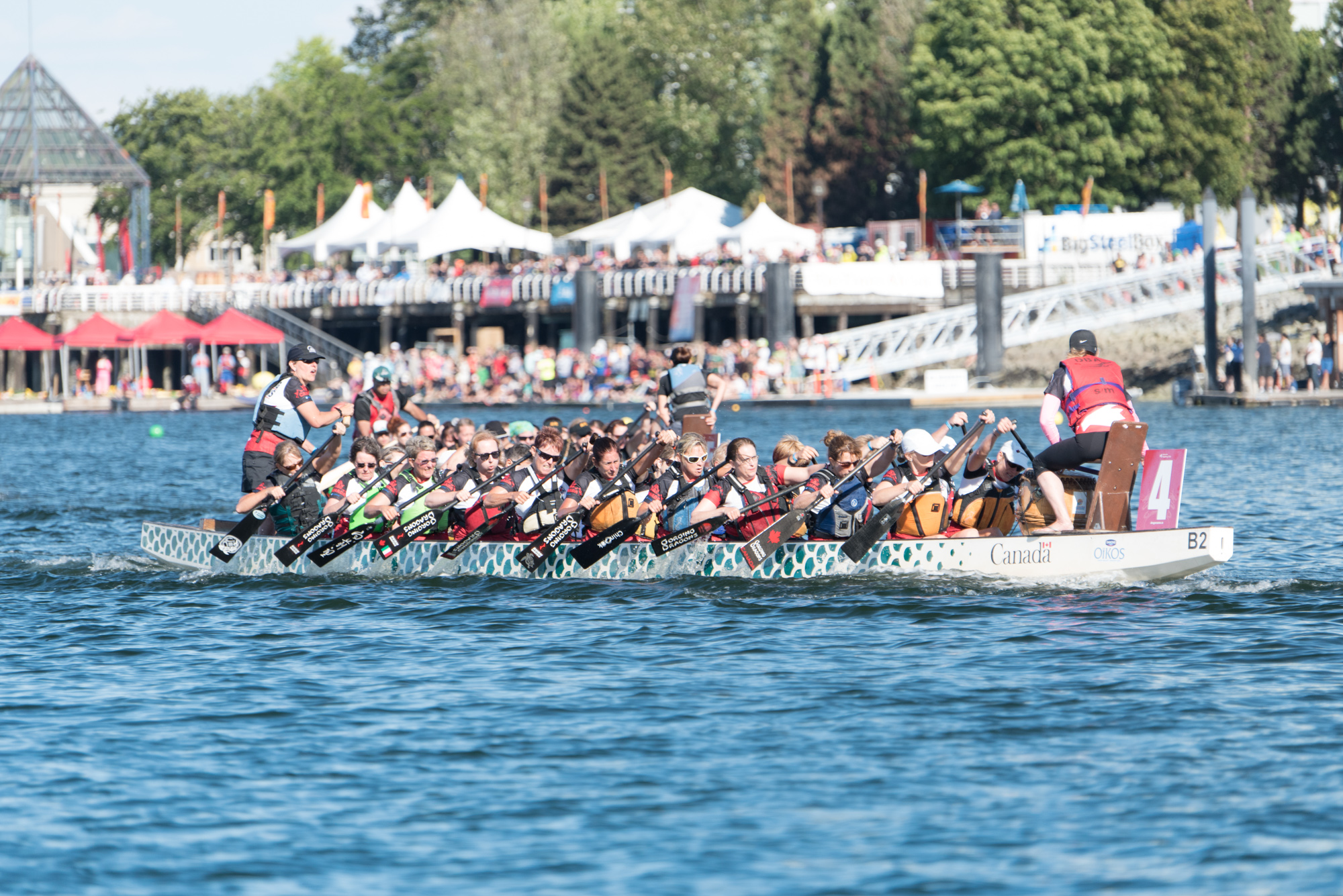
Concord Pacific Dragon Boat Festival in Vancouver

== Festival Races ==
The festival's main divisions are in Premier Mixed and Premier Women. These two divisions each feature a sequence of 500 m races, with the fastest teams then racing in a 2,000 m turns race, where up to 18 boats race in a time trial. Up to 42 Junior Mixed teams compete in a separate division, featuring a sequence of 500 m heats, semi finals, and finals. Other divisions include a Premier Open division. Specialty races include the International Cup (visiting teams face off against Canadian teams in a sequence of races leading up to a 200 m knockout final), the Barrier Free Canada Cup (100 m knockout sprint raising money for seven charities), Breast Cancer Championship, U24 Cup, Grand Dragon's Cup, and Cancer Survivor race.

== Dragon Zone Paddling Club ==
The festival's producers, the Canadian International Dragon Boat Festival Society also operates a series of races and runs Dragon Zone Paddling Club out of Creekside Paddling Centre and Creekside Community Centre. Dragon Zone is a year-round paddling facility on False Creek that offers dragon boat, flatwater kayak and canoe, and outrigger programs for people of all ages, abilities, and competitive levels out of a fully accessible facility. The Society also runs the Dragon Zone Youth Regatta (race for youth in early May), the Dragon Zone Spring Sprint (race in 10 person dragon boats in early May), the Dragon Zone 500 M Regatta (BC's second largest race with over 100 teams in early June), and the Steveston Dragon Boat Festival (last race in the Vancouver dragon boat race calendar in late August).

Over 50 teams regularly train out of Dragon Zone year round, including recreational or competitive teams. The club also offers introduction programs for dragon boat, youth summer flatwater paddling camps, one day programs, community paddling days, and other cultural and paddling programs in partnership with other community organizations.

External links

- Dragon Boat BC
- Concord Pacific Dragon Boat Festival
- Steveston Dragon Boat Festival
- Dragon Zone Paddling Club
