= Roland Michener =

Canadian politician (1900–1991)

The Right Honourable Roland Michener PC CC CMM OOnt CD QC FRHSC(hon)
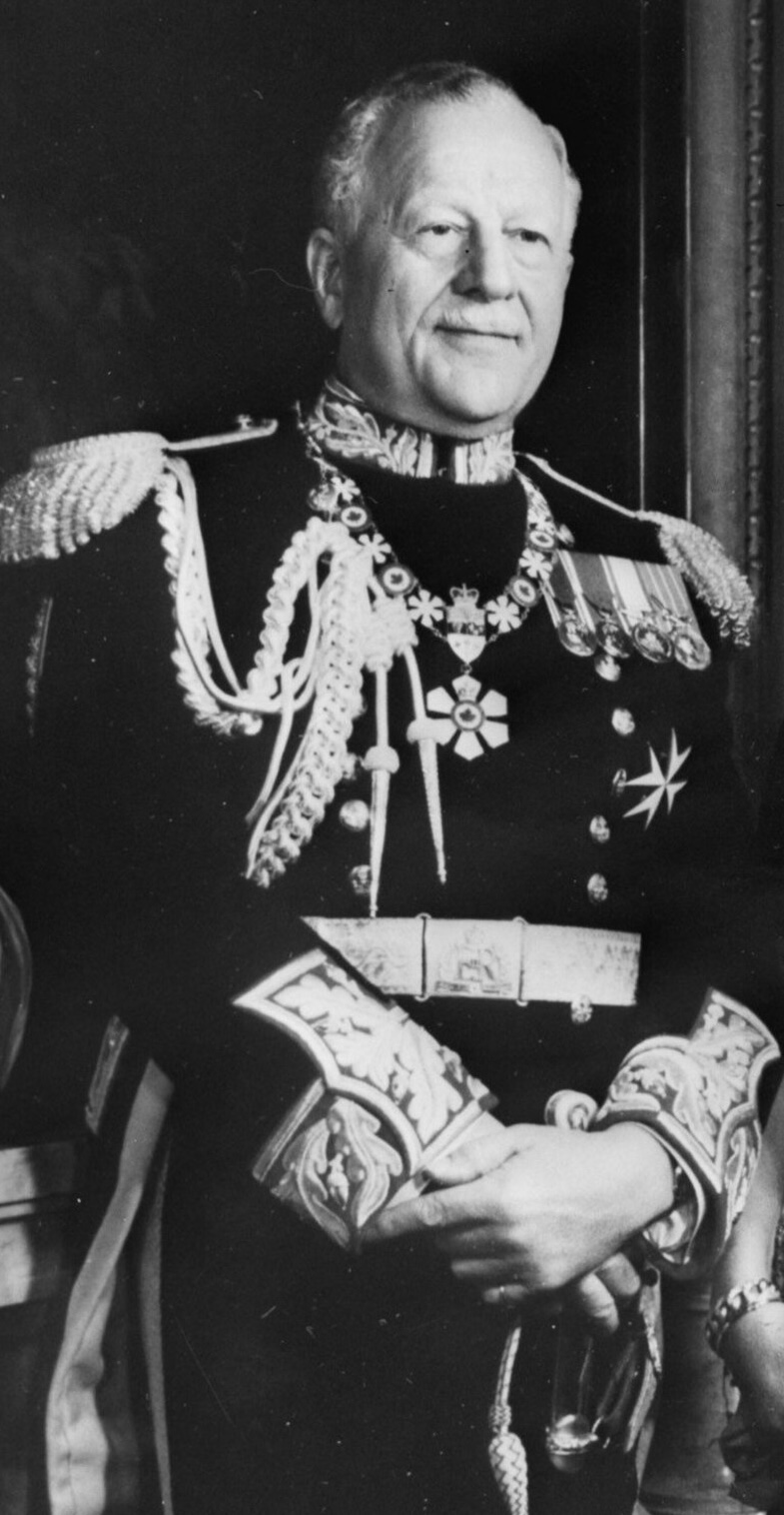
- Michener in 1971

20th Governor General of Canada
- In office April 17, 1967 – January 14, 1974
- Monarch: Elizabeth II
- Prime Minister: Lester B. Pearson; Pierre Trudeau
- Preceded by: Georges Vanier
- Succeeded by: Jules Léger

24th Speaker of the House of Commons of Canada
- In office October 14, 1957 – September 26, 1962
- Preceded by: Louis-René Beaudoin
- Succeeded by: Marcel Lambert

More...

Personal details
- Born: Daniel Roland Michener; April 19, 1900 Lacombe, Northwest Territories, Canada (now Lacombe, Alberta)
- Died: August 6, 1991 (aged 91) Toronto, Ontario, Canada
- Spouse: Norah Michener
- Education: University of Alberta (BA); Hertford College, Oxford (MA, BCL)
- Profession: Lawyer, Politician, Diplomat

Military service
- Allegiance: Canada
- Branch: Canadian Army Cadets; Royal Air Force
- Service years: 1916–19
- Rank: Cadet Half Company Commander; Private 2nd Class
- Unit: Red Deer Cadet Battalion (1916–17); Royal Air Force (1918–19)
- Wars: First World War

Daniel Roland Michener (April 19, 1900 – August 6, 1991) was a Canadian lawyer, politician, and diplomat who served as the 20th governor general of Canada from 1967 to 1974.

Michener was born and educated in Alberta. In 1917 he served briefly in the Royal Air Force. He acquired a university degree, then attended the University of Oxford as a Rhodes Scholar. Michener then returned to Canada and practised law before entering politics. He was elected to the House of Commons in 1953, where he served as speaker from 1957 until 1962, and then served in diplomatic postings between 1964 and 1967. After that he was appointed governor general by Queen Elizabeth II on the recommendation of Prime Minister Lester B. Pearson, to replace Georges Vanier, and he occupied the post until succeeded by Jules Léger in 1974. Michener proved to be a populist governor general whose tenure is considered to be a key turning point in the history of his office.

On October 15, 1962, Michener was sworn into the Queen's Privy Council for Canada. He then served on the boards of various corporations and charities and sat as Chancellor of Queen's University.

== Youth and education ==
Daniel Roland Michener was born in Lacombe, Alberta (then part of the Northwest Territories), to Senator Edward Michener and Mary E. Roland. During the First World War, he served as Cadet Company Commander in the Red Deer Cadet Corps from 1916-1917. On June 25, 1918, he attested for service with the Royal Air Force in Toronto as a 3rd Class Air Mechanic. He was posted to the RAF Recruiting Depot on September 30 as a Private 2nd Class. With the end of the war in November, he was removed from active service on December 22, 1918 and discharged as a Private 2nd Class (Cadet Pilot) on January 4, 1919.

Michener attended the University of Alberta, where he earned a Bachelor of Arts degree and a Rhodes Scholarship that took him to Hertford College at the University of Oxford. There, he played for the Oxford University Ice Hockey Club and met Lester B. Pearson, who was his lifelong friend. After completing his Master of Arts and Bachelor of Civil Law degrees, Michener returned to Canada, settled in Toronto and practised law. At the same time, he acted as the general secretary for the Rhodes Foundation in Canada between 1936 and 1964 and sat as chairman of the Manitoba Royal Commission on Local Government.

On February 26, 1927, in St. Mary Magdalene Anglican Church, Michener married Norah Willis; the couple had three daughters.

== Political career ==
Michener first ran for political office in Ontario's 1943 election as the Progressive Conservative candidate in the riding of St. David, but was defeated by William Dennison of the Co-operative Commonwealth Federation (CCF). Michener ran in St. David again in the 1945 election and defeated Dennison this time Michener was then appointed to Premier George Drew's cabinet as provincial secretary and registrar of Ontario, being responsible for formalizing cabinet procedures, including agenda and minutes. In the 1948 provincial election, Dennison took St. David back from Michener.

Michener then tried to enter federal politics in the 1949 election but was unsuccessful. He tried again in the election of 1953 and was elected in the riding of St. Paul's. In 1956, the Progressive Conservative party chose John Diefenbaker as its leader at its leadership convention, and in the election the following year the Tories attained a minority government. Michener was appointed speaker of the House of Commons, after the post was turned down by Stanley Knowles.

As Speaker, Michener angered Diefenbaker by allowing the opposition a great degree of latitude during Question Period; at one point, on May 25, 1959, Diefenbaker was so flustered that he refused to sit down when called to order by Michener. Actions like these, among others, impressed parliamentary observers and a group of university professors initiated a campaign to make Michener's position as speaker permanent; they proposed that, as is the tradition with the Speaker of the House of Commons of the United Kingdom, Michener run as an independent in general elections and that the political parties agree not to run candidates against him. No such agreement, however came to pass, and when Michener ran for re-election in 1962 he was defeated. This was the first time since 1867 that a speaker had lost his riding in an election in which his party formed the government. Michener returned to Toronto and dedicated his time to his law practice, Lang Michener LLP.

In the 1963 federal election the Liberal Party under Michener's old friend, Lester Pearson, won a minority in the House. A year later, Pearson advised Governor General Georges Vanier to appoint Michener to the diplomatic post of high commissioner to India, which Michener took up on July 9, 1964. Six months later Michener became Canada's first ambassador to Nepal. While stationed on those foreign duties, Michener was told by the Prime Minister that he would be considered among the leading candidates for the post of Governor General when he returned to Canada. But Vanier was in poor health and, though he offered to stay on as viceroy through to the end of the Canadian Centennial celebrations, Pearson did not wish to advise Queen Elizabeth II to allow it. The night after he conferred with the prime minister about that matter, Vanier died on March 5 at Rideau Hall, leaving Chief Justice Robert Taschereau as Administrator of the Government in the absence of a viceroy.

== Governor General of Canada ==
Michener was immediately recalled from India and, on March 29, 1967, Queen Elizabeth II appointed Michener as the Governor General on Pearson's advice. Although he was a Conservative, Liberal members of parliament and cabinet ministers welcomed the selection of Michener; Paul Martin Sr. said, "I don’t think there was anybody inside or outside the public service who could qualify better than Michener... People just felt that this was a good appointment." Michener was sworn in during a ceremony in the Senate chamber on April 17, after one of the shortest periods served by a Governor General-designate.

Only ten days after Michener was made viceroy, he opened Expo 67 in Montreal. The exposition, held on the 100th anniversary of Confederation, attracted fifty-three heads of state and numerous other dignitaries; as the representative of Canada's head of state, Michener greeted and held audience with each of them. Among the guests were United States President Lyndon B. Johnson; Princess Grace of Monaco; former US First Lady Jacqueline Kennedy; Emperor Haile Selassie of Ethiopia; and French president Charles de Gaulle. Michener welcomed de Gaulle when he landed at his first stop in Canada, Quebec City, and was present when the French president declared "Vive le Québec libre" to a crowd at Montreal City Hall. The crowd cheered de Gaulle wildly, but booed and jeered Michener when the Royal Anthem, "God Save the Queen", was played at his arrival.

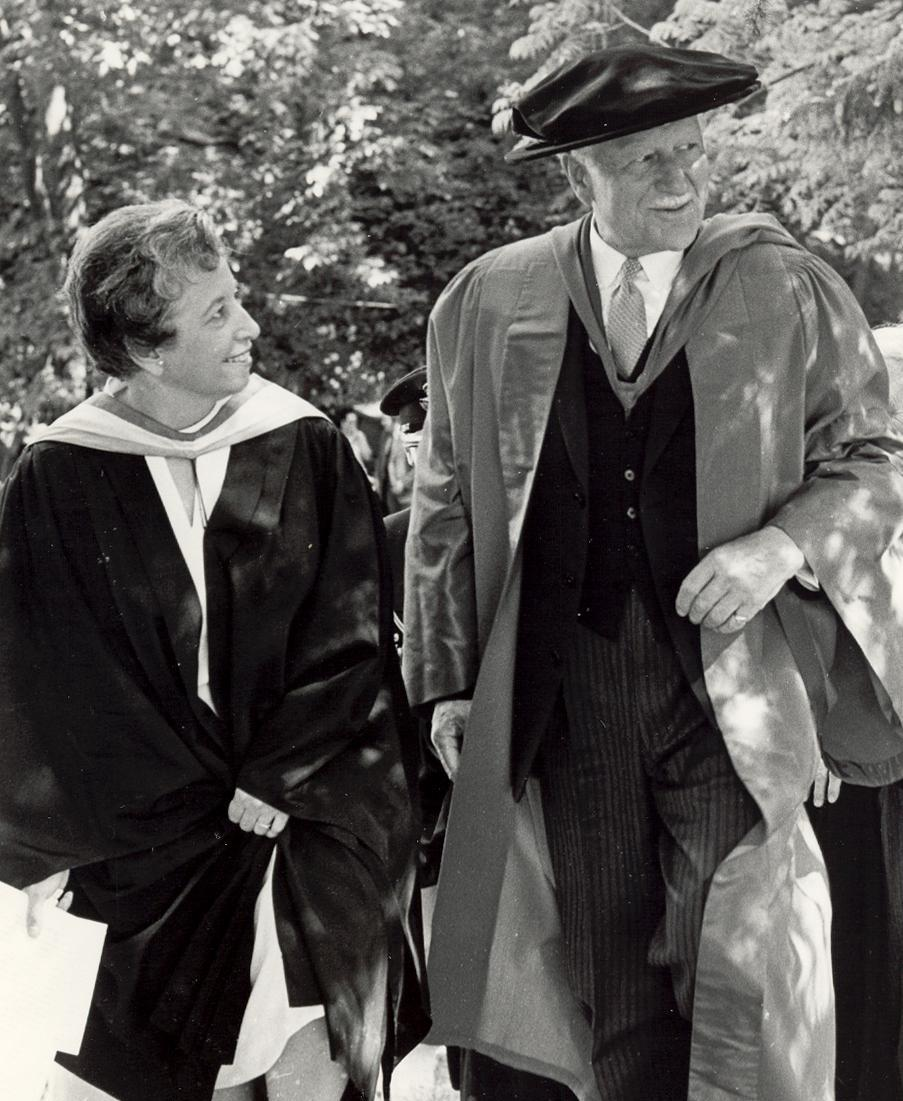
Michener attending the graduation ceremonies at Alma College in 1972

Within less than a year of his becoming viceroy, Michener found himself faced with a constitutional crisis when Pearson's government was unexpectedly defeated on a tax bill in February 1968. Had the government been unable to pass a full budget bill, then Pearson would have been legally required to resign or ask for a new election, but the conventions relating to lesser financial bills were less clear. After taking much legal advice, Michener decreed that he would not ask for Pearson's resignation unless an explicit motion of no confidence against the government was passed. Opposition leader Robert Stanfield immediately tabled such a motion, but it ultimately failed after the other main opposition parties, the New Democratic Party and Ralliement créditiste, declined to support the motion. An election nonetheless took place in June of that year, following Pearson's retirement and replacement by Pierre Trudeau.

In October 1970, members of the Front de libération du Québec (FLQ) kidnapped British trade commissioner James Cross and Quebec's minister of labour, Pierre Laporte, thus sparking the October Crisis. In 2010, in interviews with Jacques Lanctôt, Jacques Rose, and other involved in the kidnappings, done for a documentary aired on Tout le monde en parle, it was revealed that Michener had been the FLQ's intended target; it was alleged that the FLQ leaders planned to commandeer the Canadian Broadcasting Corporation's Télévision de Radio-Canada and conduct a 24-hour telethon with the Governor General bound in a chair as a prop on the stage. Upon the kidnappings, Michener, as Governor-in-Council, invoked the War Measures Act, and Quebec police, with the support of the Canadian Forces, rounded up hundreds of individuals, leading to the detention of the kidnappers and their accomplices.

On July 1, 1967, the Order of Canada was created, and Michener became the order's first member, as well as the first chancellor and principal companion. As such, he presided over the first investiture ceremony, at Rideau Hall, on July 9, investing 90 people into the order. On a visit to London, United Kingdom, he presented the insignia of the Sovereign of the order to Queen Elizabeth II. On July 1, 1972, the Order of Military Merit was founded and Michener was appointed the first Chancellor and Commander.

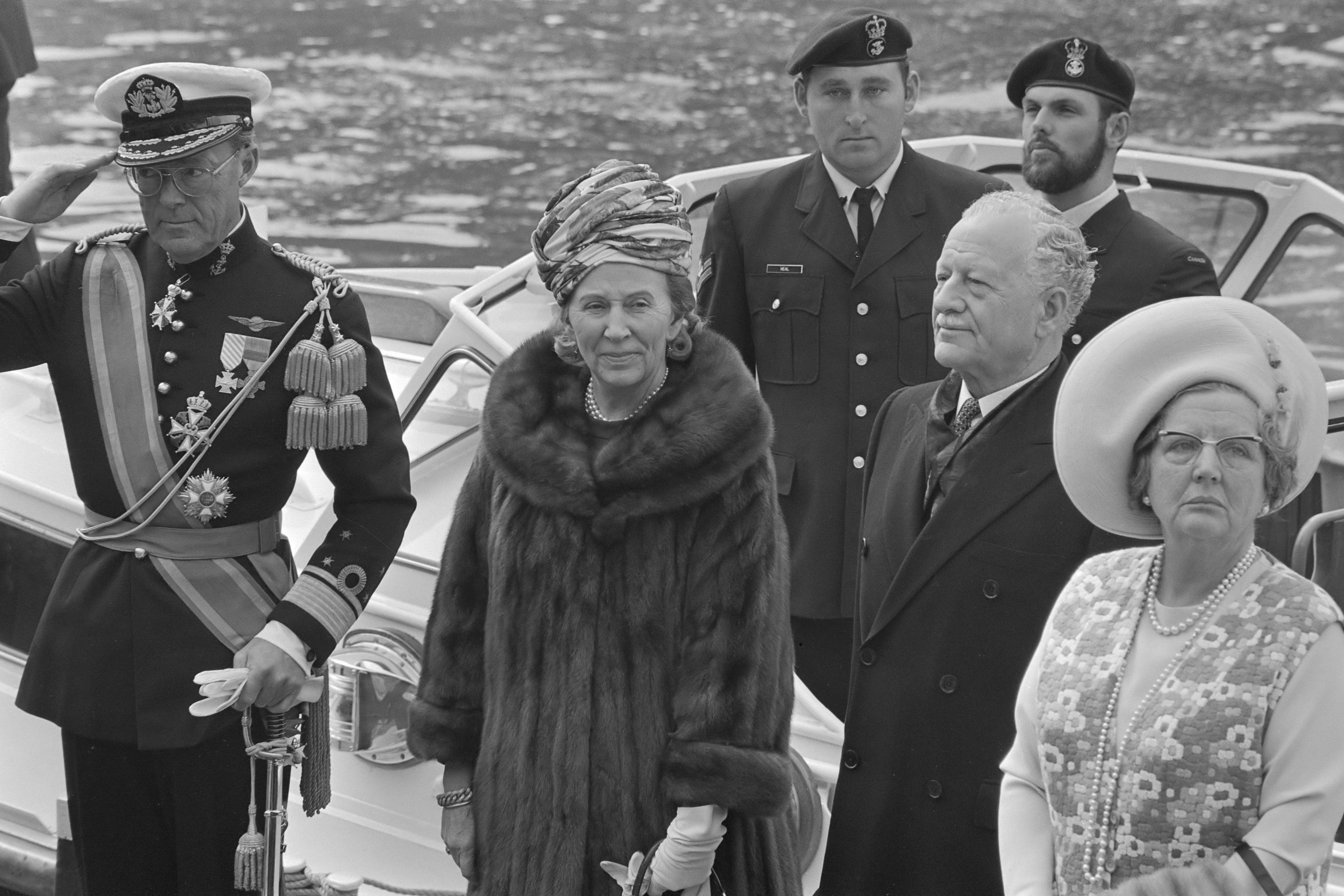
Left to right at front: Prince Bernhard of Lippe-Biesterfeld, Norah Michener, Roland Michener, and Queen Juliana in Amsterdam, April 14, 1971

Another first was Michener's state visit in 1971 to Trinidad and Tobago; while King George VI and Queen Elizabeth II had both carried out state visits on behalf of Canada and previous governors general had made official visits abroad, no Canadian governor general had ever previously undertaken such a trip. In October of the same year, the Governor General visited Iran to attend the Iranian monarchy's 2,500th anniversary. These voyages initially caused controversy among diplomatic insiders in Ottawa, who viewed it as inappropriate for someone who was not the country's head of state to undertake a state visit. However, the successes of the trip helped end the controversy, and established a precedent thereafter followed in Canada, and adopted by other Commonwealth realms.

=== Legacy ===
Though he wore the elaborate court uniform for state occasions, Michener discontinued the practice of women curtseying before the governor general, a move that was rumoured to have been inspired by the refusal of Maryon Pearson, wife of Prime Minister Lester Pearson, to defer thus to her long-time friends. He also fostered links between his position and those of the lieutenant-governors of the provinces by holding periodic meetings with them, starting in 1973. He was, however, criticized for not reacting to Pierre Trudeau's "contemptuous musings" about the Crown and the governor general.

Michener created two awards to be bestowed on Canadians. Reflecting his interest in sport fishing, he formed the Michener Tuna Trophy and, in demonstration of his strong relationship with many reporters and journalists, he founded in 1970 the Michener Award for Journalism. In return, besides being bestowed with a number of honours by both the Queen-in-Council and private organizations, Michener became the second of only two Canadians, after former governor general Vincent Massey, to be presented with the Royal Victorian Chain, a personal gift of the monarch, awarded to him by Queen Elizabeth II for his service.

== Retirement and death ==
After his term as governor general, Michener and his wife moved to Toronto. They lived at 24 Thornwood Road in the Rosedale neighbourhood. Michener remained active in business throughout the country; he sat on boards of directors and promoted Canadian charities and cultural institutions. From 1973 to 1980, he served as chancellor of Queen's University, and he promoted physical activity to school children and seniors alike. To provide an example to follow, he, at the age of 80, climbed to the peak of Alberta's Mount Michener, to participate in the ceremony marking the Alberta Crown-in-Council's naming of the mountain after him. In 1990, he also agreed to allow his name to be used by the Michener Institute.

In the mid-1980s, Michener became a caretaker for his wife after she was afflicted with Alzheimer's disease. She died in Toronto on January 12, 1987, and Michener followed on August 6, 1991. Their ashes repose in St. Bartholomew's Anglican Church in Ottawa, directly across Sussex Drive from Rideau Hall.

== Honours and arms ==
Michener's personal awards and decorations include the following:

Appointments

- (Canada) June 4, 1945 – June 7, 1948: Member of Provincial Parliament (MPP)
- (Canada) August 10, 1953 – June 18, 1962: Member of Parliament (MP)
- October 15, 1962 – August 6, 1991: Member of the Queen's Privy Council for Canada (PC)
- April 17, 1967 – January 14, 1974: Knight of Justice, Prior, and Chief Officer in Canada of the Most Venerable Order of the Hospital of Saint John of Jerusalem (KStJ)
  - January 14, 1974 – August 6, 1991: Knight of Justice of the Most Venerable Order of the Hospital of Saint John of Jerusalem (KStJ)
- April 17, 1967 – January 14, 1974: Chief Scout of Canada
- 1967 – August 6, 1991: Honorary Member of the Royal Military College of Canada Club
- July 1, 1967 – January 14, 1974: Chancellor and Principal Companion of the Order of Canada (CC)
  - January 14, 1974 – August 6, 1991: Companion of the Order of Canada
- (Canada) July 1, 1972 – January 14, 1974: Chancellor and Commander of the Order of Military Merit (CMM)
  - January 14, 1974 – August 6, 1991: Commander of the Order of Military Merit (CMM)
- 1975 – August 6, 1991: Honorary Fellow of the Royal Heraldry Society of Canada (FRHSC(hon))
- 1990 – 1991: Member of the Order of Ontario (OOnt)

Medals

- (Canada) 1937: King George VI Coronation Medal
- (Canada) 1953: Queen Elizabeth II Coronation Medal
- (Canada) April 17, 1967: Canadian Forces' Decoration (CD)
- (Canada) 1967: Canadian Centennial Medal
- (Canada) 1977: Queen Elizabeth II Silver Jubilee Medal
- (Iran) 1971: Commemorative Medal of the 2500th Anniversary of the founding of the Persian Empire.

Awards

- 1973: Royal Victorian Chain

=== Honorary military appointments ===
- (Canada) April 17, 1967 – January 14, 1974: Colonel of the Governor General's Horse Guards
- (Canada) April 17, 1967 – January 14, 1974: Colonel of the Governor General's Foot Guards
- (Canada) April 17, 1967 – January 14, 1974: Colonel of the Canadian Grenadier Guards

=== Honorary degrees ===
- (Canada) 1958: Queen's University, Doctor of Laws (LLD)
- (Canada) 1967: University of Alberta, Doctor of Laws (LLD)

=== Honorific eponyms ===
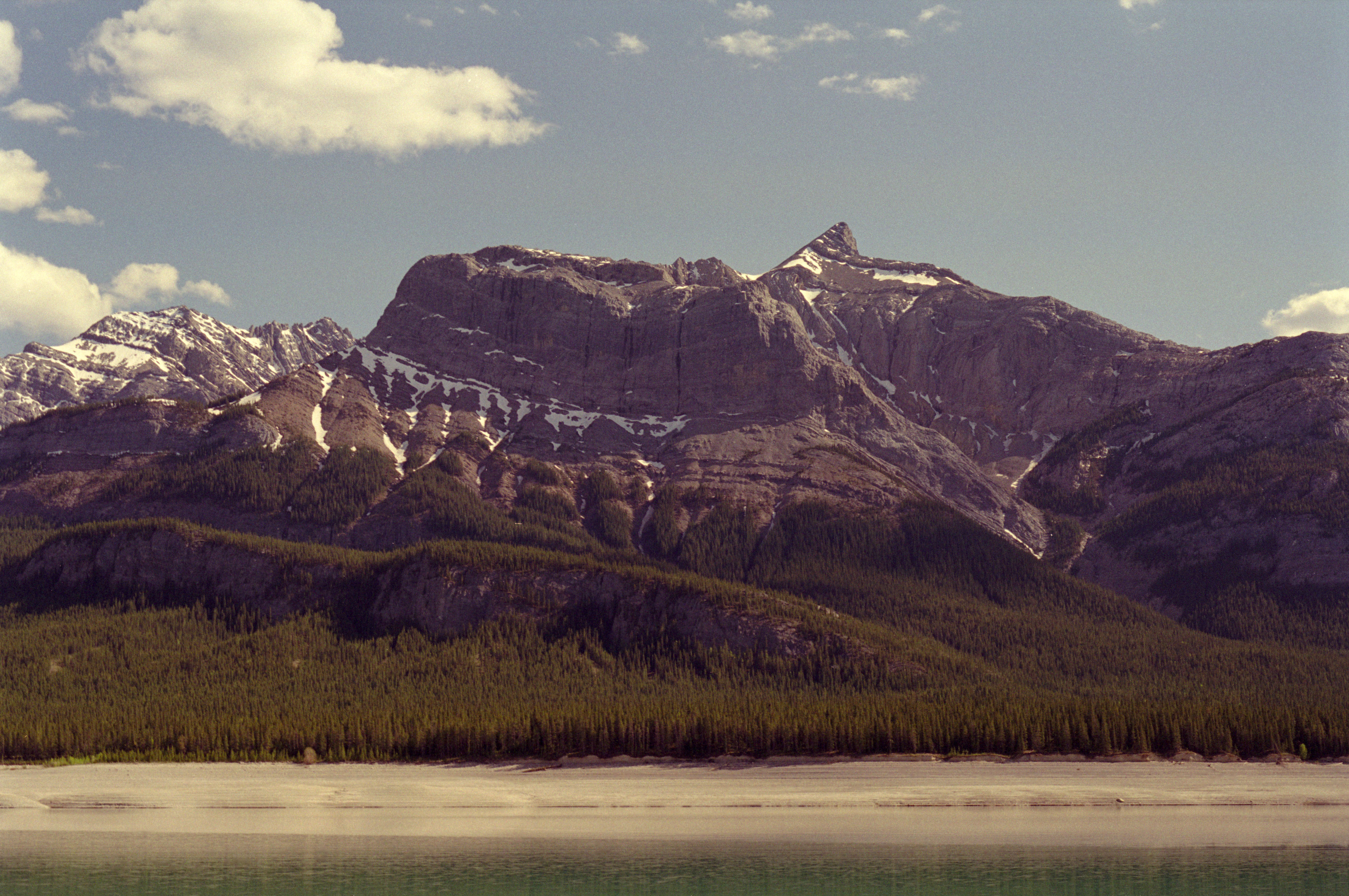
Mount Michener's north face

Awards

- Canada: Michener Award for Journalism
- Canada: Michener Fellowships (later Michener/Deacon Fellowships)
- Ontario: Roland Michener Trophy

Organisations

- Canada: Michener Awards Foundation
- Ontario: The Michener Institute

Geographic locations

- Alberta: Mount Michener
- Saskatchewan: Michener Drive – Regina
- Saskatchewan: Michener Crescent, Court, Place, Way – Saskatoon
- Newfoundland and Labrador: Michener Avenue – Mount Pearl

Buildings

- Manitoba: Roland Michener Arena, Transcona

Schools

- Alberta: Roland Michener Elementary, Calgary
- Alberta: Roland Michener Secondary School, Slave Lake
- Ontario: Roland Michener Public School, Ajax
- Ontario: Roland Michener Public School, Kanata
- Ontario: Roland Michener Secondary School, Timmins
- Saskatchewan: Roland Michener School, Saskatoon

=== Arms ===
Coat of arms of Roland Michener
Notes As Michener served as governor general prior to the establishment of the Canadian Heraldic Authority, he was granted a coat of arms by the body previously responsible for heraldry in Canada: the College of Arms, in London, United Kingdom. Adopted June 10, 1968 Crest In front of a demi-lion supporting a representation of the Mace of the House of Commons of Canada Or a Plate charged with a Maple Leaf Gules. Escutcheon Azure four bendlets interlaced in saltire between in chief a representation of the Royal Crown Or and in base a Fleur de Lis Or. Supporters On the dexter side a Deer Gules attired and unguled Or charged on the shoulder with a Plate thereon a Rose Gules barbed and seeded proper and on the sinister side a Deer Argent attired and unguled Or charged on the shoulder with a Torteau thereon a Square Buckle Argent. Motto LIBRE ET ORDONNÉ (Free and ordained) Orders The insignias of a Companion of the Order of Canada and of a Commander of the Order of Military Merit. Symbolism The mace is that of the House of Commons, evoking Michener's time as speaker of that chamber; the lion holding it is drawn from the coat of arms of Alberta, the symbol of the province in which Michener was born; and the maple leaf is the floral symbol of Canada. The Crown represents the Canadian sovereign that Léger represented as viceroy, while the Fleur de Lys is emblematic of French-Canadian culture. The red deer to the left recalls Red Deer, Alberta, of which Michener's father was mayor, and the wild rose affixed to the deer is also the official flower of Alberta. The two medallions beneath the shield signify that Michener was a member of both the Order of Canada and the Order of Military Merit.

== Archives ==
There is a Roland Michener fonds at Library and Archives Canada.

== See also ==
- Lacombe, Alberta residents

Government offices
Preceded by Georges Vanier	Governor General of Canada; April 17, 1967 – January 14, 1974	Succeeded by Jules Léger
Political offices
Drew ministry, Province of Ontario (1943–1948)
Preceded by George Harrison Dunbar	Provincial Secretary and Registrar of Ontario; April 15, 1946 – October 19, 1948	Succeeded by Dana Porter
Parliament of Canada
Preceded by Louis-René Beaudoin	Speaker of the House of Commons; October 14, 1957 – September 27, 1962	Succeeded by Marcel Lambert
Preceded by James Rooney	Member of Parliament for St. Paul's; August 10, 1953 – June 18, 1962	Succeeded by Ian Wahn
Legislative Assembly of Ontario
Preceded by William Dennison	Member for St. David; June 4, 1945 – June 7, 1948	Succeeded by William Dennison
Diplomatic posts
New title	Canadian Ambassador to Nepal; December 23, 1964 – April 13, 1967	Succeeded by James George
Preceded by Edward Rose Rettie	Canadian High Commissioner to India; July 9, 1964 – April 9, 1967	Succeeded by Douglas Barcham Hicks
Academic offices
Preceded by John Bertram Stirling	Chancellor of Queen's University; 1973–1980	Succeeded by Agnes Benidickson
