= Gulf and Kuwait Medal =

Canadian campaign medal

- Obverse of the medal
- Type: Campaign medal
- Awarded for: Campaign service.
- Presented by: The monarch of Canada
- Eligibility: All members of the Canadian Forces.
- Campaign: Gulf War (1990–1991)
- Clasps: Direct combat for a minimum of one day between 16 January 1991 and 3 March 1991
- Established: 2 August 1990

Highlights
- Total: 4,109
- Ribbon of the Gulf and Kuwait Medal

Precedence
- Next (higher): Canadian Volunteer Service Medal for Korea
- Next (lower): Somalia Medal

The Gulf and Kuwait Medal (French: Médaille du Golfe et du Koweït, or Médaille du Golfe et du Kuwait) was a campaign medal created in 1990 to recognize members of the Canadian Forces who had directly participated in the Gulf War, either in the hostilities themselves or during the troop build-up prior to the invasion of Iraq. It is, within the Canadian system of honours, the third highest of the war and operational service medals.

== Design ==
Designed by Bruce W. Beatty, the Gulf and Kuwait Medal is in the form of a 36 millimetres (1.4 in) diameter rhodium plated tombac disc with, on the obverse, the Latin words ELIZABETH II DEI GRATIA REGINA (Elizabeth II, by the Grace of God, Queen) and CANADA surrounding an effigy of Queen Elizabeth II, symbolizing her roles as both fount of honour and Commander-in-Chief of the Canadian Forces. On the reverse is a laurel wreath with a maple leaf at its base encircling the words: GULF AND KUWAIT • 1990-1991 • LE GOLFE ET KUWAIT.

This medallion is worn at the left chest, suspended on a 31.8mm wide ribbon coloured with vertical stripes in light blue (representing the Air Command), scarlet (representing the Land Force Command), and dark blue (recalling the Maritime Command), symmetrically flanking a sand coloured central stripe. Originally, the Gulf and Kuwait medal was to have coincidentally had the same ribbon as the British Gulf Medal; only after the manufacturer of the ribbon informed the Chancellery of Honours at Rideau Hall were the two shades of blue on the Canadian version reversed.

Should an individual already possessing a Gulf and Kuwait Medal be awarded the medal bar for combat service, he or she is granted a clasp— in cupro-nickel and bearing a maple leaf— for wear on the ribbon from which the original medal is suspended.

== Eligibility and allocation ==
On 2 August 1990, Queen Elizabeth II, on the advice of her Cabinet under Prime Minister Brian Mulroney, approved the Gulf and Kuwait Medal to recognize members of the Canadian Forces who had served in the theatre of the Gulf War. To qualify for the medal, individuals had to have served for 30 consecutive days between 2 August 1990 and 27 June 1991 in the region of the Persian Gulf as a part of the operation to liberate Kuwait from the invading Iraqi forces, and those who for a minimum of one day engaged in direct combat with the enemy during the offensive that lasted from 16 January to 3 March 1991 were entitled to receive the additional medal bar; in total, 4,436 medals were issued, along with 3,184 bars.

== See also ==
- Canadian order of precedence (decorations and medals)
- Gulf War military awards
