= Kuwait Liberation Medal =

Kuwait Liberation Medal may refer to:

- Kuwait Liberation Medal (Kuwait)
- Kuwait Liberation Medal (Saudi Arabia)
- Medal for the Liberation of Kuwait (Bahrain), see Gulf War military awards#Medal for the Liberation of Kuwait (Bahrain)
- Kuwait Liberation Medal (Egypt), see Gulf War military awards#Kuwait Liberation Medal (Egypt)
- Medal for the Liberation of Kuwait (United Arab Emirates), see Gulf War military awards#Medal for the Liberation of Kuwait (United Arab Emirates)

== See also ==
- Gulf War Military Awards
