= Somalia Medal =

- Type: Campaign medal
- Awarded for: Campaign service.
- Presented by: The monarch of Canada
- Eligibility: All members of the Canadian Forces.
- Campaign: Somali Civil War (1992-1993)
- Clasps: None
- Established: 1992

Highlights
- Total: 1,408
- Ribbon of the Somalia Medal

Precedence
- Next (higher): Gulf and Kuwait Medal
- Next (lower): South-West Asia Service Medal

The Somalia Medal (French: Médaille de la Somalie) was a campaign medal created in 1992 by the Canadian monarch-in-Council to recognize members of the Canadian Forces who had directly participated in the international military coalition invasion to stabilize Somalia following the outbreak of its civil war. It is, within the Canadian system of honours, the fourth highest of the war and operational service medals.

== Design ==
Designed by Bruce W. Beatty, the Somalia Medal is in the form of a 36 millimetres (1.4 in) diameter gold plated bronze medal with, on the obverse, three overlapping maple leaves between the word CANADA above (which the original design did not include) and two sprigs of laurel leaves below. On the reverse is the Royal Cypher of Queen Elizabeth II surmounted by a St. Edward's Crown— symbolizing the sovereign's roles as both fount of honour and Commander-in-Chief of the Canadian Forces— circumscribed by the words SOMALIA • 1992-93 • SOMALIE.

This medallion is worn at the left chest, suspended on a 31.8mm wide ribbon coloured with vertical stripes with two in the shade of blue used by the United Nations flanking a series in white (representing peace), sand (recalling the physical features of the theatre of operations), light blue (representing the Air Command), scarlet (representing the Land Force Command), and dark blue (recalling the Maritime Command).

== Eligibility and allocation ==
Though the Governor General-in-Council did not originally intend to issue a medal for the Somalia campaign, due to the so called scandal that had taken place there, on 8 April 1997, Queen Elizabeth II, on the advice of her Cabinet under Prime Minister Jean Chrétien, created the Somalia Medal to recognize members of the Canadian Forces who had served in the theatre of the Somali Civil War. To qualify for the medal, individuals had to have served for 90 days between 16 November 1992 and 30 June 1993 in Somalia, or within 200 kilometers of the Somali coast, as a part of the operation to stabilize the country and offer humanitarian aid. However, the requirements for the Somalia Medal were the first to specifically demand "honourable service", meaning that those members of the Canadian Airborne Regiment involved in the murder of a Somali thief who tried breaking into the Canadian base were not among the total 1,408 medals that were issued. The mission by Canada was referred to as Operation Deliverance, and there was only one tour there in Somalia. Unfortunately the one incident of the death of the Somali over shadowed all the heroic acts of bravery and good the Canadian soldiers achieved while on tour there.

== See also ==
- Canadian order of precedence (decorations and medals)
