= Canadian Volunteer Service Medal for Korea =

- Type: Campaign medal
- Awarded for: Campaign service.
- Presented by: The monarch of Canada
- Eligibility: Former members of the Canadian Army, Royal Canadian Navy, and Royal Canadian Air Force.
- Campaign: Korean War (1950–1953)
- Clasps: None
- Established: 12 July 1991

Highlights
- Total: 18,289
- Ribbon of the Canadian Volunteer Service Medal for Korea

Precedence
- Next (higher): Korea Medal
- Next (lower): Gulf and Kuwait Medal
- Related: United Nations Korea Medal

The Canadian Volunteer Service Medal for Korea (French: Médaille canadienne de service volontaire en Corée) was a campaign medal created in 1991 by the Canadian monarch-in-Council to recognize former members of the Canadian Army, Royal Canadian Navy, and Royal Canadian Air Force who had volunteered to participate in the Korean War, either on the Korean Peninsula itself or in surrounding areas. It is, within the Canadian system of honours, the second highest of the war and operational service medals.

== Design ==
Designed by Bruce W. Beatty, the Canadian Volunteer Service Medal for Korea is in the form of a 38 millimetres (1.5 in) diameter rhodium plated tombac disc with, on the obverse, the Latin words ELIZABETH II DEI GRATIA REGINA CANADA (Elizabeth II by the Grace of God Queen, Canada) surrounding an effigy of Queen Elizabeth II, symbolizing her roles as both fount of honour and Commander-in-Chief of the Canadian Forces. On the reverse is a laurel wreath with a maple leaf at its base encircling the words: KOREA VOLUNTEER • 1950–1954 • VOLONTAIRE CORÉE. This medallion is worn at the left chest, suspended on a 31.8mm wide ribbon coloured with vertical stripes in the shade of blue used by the United Nations, yellow, red, and white.

== Eligibility and allocation ==
After the Chancellery of Honours at Rideau Hall had for a number of years received complaints about the absence of a volunteer service medal for the Korean War, as had been provided for those who served in the Second World War, Queen Elizabeth II, on the advice of her Cabinet under Prime Minister Brian Mulroney, in 1991 created the Canadian Volunteer Service Medal for Korea to recognize any former member, living or deceased, of the Canadian Army, Royal Canadian Navy, or Royal Canadian Air Force who had served in the theatre of the Korean War, but did not, at the time, meet the requirements for the Korea Medal. To qualify, individuals had to have fought with an army unit on the Korean Peninsula for at least one day, served aboard ship in the Yellow Sea or Sea of Japan, flown a minimum of one sortie over Korea or Korean waters, or engaged in military operations for no less than 28 days within the qualifying area. 18,289 Canadian Volunteer Service Medals for Korea were distributed.

== See also ==
- Canadian order of precedence (decorations and medals)
