= Joan Buchanan (sergeant) =

Canadian military person

Joan Buchanan is a Canadian retired soldier.

Born in Montego Bay, Jamaica, Buchanan emigrated to Canada at age 17. She enlisted in the Canadian Armed Forces and completed basic training in 1987 before being assigned as a Resource Management Systems clerk. She was deployed to Bosnia and Herzegovina as part of the NATO peacekeeping force in 2000.

Buchanan faced racial prejudice from colleagues and the command structure which inhibited her career trajectory; she was promoted to the rank of master corporal after a successful grievance filing, and three years later was made a sergeant. In an effort to address these concerns she co-chaired the Defence Visible Minority Advisory Group. She retired from active duty in 2014 and assumed a role as civilian administrator with the Canadian Forces Support Unit.

She received the NATO Service Medal, the South-West Asia Service Medal, the General Tommy Franks Commendation for volunteerism, and a Corporate Award in Human Resource Management.
