= South-West Asia Service Medal =

- Obverse and reverse of the medal
- Type: Campaign medal
- Awarded for: Campaign service
- Presented by: The monarch of Canada
- Eligibility: All members of the Canadian Forces.
- Campaign: Various against terrorism in South-West Asia after 11 September 2001
- Clasps: Direct combat for a minimum of 30 days after 11 September 2001
- Status: Currently awarded
- Established: 6 August 2002
- First award: 20 September 2002

Highlights
- Total: 7,497
- South-West Asia Service Medal ribbon South-West Asia Service Medal ribbon with Afghanistan bar South-West Asia Service Medal ribbon with Afghanistan and rotation bars

Precedence
- Next (higher): Somalia Medal
- Next (lower): General Campaign Star

The South-West Asia Service Medal (French: Médaille du service en Asie du Sud-Ouest) is a campaign medal created in 2002 by the Canadian monarch-in-Council to recognize members of the Canadian Forces who had directly participated in efforts to combat terrorism in Southwest Asia following the Al-Qaeda attacks on the United States in 2001. It is, within the Canadian system of honours, the fifth highest of the war and operational service medals.

== Design ==
Designed by Carl Gauthier and Fraser Herald Cathy Bursey-Sabourin, the South-West Asia Service Medal is in the form of a 36-millimetre-diameter (1.4 in) nickel-plated gunmetal disc with, on the obverse, the Latin words ELIZABETH II DEI GRATIA REGINA (Elizabeth II, by the Grace of God, Queen) and, separated by maple leaves, CANADA, all surrounding an effigy of Queen Elizabeth II wearing the George IV State Diadem, symbolizing her roles as both fount of honour and Commander-in-Chief of the Canadian Forces. On the reverse is a depiction of the Lernaean Hydra transfixed by a Canadian sword, all circumscribed by the words ADVERSUS MALUM PUGNAMUS (we are fighting evil).

This medallion is worn at the left chest, suspended on a 31.8-millimetre-wide ribbon coloured with vertical stripes in tan (representing the theatre of operations), red (recalling the blood spilled on 11 September 2001), and black (evoking the shock of the attacks on New York and Washington), symmetrically flanking a white central stripe (indicating peace). Should an individual already possessing a South-West Asia Service Medal be awarded the medal bar for combat service, he or she is granted a clasp—in nickel-plated gunmetal with raised edges and bearing the word AFGHANISTAN—for wear on the ribbon from which the original medal is suspended.

== Eligibility and allocation ==
On 6 August 2002, Queen Elizabeth II, on the advice of her Cabinet under Prime Minister Jean Chrétien, created the South-West Asia Service Medal to recognize members of the Canadian Forces who had provided support in the War in Afghanistan. To qualify for the medal, individuals had to have served in operations conducted in Southwest Asia for at least 90 days after 11 September 2001, and those who for a minimum of 30 days engaged in direct combat with the enemy in the theatre of war (which included Afghanistan, Bahrain, Kuwait, Qatar, the United Arab Emirates, the Persian Gulf, Gulf of Oman, Arabian Sea, Gulf of Aden, Red Sea, Suez Canal, and north-western parts of the Indian Ocean) were entitled to receive the additional medal bar; in total, 7,497 medals were issued, along with 7,200 bars.

== Notable Recipients ==
- Harjit Sajjan, Minister of National Defence.
- Russell Williams, Former Base Commander at CFB Trenton (His Military Decorations were revoked following his conviction for Murder and Sexual Assault).

== See also ==
- Canadian order of precedence (decorations and medals)
- Gulf War military awards
