= Canadian Centennial Medal =

1967 commemorative medal by the Royal Canadian Mint

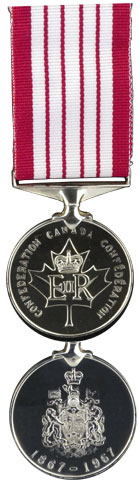
- Obverse and reverse of the medal
- Type: Medal
- Presented by: The monarch of Canada
- Status: No longer awarded
- Established: 27 June 1966
- First award: 1 July 1967

Highlights
- Total recipients: 29,500
- Ribbon bar

Precedence
- Next (higher): Sovereign's Medal for Volunteers
- Next (lower): Queen Elizabeth II Silver Jubilee Medal

The Canadian Centennial Medal (French: Médaille du centenaire du Canada) is a commemorative medal struck by the Royal Canadian Mint in 1967 to commemorate the 100th anniversary of the Canadian Confederation and was awarded to Canadians who were recommended by government, professional, educational and cultural associations, as well as military and protective services, veterans' groups, sports associations, and philanthropic and charitable bodies, for having provided valuable service to Canada. Some 29,500 medals were issued after its inauguration on 1 July 1967, of which 8,500 went to personnel in the Canadian Forces.

The Canadian Centennial Medal was designed by Bruce W. Beatty and is in the form of a 36 millimetres (1.4 in) diameter silver disc with, on the obverse, the words CONFEDERATION CANADA CONFÉDÉRATION surrounding a maple leaf with the Royal Cypher of Queen Elizabeth II superimposed on it, symbolizing her role as fount of honour. The medal's reverse shows the Royal Arms of Canada above the dates 1867 • 1967. This medallion is worn at the left chest, suspended on a 31.8mm wide ribbon coloured white with vertical red stripes, the outermost two wider than the four arranged equally between, each of those representing 25 year intervals, thus totalling 100 years.

== See also ==
- Canadian order of precedence (decorations and medals)
- 125th Anniversary of the Confederation of Canada Medal
