= 1946 New Year Honours (Canada) =

Canadian government recognitions

The 1946 New Year Honours were appointments by many of the Commonwealth Realms of King George VI to various orders and honours to reward and highlight good works by citizens of those countries, and to celebrate the passing of 1945 and the beginning of 1946. They were announced on 1 January 1946 for the United Kingdom, and Dominions, Canada, the Union of South Africa, and New Zealand.

The recipients of honours are displayed here as they were styled before their new honour, and arranged by honour, with classes (Knight, Knight Grand Cross, etc.) and then divisions (Military, Civil, etc.) as appropriate.

== The Most Honourable Order of the Bath ==
=== Companion of the Order of the Bath (CB) ===
Military Division

Royal Canadian Navy

- Rear-Admiral Victor Gabriel Brodeur, CBE.
- Engineer Rear-Admiral George Leslie Stephens, CBE.

Canadian Army

- Major-General Charles Philip Fenwick, CBE, MC, ED.
- Major-General Ralph Burgess Gibson, CBE, VD.
- Major-General Harry Farnham Germain Letson, CBE, MC, ED.
- Major-General Alfred Ernest Walford, CBE, MM, ED.
- Major-General Ernest Geoffrey Weeks, CBE, MC, MM.
- Major-General James Vernon Young, CBE.

Royal Canadian Air Force

- Air Vice-Marshal Charles Roy Slemon, CBE (C.71).

== The Most Excellent Order of the British Empire ==
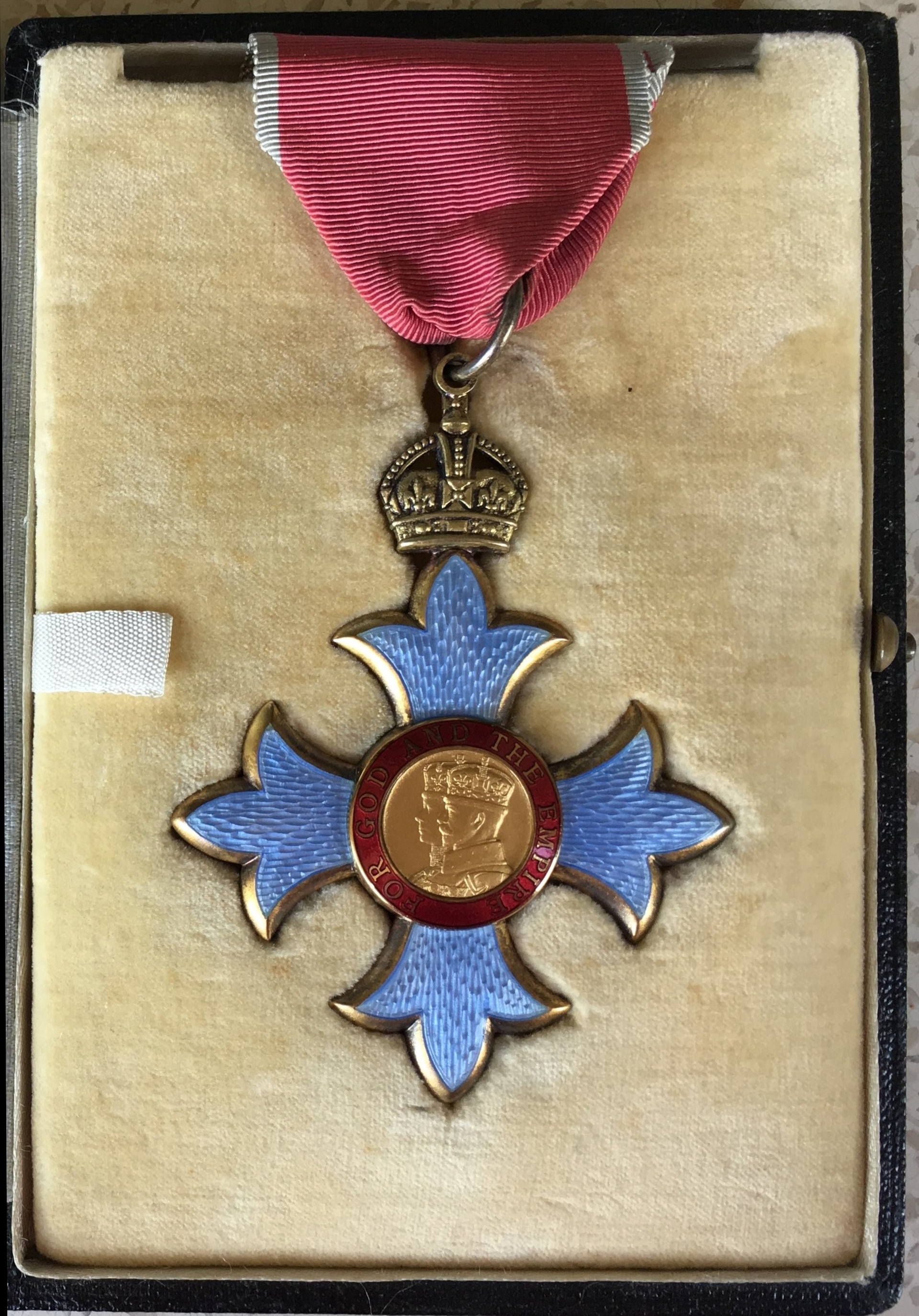
The insignia of a Commander of the Most Excellent Order of the British Empire in the civil division

=== Commander of the Order of the British Empire (CBE) ===
Military Division

Royal Canadian Navy

- Captain Wallace Bourchier Creery.
- Temporary Acting Captain Jean Maurice Barbe Pougnet De Marbois, OBE.
- Commodore Harry DeWolf, DSO, DSC.
- Captain Paul Whitney Earl, Royal Canadian Naval Volunteer Reserve.
- Captain Harold Taylor Wood Grant, DSO.
- Commodore Second Class Godfrey Musgrave Hibbard.
- Captain Bernard Leitch Johnson, OBE, Royal Canadian Naval Reserve (Retd).
- Captain Thomas Douglas Kelly, Royal Canadian Naval Reserve (Retd).

Canadian Army

- Brigadier (Acting Major-General) Daniel Charles Spry, DSO.
- Brigadier Donald Robert Agnew.
- Brigadier Joseph Paul Emile Bernatchez, DSO, OBE.
- Brigadier Kenneth Gault Blackader, DSO, MC, ED.
- Brigadier Noel Osmond Cars.
- Brigadier Douglas Gordon Cunningham, DSO, ED.
- Brigadier John Pollands Girvan, DSO, MC, VD.
- Brigadier Leslie Charles Goodeve, DSO.
- Brigadier Howard Douglas Graham, DSO, ED.
- Brigadier Milton Fowler Gregg, VC, MC.
- Honorary Brigadier Channell Galbraith Hepburn, MC, ED.
- Brigadier Orville Montague Miles Kay, ED.
- Brigadier Hercule Lefebvre, MC, VD.
- Brigadier Sherwood Lett, DSO, MC, ED.
- Honorary Brigadier Ronald Cameron MacGillivray, MC, ED.
- Brigadier Wilfrid Mayor, MC, ED.
- Brigadier James Learmonth Melville, MC, ED.
- Brigadier Ralph Otter Geoffrey Morton.
- Brigadier Henry Grattan Nolan, MC.
- Brigadier Lorraine Patrick.
- Brigadier John Meredith Rockingham, DSO.
- Brigadier Armand Armstrong Smith, MC, ED.
- Brigadier Harold Edward Taber.
- Brigadier William Carson Thackray.
- Brigadier Albert Edward Duncier Tremain, ED.
- Brigadier Wilfred Parsons Warner, DSC.
- Colonel (Acting Brigadier) George Alexander Ferguson, ED.
- Lieutenant-Colonel (Acting Brigadier) Walter Alexander Bean, ED.
- Lieutenant-Colonel (Acting Brigadier) Allen James Creighton, ED.

Royal Canadian Air Force

- Air Commodore Joseph Edouard Allyre Charest (C.1825).
- Air Commodore Henry Gordon Clappison (C.2047).
- Air Commodore William Ewart Cockram (C.1701).
- Air Commodore Russell Charles Gordon (C.133).
- Air Commodore George Norman Irwin (C.450).
- Air Commodore Alan Lawrence Johnson (C.77).
- Air Commodore Neron Frederick Mossop (C.38).
- Air Commodore Geoffrey Stuart O'Brian, AFC, (C.593).
- Air Commodore John Lawrence Plant (C.140).
- Air Commodore Arthur Herbert Keith Russell (C.640).
- Acting Air Commodore Harold John Collins (08246), RAF.

=== Officer of the Order of the British Empire (OBE) ===
Military Division

Royal Canadian Navy

- Captain (S) William Edward Adamson, RCNR.
- Commander (Electrical) Frederick William Robert Angus, RCNVR (Retd).
- Acting Commander (A) John Henry Arbick, RCNVR.
- Commander (SB) Alfred Cecil Bethune, RCNVR.
- Captain Paul Barbour Cross, VD, RCNVR.
- The Reverend Ernest Gordon Blair Foote, Chaplain of the Fleet (P).
- Captain Conan Rudyard Prayer, RCNVR.
- Acting Shipwright Commander Ernest John Gilhen.
- Temporary Commander Ernest Haines, MBE.
- Acting Commander William Charles Halliday, RCNR.
- Constructor Captain Albert Norman Harrison.
- Commander (E) Cecil Irving Hinchcliffe, RD, RCNR.
- Commander (S) Herbert Edwin Hubbard.
- Acting Captain John Rooke Hunter, RCNVR.
- Captain (S) Joseph Jeffery, RCNVR (Retd).
- Acting Commander Francis Bevans Latchmore, RCNR.
- Acting Temporary Captain James McCulloch.
- Commander (S) Donald Robertson McRosie, RCNVR (Retd).
- Captain (SB) Duncan Kenneth MacTavish, RCNVR (Retd).
- Surgeon Commander John Wendell MacLeod, RCNVR.
- Commander (S) William James Marshall, RCNR.
- Commander (S) Ross Alfred Maynard, RCNVR.
- Acting Commander (E) Douglas Keith Miller, RCNR.
- Surgeon Commander Harry Stafford Morton, RCNVR (Retd).
- The Reverend Cecil Henry Moreau, Temporary Chaplain, Class III (R.C.).
- Captain (S) Robert Arthur Pennington, RCNVR.
- Commander (SB) Francis Leslie Philpott, RCNVR (Retd).
- Captain (E) William Walter Porteous.
- Commander (SB) Hubert Ernest Williams Strange, RCNVR.
- Acting Commander (S) George Raymond Razavet, RCNVR.
- Commander (E) Hugh Gordon Seybold, RCNVR (Retd).
- Captain Edwin Alexander Thompson, Royal Canadian Navy (Retd).
- Acting Commander (SB) George Frederick Todd, RCNVR.
- Commander (E) Alexander Victor Wells, RCNR.
- Lieutenant-Commander Richard Paul White, RCNVR.
- Temporary Acting Captain George Arthur Worth.

Canadian Army

- Colonel Hugh Reginald Wriothesley Allan, ED, Royal Canadian Army Service Corps.
- Colonel Dwight S. Coons, MM, Canadian Dental Corps.
- Colonel Archer Fortescue Duguid, DSO, Royal Canadian Artillery.
- Colonel Lorne Miller Firth, General List.
- Colonel Paul Charles Gaboury, ED, Royal Canadian Army Medical Corps.
- Colonel Guy Vincent Gurney, MC, Royal Canadian Armoured Corps.
- Colonel Walter Wallace Johnson, DSO, MC, General List.
- Colonel Bernard Russell Ker, ED, Royal Canadian Artillery.
- Colonel Burt Lake, ED, Royal Canadian Corps of Signals.
- Colonel William Line, Canadian Infantry Corps.
- Colonel John Coming Mackenzie, ED, Royal Canadian Army Medical Corps.
- Colonel Francis Gibson Malloch, MC, VD, Royal Canadian Corps of Signals.
- Colonel William Blight Megloughlin, MC, VD, Canadian Infantry Corps.
- Colonel John George Pope, Royal Canadian Electrical and Mechanical- Engineers.
- Colonel Joseph Gavan Power, ED, Canadian Infantry Corps.
- Colonel James Percival Richards, MM, ED, Corps of Royal Canadian Engineers.
- Colonel Robert Douglas Roe, Canadian Forestry Corps.
- Colonel Charles Perry Stagey, General List.
- Colonel James Gowan Kirkpatrick Strathy, General List.
- Colonel Pierre Tremblay, Royal Canadian Army Medical Corps.
- Colonel Edward James Underwood, Canadian Postal Corps.
- Colonel William Elgin Van Steenburgh, Royal Canadian Artillery.
- Colonel Charles Harold Walker, ED, General List.
- Lieutenant-Colonel (Acting Colonel) Frederick Isaac Andrew, MM, ED, General List.
- Lieutenant-Colonel (Acting Colonel) Ronald Wallace Catto, MC, Veterans Guard of Canada.
- Lieutenant-Colonel (Acting Colonel) Robert Lawrence Franklin, Royal Canadian Electrical and Mechanical Engineers.
- Lieutenant-Colonel (Acting Colonel) Charles Malim Harding, Royal Canadian Artillery.
- Lieutenant-Colonel (Acting Colonel) Ernest Gambier Pullen, Canadian Infantry Corps.
- Lieutenant-Colonel Reginald Walter Kitchener Abraham, ED, General List.
- Lieutenant-Colonel John Alexander Adamson, MC, ED, Canadian Infantry Corps.
- Lieutenant-Colonel Ernest Martin Ansell, MC, VD, Canadian Infantry Corps.
- Lieutenant-Colonel Einar Arnason, Corps of Royal Canadian Engineers.
- Lieutenant-Colonel Frederick George Bird, MC, ED, Corps of Royal Canadian Engineers.
- Lieutenant-Colonel Robert Bourassa, VD, Canadian Infantry Corps.
- Lieutenant-Colonel Paul Brosseau, ED, Canadian Infantry Corps.
- Lieutenant-Colonel Donald Day Carrick, General List.
- Lieutenant-Colonel Hartley Ernest Chater, Royal Canadian Ordnance Corps.
- Lieutenant-Colonel Reginald Van Emery Conover, VD, Royal Canadian Armoured Corps.
- Lieutenant-Colonel Andrew Leslie Coote, VD, Canadian Infantry Corps.
- Lieutenant-Colonel Isabel Cronyn, Canadian Women's Army Corps.
- Lieutenant-Colonel Douglas George Leopold Cunnington, MC, VD, Royal Canadian Artillery.
- Lieutenant-Colonel William Samuel Dingley, DCM, Canadian Provost Corps.
- Lieutenant-Colonel Arthur Henry Evans, ED, Royal Canadian Army Pay Corps.
- Lieutenant-Colonel Peter John Alexander Fleming, ED, Canadian Infantry Corps.
- Lieutenant-Colonel Eugene Joseph Gignac, ED, General List.
- Lieutenant-Colonel John Bayley Hardinge, MC, Veterans Guard of Canada.
- Lieutenant-Colonel (D.O.) John James Harris, Royal Canadian Artillery.
- Lieutenant-Colonel Walter Eric Harris, Royal Canadian Artillery.
- Lieutenant-Colonel Teryl Alfred Johnston, ED, General List.
- Lieutenant-Colonel William Martin King, ED, Canadian Infantry Corps.
- Lieutenant-Colonel Haider Smith Kirby, Royal Canadian Ordnance Corps.
- Lieutenant-Colonel Charles Percival Lailey, General List.
- Lieutenant-Colonel Gordon Ernest Leighton, DSO, General List.
- Lieutenant-Colonel Harry Edward Lemasurier, Royal Canadian Army Medical Corps.
- Lieutenant-Colonel Donald Elswood Lewis, Canadian Infantry Corps.
- Lieutenant-Colonel John James MacKenzie, MC, ED, Royal Canadian Artillery.
- Lieutenant-Colonel Wightman Belyea Manzer, ED, Canadian Infantry Corps.
- Lieutenant-Colonel Douglas James Maxwell, MC, VD, Royal Canadian Artillery.
- Lieutenant-Colonel Jules Mercier, ED, Royal Canadian Army Medical Corps.
- Lieutenant-Colonel Wilfred Merle Musgrove, MM, ED, Royal Canadian. Army Medical Corps.
- Lieutenant-Colonel Robert Gilchrist Peat, Royal Canadian Ordnance Corps.
- Lieutenant-Colonel Willard Gordon Thomas Roach, MC, ED, Canadian Infantry Corps.
- Lieutenant-Colonel Daisy Isabel Royal, Canadian Women's Army Corps.
- Lieutenant-Colonel Hector Denis Saint-Pierre, ED, Canadian Infantry Corps.
- Lieutenant-Colonel Ian Macintosh Roe Sinclair, DSO, MC, VD, Canadian Infantry Corps.
- Lieutenant-Colonel Richard Taylor, ED, General List.
- Lieutenant-Colonel John Earl Turnbull, Canadian Infantry Corps.
- Lieutenant-Colonel Jack Eldon Wilkins, Royal Canadian Armoured Corps.
- Lieutenant-Colonel Arnauld Leonard Wright, Royal Canadian Electrical and Mechanical Engineers.
- Lieutenant-Colonel Lewis Younger, DSO, MC, General List.
- Major (Acting Colonel) Kenneth Hadley Tremain, Royal Canadian Artillery.
- Major (Acting Lieutenant-Colonel) Arthur Ross Gourley, Royal Canadian Corps of Signals.
- Major (Acting Lieutenant-Colonel) Stephen Johnson, Royal Canadian Armoured Corps.
- Major (Acting Lieutenant-Colonel) William Evan Sutherland, Royal Canadian Army Service Corps.

Royal Canadian Air Force

- Group Captain Alan Kinzie Aspden (C.1387).
- Group Captain Harold Hartley Atkinson (C.966).
- Group Captain Wilfred Winter Bean (C.1014).
- Group Captain William Isaac Clements (C.138).
- Group Captain Maynard Leonce Colp (C.960).
- Group Captain Clarence Arthur Cook (C.1388).
- Group Captain Sydney Godwin Cowan (C.158).
- Group Captain Ralph Cargill Davis (C.183).
- Group Captain Henry Russell Dowie (C.884).
- Group Captain Cecil George Durham, MM (C.1774).
- Group Captain John Alvin Easton (C.160).
- Group Captain John Henry Ferguson (C.119).
- Group Captain Cyril Cuthbert Porter Graham (C.1251).
- Group Captain Carl Herbert Hall (C.4417).
- Group Captain Gilbert Ord Lightbourn (C.1871).
- Group Captain Edward Corbus Luke (C.508).
- Group Captain Thomas Crawford MacFarlane (C.1114).
- Group Captain William Vincent McCarthy (C.1807).
- Group Captain Hartland De Montarville Molson (C.1226).
- Group Captain Walter Allan Murray (C.544).
- Group Captain Edward Clark Noble (C.4063).
- Group Captain Valance Heath Patriarche, AFC, (C.602).
- Group Captain Donald Stewart Patterson (C.1393).
- Group Captain Henry Gordon Richards (C.959).
- Group Captain Robert Campbell Ripley (C.189).
- Group Captain Herbert Hugh Carvell Rutledge (C.149).
- Group Captain Frank Augustus Sampson (C.101).
- Group Captain Ernest Clare Tennant (C.1010).
- Group Captain Thomas Carlyle Thompson (C.2667).
- Group Captain Charles Herbert Tighe, DFC, (05111), RAF.
- Colonel Elgin McKinnon Wansborough.
- Acting Group Captain Gordon Livingstone Best (05205), RAF.
- Wing Commander Victor Martin Lynch-Staunton (C.2757).

Civil Division

Canadian Merchant Navy

- Captain Frederick William Burns, Master.
- Captain Eugene Coates, Master.
- Captain John Allan Edwards, Master.
- Captain Clayton Lewis Guy, Master.
- Captain Norman Penrose Hocking, Master.
- Captain David I. Jenkins, Master. (Award dated 13 December 1945 (since deceased).)
- J. Arnold Johnston, Chief Engineer.
- Keith Carson Poole, Chief Engineer.
- Captain Neil John Roach, Master.
- Caotain James Wilson Sutherland, Master.
- James Nimmo Thomson, Chief Engineer.

=== Member of the Order of the British Empire (MBE) ===
Military Division

Royal Canadian Navy

- Surgeon Lieutenant-Commander Harry Lyon Bacal, RCNVR.
- Mr. Gordon Arthur Beanlands, Acting Warrant Engineer.
- Lieutenant-Commander (S) John Richmond Carpenter, RCNVR.
- Lieutenant (SB) William James Carson, RCNVR.
- Lieutenant-Commander (Electrical) Frederick Louis Clairmonte, RCNVR.
- Skipper Lieutenant Eugene Augustus Codner, RCNR.
- Lieutenant-Commander (Electrical) Thornas Creighton Darling, RCNVR (Retd).
- Acting Lieutenant-Commander George Arthur Fallis, RCNVR.
- Acting Surgeon Lieutenant-Commander William Chown Straus Fields, RCNVR.
- Mr. Alfred Edward Goodyer, Commissioned Cookery Officer.
- Lieutenant-Commander John Arthur Hamilton, RCNR.
- Lieutenant-Commander Blake Gilby Hardy, RCNVR.
- Mr. Edward George Hummel, Acting Warrant Writer Officer, RCNVR.
- Mr. Harry Stanley Jackson, Commissioned Engineer, RCNVR.
- Surgeon Lieutenant-Commander Gaetan Jarry, RCNVR.
- Lieutenant-Commander (SB) Raymond Clement Labarge, RCNVR.
- Lieutenant (E) Donald Lome Lindsay, RCNVR.
- Lieutenant-Commander Helen Marian MacDonald, WRCNS.
- Lieutenant Margaret Mackie, WRCNS.
- Lieutenant (S) Edith Lillian Newman, WRCNS.
- Shipwright Lieutenant Frederick Arthur Raines.
- Electrical Lieutenant (R) Harold Armstrong Smith, RCNVR.
- Acting Lieutenant-Commander (S) Edward Harold Sweeny, RCNVR.
- Instructor Lieutenant Edward Dawson Walker, RCNVR.
- Lieutenant-Commander Ernest Frederick Balmer Watt, RCNVR.
- Lieutenant-Commander John Joseph Whelan, RCNR.
- Lieutenant-Commander Mervyn John Woods, RCNVR (Retd).
- Acting Lieutenant-Commander (S) Cecil Gordon Wright, RCNVR.
- Mr. John Augustus Reginald Zanelli, Temporary Commissioned Boatswain.

Canadian Army

- Major (Acting Lieutenant-Colonel) William Pentelow Taylor, ED, General List.
- Major Duncan Andrew Anderson, MC, Royal Canadian Artillery.
- Honorary Major Harry Andrews, ED, Canadian Chaplain Services.
- Major Norman Alexander Armstrong, Royal Canadian Army Service Corps.
- Major Joseph Felix Raoul Audet, Canadian Infantry Corps.
- Major Ernest Eric Bannard, Canadian Provost Corps.
- Major Angus Cameron Barwick, Royal Canadian Armoured Corps.
- Major Edward Horton Bensley, Royal Canadian Army Medical Corps.
- Major Henry Ernest Sydney Blades, ED, Canadian Infantry Corps.
- Major Joseph Alphonse Raoul Blais, Canadian Infantry Corps.
- Major Herbert Selwyn Bogert, ED, Canadian Infantry Corps.
- Major Henry Albert Brain, Corps of Military Staff Clerks.
- Major Rudolph Anthes Breithaupt, ED, General List.
- Major Norman Herman Browne, Canadian Infantry Corps.
- Major Thomas McLeod Cantley, Canadian Infantry Corps.
- Major Harry Hamilton Chace, MM, ED, Royal Canadian Army Medical Corps.
- Major Laurent Chapdelaine, General List.
- Major Marie Jean Georges Antoine Chasse, MC, Canadian Infantry Corps.
- Major Michael Alan Coolen, Royal Canadian Artillery.
- Major Leith Raymond Crue, Royal Canadian Armoured Corps.
- Major John Henry William Currie, Royal Canadian Corps. of Signals.
- Major Cyril Britton Deyo, Royal Canadian Ordnance Corps.
- Major Ross Ernest Doyle, ED, Canadian Infantry Corps.
- Major Frederic Southouse Dupuy, Corps of Royal Canadian Engineers.
- Major David Reynolds Ely, Royal Canadian Artillery.
- Major Frederick William Bruce Fitzgerald, Canadian Dental Corps.
- Major Walter Ross Flewin, MC, Canadian Infantry Corps.
- Major Harold Austen Foweraker, Royal Canadian Army Service Corps.
- Major John Francis Foxe, Canadian Postal Corps.
- Honorary Major Walter Joseph Gilling, Canadian Chaplain Services.
- Major Gordon Mitchell Graham, General List.
- Honorary Major Leo Gratton, Canadian Chaplain Services.
- Major John Leonard Whitney Harris, ED, Royal Canadian Artillery.
- Major Bernard James Highfield, Royal Canadian Electrical and Mechanical Engineers.
- Major Nicholas Ignatieff, Corps of Royal Canadian Engineers.
- Major James Dixon Irving, Royal Canadian Ordnance Corps.
- Major Clinton Egerton Jamieson, VD, Royal Canadian Artillery.
- Major Frederick Cyril Jennings, Royal Canadian Army Medical Corps.
- Major Harold Victor Kerney, MM, Veterans Guard of Canada.
- Major Robert Duff Kinmond, MC, ED, Corps of Royal Canadian Engineers.
- Major John Cunningham Knowles, ED, Royal Canadian Armoured Corps.
- Major Claude Spencer Lea, Canadian Dental Corps.
- Major Valerin Leduc, Canadian Infantry Corps.
- Major Arthur Frederick Leggatt, Royal Canadian Army Pay Corps.
- Major Charles Joseph MacDonald, Royal Canadian Army Medical Corps.
- Major George Henry MacDonald, Royal Canadian Ordnance Corps.
- Major Hugh MacDonald, ED, Royal Canadian Army Medical Corps.
- Major William Keenan MacGregor, ED, Canadian Infantry Corps.
- Honorary Major Arthur Creighton McCullum, Canadian Chaplain Services.
- Major Joseph Earl McGrath, Royal Canadian Artillery.
- Major Malcolm James McLeod, General List.
- Major Hubert Anthony Martin, Royal Canadian Armoured Corps.
- Major Charles Gordon Matthews, Royal Canadian Army Service Corps.
- Major Roderick Brian Meredith, General List.
- Major Bernard Francis Miller, Royal Canadian Army Medical Corps.
- Major John Horace Neeland, MM, ED, Royal Canadian Armoured Corps.
- Major Patrick Arthur O'Connor, Corps of Royal Canadian Engineers.
- Major James Oscar Fitzalan Harley Orr, Canadian Infantry Corps.
- Major Cecil Hilliard Parks, Royal Canadian Corps of Signals.
- Major Louis Paterson, ED, Royal Canadian Ordnance Corps.
- Major Percival John Ralph Payne, ED, Royal Canadian Army Service Corps'.
- Major Walter Howard Renwick, Canadian Dental Corps.
- Major Donald MacKenzie Munro Ross, Corps of Royal Canadian Engineers.
- Major Thomas Michael Ross, ED, Royal Canadian Artillery.
- Major Walter Robert Shanks, ED, Veterans Guard of Canada.
- Major Russell Robertson Sheldrick, ED, Canadian Infantry Corps.
- Major John Henry Reginald Thomson, Royal Canadian Artillery.
- Major Mona Galloway Tomalin, Canadian Women's Army Corps.
- Major Arthur Roy Turner, MM, ED, Veterans Guard of Canada.
- Honorary Major Eugene John Weaver, Canadian Chaplain Services.
- Major James Frederick Westhead, Royal Canadian Armoured Corps.
- Major William Harry Young, DCM, General List
- Captain (Acting Major) Kathleen Margaret Alder, Canadian Women's Army Corps.
- Captain (Acting Major) John Earl Binks, Royal Canadian Artillery.
- Captain (Acting Major) Oscar Cohen, Royal Canadian Ordnance Corps.
- Captain (Acting Major) Murray Irving Coombes, Royal Canadian Corps of Signals.
- Captain (Acting Major) Rosamond Grace Grant, Canadian Women's Army Corps.
- Captain (Acting Major) Eugene Thomas Bernard Hankey, Royal Canadian Armoured
- Captain (Acting Major) Lloyd McEwen Hunter, Royal Canadian Artillery.
- Captain (acting Major) John Stuart Peppard, Royal Canadian Army Service Corps.
- Captain (Acting Major) Charles Campbell Radcliff, Royal Canadian Armoured Corps.
- Captain (Acting Major) Harry Hartland Stevens, Royal Canadian Army Pay Corps.
- Captain (Acting Major) John Cedrick Grant Taylor, Royal Canadian Ordnance Corps.
- Captain (Acting Major) Henry Royal Williams, MC, Canadian Infantry Corps.
- Captain Walter John Frederick Bailey, General List.
- Captain James Watson Bell, Royal Canadian Ordnance Corps.
- Captain Joseph Camille Isadore Rene Boileau, Royal Canadian Army Pay Corps.
- Captain Philibert Drouin, MM, Canadian Infantry Corps.
- Captain Roy Orcean Dulmage, Canadian Infantry Corps.
- Captain Harold Oliver Evans, Royal Canadian Artillery.
- Captain George Edward Grover, Royal Canadian Army Service Corps.
- Captain Elledge Laurie McElmon, Royal Canadian Artillery.
- Captain Jean Jaque Masson, ED, Royal Canadian Army Pay Corps.
- Captain William Abernethy Ogilvie, General List.
- Captain Horace Arthur Payne, Royal Canadian Armoured Corps.
- Captain Kurt George Surbeck, Canadian Intelligence Corps.
- Captain Byron Lester Willis, Royal Canadian Corps of Signals.
- Captain Linton Blair Yule, MC, Canadian Infantry Corps.
- Lieutenant (Acting Major) John Robert Dacey, Royal Canadian Ordnance Corps.
- Lieutenant (Acting Captain) Douglas Lome Gibson, Royal Canadian Army Service Corps.
- Lieutenant (Acting Captain) Frederick Alfred Lypchuk, Canadian Intelligence Corps.
- Lieutenant (Acting Captain) Leonard Matheson Norris, Royal Canadian Electrical and Mechanical Engineers.
- Lieutenant Bertram George Day, Corps of Royal Canadian Engineers.
- Lieutenant (Nursing Sister) Norah Deirdre Ross Hughes, Royal Canadian Army Medical Corps.
- Lieutenant Cecil Thomas, Canadian Intelligence Corps.
- Second Lieutenant (Provisional Major) Joseph Phillippe Paul Lanctot, Royal Canadian Army Service Corps.
- B.95556 Warrant Officer Class I (Sergeant-Major) Alfred Mathew Bennett, Canadian Provost Corps.
- G.44882 Warrant Officer Class I (Staff Sergeant-Major) Trueman Hatfield Clarke, Royal Canadian Army Service-Corps.
- P.27682 Warrant Officer Class I (Sergeant-Major) Charles Tilburne Edward Coleman, Canadian Provost Corps.
- P.296 Warrant Officer Class I (Regimental Sergeant-Major) John Copeland, DCM, Royal Canadian Armoured Corps.
- K.489001 Warrant Officer Class I (Regimental Sergeant-Major) Walter Douglas, Canadian Infantry Corps.
- D.81001 Warrant Officer Class I (Regimental Sergeant-Major) Ralph Alfred Dynes, Canadian Infantry Corps.
- H.51880 Warrant Officer Class I (Regimental Sergeant-Major) John George Fitzgerald, Royal Canadian Army Service Corps.
- D.81154 Warrant Officer Class I (Regimental Sergeant-Major) Cecil William Foam, Canadian Infantry Corps.
- P.38770 Warrant Officer Class I (Staff-Sergeant-Major) James David Hayward, Corps of Military Staff Clerks.
- H.6234 Warrant Officer Class I (Regimental Sergeant-Major) Daniel Illingworth, Canadian Provost Corps.
- U.1528 Warrant Officer Class I (Sergeant-Major) George William Jelks, Royal Canadian Army Medical Corps.
- C.21086 Warrant Officer Class I (Sergeant-Major) Thomas Miller Low, Canadian Infantry Corps.
- C.96173 Warrant Officer Class I (Staff Sergeant-Major) Alexander Edward Macdonald, Corps of Military Staff Clerks.
- B.100033 Warrant Officer Class I (Regimental Sergeant-Major) James McCuish, DCM, Canadian Infantry Corps.
- C.38411 Warrant Officer Class I (Conductor) Laurie Murdoch, Royal Canadian Ordnance Corps.
- P.38063 Warrant Officer Class I (Sergeant-Major) Richard Prette, Corps of Military Staff Clerks.
- P.10080 Warrant Officer Class I (Sergeant-Major) Henry William Slavin, Corps of Royal Canadian Engineers.
- B.73262 Warrant Officer Class I (Sergeant-Major) Earl Edward Stoutley, Canadian Infantry Corps.
- L.12416 Warrant Officer Class I (Regimental Sergeant-Major) Roger Harold Strumm, Canadian Infantry Corps.
- B.584301 Warrant Officer Class I (Regimental Sergeant-Major) Arthur Vidler, Royal Canadian Army Medical Corps.
- P.38137 Warrant Officer Class I (Sergeant-Major) Archibald Horace Wournell, Corps of Military Staff Clerks.
- B.76077 Warrant Officer Class II (Quartermaster-Sergeant) (Acting Warrant Officer Class I, Sergeant-Major) Maurice Thomas Asselman, Canadian Infantry Corps.
- E.22801 Warrant Officer Class II (Company Sergeant-Major) (Acting Warrant Officer Class I, Garrison Sergeant-Major) Dominique Boulay, Canadian Infantry Corps.
- P.38252 Warrant Officer Class II (Quartermaster-Sergeant) (Acting Warrant Officer Class I, Sergeant-Major) Albert Allison Fleming, Corps of Military Staff Clerks.
- P.10192 Warrant Officer Class II (Quartermaster-Sergeant) (Acting Warrant Officer Class I, Sergeant-Major) William Joseph Gamman, Corps of Royal Canadian Engineers.
- P.38159 Warrant Officer Class II (Quartermaster-Sergeant) (Acting Warrant Officer Class I, Sergeant-Major) William Campbell Mundell, Corps of Military Staff Clerks.
- P.40070 Warrant Officer Class II (Quartermaster-Sergeant) (Acting Warrant Officer Class I, Sergeant-Major) John Cyril Potts, Royal Canadian Corps of Signals.
- P.10155 Warrant Officer Class II (Quartermaster-Sergeant) (Acting Warrant Officer Class I, Sergeant-Major) Walter Smith, Corps of Royal Canadian Engineers.
- B.93715 Warrant Officer Class II (Quartermaster-Sergeant) (Acting Warrant Officer Class I, Regimental Sergeant-Major) George Aspinall Stockwell, Royal Canadian Army Medical Corps.
- A.28002 Warrant Officer Class II (Regimental Quartermaster-Sergeant) (Acting Warrant Officer Class I, Sergeant-Major) Frederick Charles Tapson, Royal Canadian Army Service Corps.
- K.90003 Warrant Officer Class II (Armament Quartermaster-Sergeant) (Acting Warrant Officer Class I, Armament Sergeant-Major) Eric Albert Wood, Royal Canadian Electrical and Mechanical Engineers.
- B.485003 Warrant Officer Class II (Quartermaster-Sergeant) Oscar Pryor Ardagh, Canadian Infantry Corps.
- L.247 Warrant Officer. Class II (Quartermaster-Sergeant) Clarence Hardy Barber, Royal Canadian Artillery.
- A.3937 Warrant Officer Class II (Quartermaster-Sergeant) Kenneth James Buckle, Corps of Military Staff Clerks.
- E.15002 Warrant Officer Class II (Company Sergeant-Major) Lucien Dagenais, MM, Canadian Infantry Corps.
- P.27140 Warrant Officer Class II (Mechanist Quartermaster-Sergeant) Alexander Daley, Royal Canadian Army Service Corps.
- P.147 Warrant Officer Class II (Regimental Quartermaster-Sergeant) Joseph Edward Desnoyers, Royal Canadian Armoured Corps.
- B.18003 Warrant Officer Class II (Company Sergeant-Major) Russell David Hamburgh, Canadian Infantry Corps.
- B.66508 Warrant Officer Class II (Company Sergeant-Major) Harold Bennett Hardwick, Canadian Infantry Corps.
- M.16195 Warrant Officer Class II (Regimental Quartermaster-Sergeant) Henry Wilson Hunter, Canadian Infantry Corps.
- F.16152 Warrant Officer Class II (Quartermaster-Sergeant) Reginald Seymour Kingdon, Royal Canadian Artillery.
- C.96386 Warrant Officer Class II (Company Sergeant-Major) Raymond Albert Labonte, Corps of Military Staff Clerks.
- H.26519 Warrant Officer Class II (Company Sergeant-Major) Alexander Flint Mclellan, Corps of Military Staff Clerks.
- W. 13324 Warrant Officer Class II (Company Sergeant-Major) Helen Luella Machnee, Canadian Women's Army Corps.
- W.15064 Warrant Officer Class II (Quartermaster-Sergeant) Millicent Alice Ogilvie, Canadian Women's Army Corps.
- G.32229 Warrant Officer Class II (Staff Quartermaster-Sergeant) Kenelm Digby Sadleir, Canadian Infantry Corps.
- B.48868 Warrant Officer Class II (Staff Quartermaster-Sergeant) John Malcolm Sargent, Royal Canadian Armoured Corps.
- A.37185 Warrant Officer Class II (Company Sergeant-Major) Frederick Charles Smith, Canadian Infantry Corps.
- K. 22103 Warrant Officer Class II (Quartermaster-Sergeant) Charles Henry Peter Trappitt, Canadian Intelligence Corps.
- K.29127 Warrant Officer Class II (Company Sergeant-Major) John Weeks, Canadian Infantry Corps.

Royal Canadian Air Force

- Wing Commander Donald Anderson Archibald (C.2371).
- Wing Commander Harry Clive Ashdown (C.1847).
- Wing Commander Kenneth Edward Ball (C.2274).
- Wing Commander John Ivar Murdock Beddall (C.938).
- Wing Commander Lennox Gordon Bell (C.25773).
- Wing Commander Thomas Frederick Leo Bellew (C.3857).
- Wing Commander Douglas Clarkson Birch (C.2421).
- Wing Commander Stanfeld Tunstall Blaiklock (C.1817).
- Wing Commander Kenneth Strong Blair (C.2611).
- Wing Commander Reginald John Brearley (C.1791).
- Wing Commander Arnold Amherst Buchanan (C.2624).
- Wing Commander Frank Montgomery Buchanan (C.2614).
- Wing Commander James Wallace Burton (C.1830).
- Wing Commander George Jack Harrison Cartwright (C.1503).
- Wing Commander James Eraser Coate (C.7103).
- Wing Commander Hector Nasmith Crighton (C.3906).
- Wing Commander George Alexander Cruickshank (C.2249).
- Wing Commander Linn Dawson (C.2139).
- Wing Commander Stuart Clark Dearaway (C.2394).
- Wing Commander William Falding Duthie (C.3181).
- Wing Commander Donald Robertson Easton (C.4172).
- Wing Commander Arthur Wells Farmer (C.14763).
- Wing Commander Ray Fletcher Farquharson (C.35055).
- Wing Commander George Maurice Fawcett (C.1563).
- Wing Commander John Hoysted Fenton (C.2042).
- Wing Commander Leonard Earl Fingarson (C.2377).
- Wing Commander John Campbell Gray (C.2662).
- Wing Commander John Arthur Hall (C.2379).
- Wing Commander William Charles Henry Weston Hammond (C.1942).
- Wing Commander Geoffrey Paget Hedges, MC, (C.1950).
- Wing Commander Charles Leycester Ingles (C.3286), RAFVR.
- Wing Commander Charles Frederick Johns (C.1743).
- Lieutenant-Colonel Leonard Ernest Kent.
- Wing Commander Leslie Hubert Kottmeier (C.1676).
- Wing Commander Robert Laidlaw (C.5201).
- Wing Commander John Laurie (C.2013).
- Wing Commander James Biggar Lawrie (C.2305).
- Wing Commander Charles Henry Link (C.3055).
- Wing Commander Harold Clarence Linkletter (C.6579).
- Wing Commander Gordon Archibald MacDougall (C.2351).
- Wing Commander Ian Malcolm Mackinnon (C.1888).
- Wing Commander Arthur Howard Kirkman McCallum (C.2587).
- Wing Commander Murdock Angus McNeil (C.2109).
- Wing Commander Edmond Langley Fawcett Meynell (33141), RAF.
- Commander Ian Murray Nichol Mudie, Royal Navy.
- Wing Commander Joseph Raymond Cuthbertson Muir (C.2520).
- Wing Commander John Ellison Nickson (C.2069).
- Wing Commander Frederick Stanley Nowlan (C.1512).
- Wing Commander Richard MacDonald Parkinson (C.1436).
- Wing Commander John Hamilton Norton, MC, DFC, (C.1381).
- Wing Commander Robert McMillan Paterson (C.5200).
- Wing Commander William Stanley Phillips (C.3233).
- Wing Commander Basil Rabnett (C.2819).
- Wing Commander Samuel Burton Rhude (C.2382).
- Wing Commander Donald Frederick Ritchie (C.2051).
- Wing Commander John MacDonald Roberts (C.1679).
- Wing Commander Thorington Blair Robertson (C.8448).
- Wing Commander Gilles Paul Rodier (C.1112).
- Wing Commander Benjamin Henry Rolles (35032), RAF.
- Wing Commander George Ryrie (C.3932).
- Wing Commander William Henry Barnett Shannon (C.2620).
- Wing Commander Howard Clements Spence (C.i822).
- Wing Commander John Maxwell Stevenson (C.1674).
- Wing Commander William Sutherland (C.1820).
- Wing Commander John Duncan Syme (C.2138).
- Wing Commander Arthur Harold Tinker (C.5774).
- Wing Commander Joseph Vokey (C.2194).
- Wing Commander Frank De Brisay Walker (C.9090).
- Wing Officer Kathleen Oonah Walker (V.30001), RCAF (Women's Division).
- Wing Commander John Locke Walmsley (C.2080).
- Wing Commander Howard Lee Watson (C.7722).
- Wing Commander Peter Le Poer Weston Webb (C.1903).
- Wing Commander William Weiser (J.10822).
- Wing Commander James Sydney Williamson (C.1233).
- Wing Commander Ross McCormick Winter (C.11249).
- Wing Commander James Edward Wright (C.1951).
- Wing Commander John Andrew Whyte (C.9021).
- Acting Wing Commander Walter Allen (44338), RAF.
- Acting Wing Commander Raymond Frank Courtin, MRCS, LRCP, (23276), RAFO.
- Acting Wing Commander Stuart Jackson (79252), RAFVR.
- Acting Wing Commander James Athelstone Stedman (73409), RAFVR.
- Squadron Leader Alfred Copland (C.10909).
- Squadron Leader Maurice George Holdham (C.3326).
- Squadron Leader James William Kerr (C.6353).
- Squadron Leader William Howard Lewis (C.2141).
- Squadron Leader Andrew Young McLean (C.13169).
- Squadron Leader William Gilchrist McLellan (C.2342).
- Squadron Officer Helen Ridout Neilson (V.30106), RCAF (Women's Division).
- Squadron Leader Richard Fox Overbury (C.1700).
- Squadron Leader Russel Aylan Prowse (C.14618).
- Squadron Officer Edna May Raynor (V.30187), RCAF (Women's Division).
- Squadron Leader Percy Harold Scanlan (C.5756).
- Squadron Leader Richard Augustus Skuce (C.20485).
- Squadron Leader John Augustine Vila (C.13520).
- Squadron Leader Arthur Martin Ward (C.3246).
- Acting Squadron Leader Alan William Robertson (79817), RAFVR.
- Flight Lieutenant Peter Codner Dainty (44921), RAF.
- Flight Lieutenant John Clinton McGee (C.9733).
- Flight Lieutenant Edward Arthur Fry Reeve (73364), RAF.
- Flying Officer Noel William Garrard (C.9627).
- Warrant Officer 1st Class John Brooks Barks (2052).
- Warrant Officer 1st Class Lawrence Vernon Bury (1357).
- Warrant Officer 1st Class James McIntyre (R.85830).
- Warrant Officer 2nd Class Albert Joseph Phillipe Charlebois (2481).

Civil Division

- Senior Supervisor Joseph Thomas Barrett, Auxiliary Services.
- Senior Supervisor Benjamin Boulton, Auxiliary Services.
- Senior Supervisor John Thomas Carolan, Auxiliary Services.
- Supervisor Harold Edgar Newing, Auxiliary Services.
- Z.502 Supervisor Allen Bert Fitch.
- Z.312 Supervisor Edward Russell Macleod.
- Z.101 Senior Supervisor Francis Patrick Meloshe.
- Z.709 Supervisor John Butler Wadland.
- Richard Arnold Cole, Chief Steward, Canadian Merchant Navy.
- Patrick G. Finlay, Chief Officer, Canadian Merchant Navy.
- Walter Henr Hunter, Chief Radio Officer, Canadian Merchant Navy.
- Captain Harry Jones, Canadian Tug Master.
- Frank Milton Mackenzie, Pilot, Canadian Pilotage Authority.
- John P. Parker, Chief Officer, Canadian Merchant Navy.
- Frank Rosendaal, Fourth Engineer, Canadian Merchant Navy.
- William Warden, Third Officer (now Chief Officer), Canadian Merchant Navy.

== British Empire Medal (BEM) ==
Military Division

Royal Canadian Navy

- Master-at-Arms Samuel George Adams, 2076.
- Sick Berth Petty Officer Roger Phillippe Arsenault, RCNVR, V.25672.
- Chief Petty Officer (Gunner's Mate) Kenneth Raymond Barker, 2700.
- Acting Petty Officer Margaret Anastasia Therese Landry Blesse, WRCNS, W.1239.
- Acting Leading Seaman Reginald George Boaler, RCNVR, V.9716.
- Chief Yeoman of Signals Albert Leo Bonner, RCNVR. V.2293.
- Acting Leading Stoker Kenneth Samuel Bridgen, RCNR, A.5155.
- Acting Chief Petty Officer James Arthur Brown, RCNVR, V.10239.
- Stoker Petty Officer (S) George Wallace Calvert, RCNVR, V.22129.
- Chief Petty Officer Walter Frank Carey, RCNVR, V.22770.
- Leading Cook Robert Granville Childs, RCNVR, V.8844.
- Chief Yeoman of Signals William Henry Clews, RCNVR, V.7446.
- Acting Chief Yeoman of Signals Roy William Collins, RCNVR, V.5322.
- Petty Officer Telegraphist Cecil Scott Dean, RCNVR, V.308.
- Acting Chief Petty Officer Adam Alexander Dickson, RCNVR, V.10361.
- Petty Officer (S) Ernest Frank Drew, X.41122.
- Chief Motor Mechanic Fourth Class Karl Theodore Eisnor, RCNVR, V.25030.
- Acting Stoker Petty Officer Charles Frederick Emerson, RCNVR, V.69549.
- Chief Petty Officer Writer Roland Fraser English, 40845.
- Chief Petty Officer Arthur James John Ferguson, RCNVR, V.13174.
- Engine Room Artificer Second Class Frederick Charles Foster, RCNR, A.2257.
- Acting Leading Seaman (now Acting Lieutenant) George Millar Fyffe, RCNVR, V.6443.
- Yeoman of Signals Lloyd Frithor Goodman, RCNVR, V.9918.
- Chief Petty Officer Writer Griffith Jones, RCNVR, V.30439
- Leading Seaman Edward Hitchin, RCNVR, V.7800.
- Chief Yeoman of Signals Frank Robert Moore Holk, RCNVR, V.8240.
- Engine Room Artificer First Class James William Jenkins, RCNVR, V.55122.
- Engine Room Artificer Third Class (Rigger Foreman) Bordon Winfield Kaiser, RCNVR, V.77291.
- Acting Petty Officer Victor Kendrick, RCNVR, V.5256.
- Acting Leading Patrolman William Frederick Kennedy, RCNVR, V.74731.
- Stoker Petty Officer John Andrew Lain, RCNVR, V.12707.
- Acting Petty Officer Leopold Joseph Lambert, RCNR, B.260.
- Radio Artificer Second Class Leslie McNeil, 40744.
- Chief Stoker Ian Allister Gordon McNeill, 21559.
- Petty Officer Cook Helen Aberdeen Major, WRCNS, W.43.
- Acting Leading Stoker Gordon Murray Morrison, RCNVR, V.11709.
- Chief Yeoman of Signals Victor Frederick Motts, RCNVR, V.9228.
- Stoker Petty Officer William Harold Newton, RCNR, A.4114.
- Chief Petty Officer Robert Hunt Noble, RCNR, A.931.
- Leading Writer (P) Margaret Elizabeth Nyland, WRCNS, W.2619.
- Chief Petty Officer Leslie Arthur Coope Paige, 2584.
- Acting Petty Officer Albert William Palleck, RCNVR, V.16035.
- Stoker First Class Allan McConachie Reid, RCNVR, V.72862.
- Regulating Petty Officer Irene Ridout, WRCNS, W.2563.
- Acting Chief Engine Room Artificer James John Kenneth Robertson, RCNVR, V.30534.
- Acting Petty Officer Margaret Elizabeth Robertson, WRCNS, W.967.
- Sick Berth Petty Officer Karl Schnyder, RCNVR, V.33143.
- Acting Petty Officer William Michael Thompson, RCNVR, V.22185.
- Chief Petty Officer Steward John Anthony Roland Vaillancourt, 40420.
- Telegraphist (So) Theodore Harry Vlachos, RCNVR, V.54941.
- Convoy Leading Signalman Walter Andrew Walberg, RCNVR, V.9363.
- Regulating Petty Officer James Henry Wheeler, RCNR, C.352
- Chief Stoker William Wilkins, 21175.

Canadian Army

- C.94405 Staff-Sergeant (Acting Warrant Officer Class I, Staff Sergeant-Major) Alexander Carnegie Allan, Royal Canadian Electrical and Mechanical Engineers.
- B.94513 Staff-Sergeant (Acting Warrant Officer Class I, Sergeant-Major) James William Hughes, Royal Canadian Corps of Signals.
- C.91032 Staff-Sergeant (Acting Warrant Officer Class I, Sergeant-Major) Gordon Walter George McConnell, Royal Canadian Corps of Signals.
- C.96126 Staff-Sergeant (Acting Warrant Officer Class I, Sergeant-Major) William Faichnie Macmillan, Corps of Military Staff Clerks.
- M.41546 Staff-Sergeant (Acting Warrant Officer Class I, Sergeant-Major) Edward Martin, Royal Canadian Army Service Corps.
- C.89501 Staff-Sergeant (Acting Warrant Officer Class II, Company Sergeant-Major) Walter Miohie Anderson, Corps of Military Staff Clerks.
- W.13407 Staff-Sergeant (Acting Warrant Officer Class II, Staff Quartermaster-Sergeant) Beatrice Ansley, Canadian Women's Army Corps.
- L.18048 Staff-Sergeant (Acting Warrant Officer Class II, Company Sergeant-Major) Alfred Charles Ayotte, Corps of Military Staff Clerks.
- K.70847 Staff-Sergeant (Acting Warrant Officer Class II, Armament Quartermaster-Sergeant) George Francis Bone, Royal Canadian Electrical and Mechanical Engineers.
- D.76575 Staff-Sergeant (Acting Warrant Officer Class II, Company Sergeant-Major) Willie Brinkschulte, Canadian Infantry Corps.
- B.95618 Company Quartermaster-Sergeant (Acting Warrant Officer Class II, Company Sergeant-Major) Arthur Daniels, Royal Canadian Ordnance Corps.
- C.94519 Staff-Sergeant (Acting Warrant Officer Class II, Staff-Quartermaster-Sergeant) William Charles Gates, Royal Canadian Ordnance. Corps.
- C.96360 Staff-Sergeant (Acting Warrant Officer Class II, Quartermaster-Sergeant) Harold Eric Hannum, Canadian Infantry Corps.
- C.2993 Staff-Sergeant (Acting Warrant Officer Class II, Quartermaster-Sergeant) Cecil Charles Jourdain, Corps of Royal Canadian Engineers.
- W.2701 Staff-Sergeant (Acting Warrant Officer Class II, Company Sergeant-Major) Florence Stephen March, Canadian Women's Army Corps.
- B.3699 Staff-Sergeant (Acting Warrant Officer Class II, Staff Quartermaster-Sergeant) Hubert Kingdon Mimms, Royal Canadian Army Service Corps.
- K.42873 Staff-Sergeant (Acting Warrant Officer Class II, Staff Quartermaster-Sergeant) Herbert Ambrose Morris, Royal Canadian Ordnance Corps.
- B.31614 Staff-Sergeant (Acting Warrant Officer Class II, Quartermaster-Sergeant) Philip Henry Parker, Royal Canadian Corps of Signals.
- C.96292 Staff-Sergeant (Acting Warrant Officer Class II, Company Sergeant-Major) William Roderick Relyea, Canadian Intelligence Corps.
- C.90062 Staff-Sergeant (Acting Warrant Officer Class II, Quartermaster-Sergeant) William Lome Roy, Corps of Royal Canadian Engineers.
- F.16212 Staff-Sergeant (Acting Warrant Officer Class II, Quartermaster-Sergeant) Maynard Stanley Sutherland, Corps of Royal Canadian Engineers.
- L.25326 Staff-Sergeant David Nathaniel Anderson, Royal Canadian Army Medical Corps.
- A.34820 Staff-Sergeant Albert Edward Bates, Canadian Provost Corps.
- H.36876 Staff-Sergeant Charles John Bonser, Royal Canadian Artillery.
- W.3309 Staff-Sergeant Bessie Bounsall, Canadian Women's Army Corps.
- W.13253 Staff-Sergeant Alice Rita Cooper, Canadian Women's Army Corps.
- B.35242 Staff Sergeant Carl Franklin Dougherty, Veterans Guard of Canada.
- H.17197 Staff-Sergeant Jack Donniethorne Durrant, Canadian Provost Corps.
- B.102565 Staff-Sergeant George Wesley Haney, Royal Canadian Armoured Corps.
- W.1159 Staff-Sergeant Frances Johanna Gladys Hanlon, Canadian Women's Army Corps.
- M.43574 Staff-Sergeant Warner Heisig, Royal Canadian Army Service Corps.
- C.96054 Staff-Sergeant Wilfrid Joseph King, Corps of Military Staff Clerks.
- K.91676 Staff-Sergeant Frederick Arthur Knights, Corps of Military Staff Clerks.
- M.37259 Staff Sergeant Ian Chisholm McKenzie, Royal Canadian Army Medical Corps.
- K.35725 Staff-Sergeant Edward McIean, Royal Canadian Corps of Signals.
- A.292 Staff-Sergeant George Webster Marr, Corps or Military Staff Clerks.
- A.29172 Staff-Sergeant Daniel Neill, Royal Canadian Electrical and Mechanical Engineers.
- A.22646 Staff-Sergeant Harry Austin Olsen, Corps of Military Staff Clerks.
- K.92048 Staff-Sergearit Ernest Albert Pawsey, Royal Canadian Army Service Corps.
- B.102032 Staff-Sergeant Tom Harold Proctor, Royal Canadian Artillery.
- K.28401 Staff-Sergeant Paul Joseph Lucien Proulx, Corps of Royal Canadian Engineers.
- W.2017 Staff-Sergeant Sadie Margaret Quinn, Canadian Women's Army Corps.
- D.16932 Company Quartermaster-Sergeant Joseph Emile Victor Riel, Corps of Royal Canadian Engineers.
- L.23037 Staff-Sergeant William Thomas Roberts, Royal Canadian Army Medical Corps.
- F.812 Staff-Sergeant James William Ryan, Royal Canadian Army Medical Corps.
- A.57952 Staff-Sergeant Harry Shirley, Royal Canadian Corps of Signals.
- M.3427 Staff-Sergeant Leonard Harry Siddons, Royal Canadian Artillery.
- B.11466 Staff-Sergeant Arthur Charles Smith, Royal Canadian Army Service Corps.
- B.82618 Staff-Sergeant Alexander McGrindle Thompson, Canadian Provost Corps.
- M.41052 Staff-Sergeant Franklin Merton Tilley, Royal Canadian Ordnance Corps.
- W.7015 Staff-Sergeant Nora Winnifred Walker, Canadian Women's Army Corps.
- B.63782 Staff-Sergeant George William Wells, Royal Canadian Army Medical Corps.
- M.25618 Staff-Sergeant John Williams, Royal Canadian Army Medical Corps.
- K.89402 Staff-Sergeant Frank William Wright, Royal Canadian Army Service Corps.
- C.94913 Sergeant (Acting Warrant Officer Class I, Sergeant-Major) Allan Edward McIlhinney, General List.
- K.77224 Sergeant (Acting Warrant Officer Class II, Staff Quartermaster-Sergeant) Thomas Martin Britton, Royal Canadian Army Service Corps.
- H.17501 Sergeant (Acting Warrant Officer Class II, Company Sergeant-Major) Kenneth Charles Brook, Canadian Infantry Corps.
- B.8270 Sergeant (Acting Warrant Officer Class II, Quartermaster-Sergeant) Kenneth James Brown, Royal Canadian Artillery.
- A.104763 Sergeant (Acting Warrant Officer Class II, Quartermaster-Sergeant) Philip Byas Chapman, Canadian Provost Corps.
- F.30792 Sergeant (Acting Warrant Officer Class II, Staff Quartermaster-Sergeant) Robert Joseph Findlay, Royal Canadian Ordnance Corps.
- A.60159 Sergeant (Acting Warrant Officer Class II, Quartermaster-Sergeant) Alexander James Hanes, Corps of Military Staff Clerks.
- W.3279 Sergeant (Acting Warrant Officer Class II, Staff Quartermaster-Sergeant) Sydney Eileen Howden, Canadian Women's Army Corps.
- L.25002 Sergeant (Acting Warrant Officer Class II, Company Sergeant-Major) Donald Logan McLarty, Canadian Infantry Corps.
- F.94109 Sergeant (Acting Warrant Officer Class II, Qtiartermaster-Sergeant) John Reid Moir, Corps of Military Staff Clerks.
- D.26243 Sergeant (Acting Warrant Officer Class II, Quartermaster-Sergeant) Francis Edward Owen, Canadian Infantry Corps.
- M.66385 Sergeant (Acting Warrant Officer Class II, Company Sergeant-Major) John Walker, Canadian Infantry Corps.
- C.96430 Sergeant (Acting Staff-Sergeant) George Arthur Bickerton, Corps of Military Staff Clerks.
- A.57288 Sergeant (Acting Staff-Sergeant) Joseph George Crackel, Canadian Infantry Corps.
- B.28649 Sergeant (Acting Staff-Sergeant) David Arthur Patchell, Corps of Royal Canadian Engineers.
- E.28737 Sergeant (Acting Staff-Sergeant) Louis Bronson Pierce, Veterans Guard of Canada.
- L.7197 Sergeant (Acting Staff-Sergeant) Frederic Ridsdale, Royal Canadian Army Service Corps.
- C.96350 Sergeant (Acting Staff-Sergeant) Harold Percival Rule, Corps of Military Staff Clerks.
- P.27725 Sergeant (Acting Staff-Sergeant) Kenneth William Tatton, Royal Canadian Army Service Corps.
- W.1532 Sergeant (Acting Staff-Sergeant) Lena Mary Thompson, Canadian Women's Army Corps.
- M.50229 Sergeant John Camm Fielder Ashmore, Canadian Provost Corps.
- B.3559 Sergeant William D'Oyly Astley, Royal Canadian Army Medical Corps.
- K.65798 Sergeant Philip John Baldwin, Canadian Intelligence Corps
- C.15562 Sergeant Leo David Beaudry, Royal Canadian Ordnance Corps.
- B.80816 Sergeant William Henry Beckley, Corps of Military Staff Clerks.
- D.91363 Sergeant Frank Berry, Royal Canadian Army Service Corps.
- G.17076 Sergeant Ronald Eugene Bovaird, Canadian Infantry Corps.
- D.82361 Sergeant George Arthur Brickwood, Canadian Provost Corps.
- W.1284 Sergeant Viola Fannie Bullock, Canadian Women's Army Corps.
- D.82283 Sergeant Duncan Campbell, Canadian Infantry Corps.
- M.40997 Sergeant Knut Henning Carlson, Royal Canadian Electrical and Mechanical Engineers.
- C.4200 Sergeant Ross Cronkwright, Canadian Infantry Corps.
- B.101666 Sergeant William Thomas Dudley, Royal Canadian Army Service Corps.
- H.95307 Sergeant Albert Nicholas Durado, Royal Canadian Electrical and Mechanical Engineers.
- L.95632 Sergeant Joseph Fernetz, Canadian Provost Corps.
- W.13581 Sergeant Phyllis Edna Finch, Canadian Women's Army Corps.
- H.20380 Sergeant Lawrence William Fogg, Canadian Provost Corps.
- D.13812 Sergeant Robert Georges Joseph Galipeau, Royal Canadian Army Medical Corps.
- W.6371 Sergeant Bertha Margaret Hinkley, Canadian Women's Army Corps.
- G.29081 Sergeant Gordon Scott McKnight, Corps of Military Staff Clerks.
- B.25639 Sergeant Alexander James McNeil, Corps of Royal Canadian Engineers.
- K.97776 Sergeant Charles Cecil Mavius, Canadian Provost Corps.
- K.44611 Sergeant Kelvin Millen, Canadian Infantry Corps.
- D.16351 Sergeant Alec Ernest Mitchell, Royal Canadian Ordnance Corps.
- G.32963 Sergeant John Ernest Munro, Canadian Infantry Corps.
- B.515028 Sergeant Herman Opperman, Canadian Infantry Corps.
- A.64201 Sergeant Charles Imeson Osborn, Royal Canadian Ordnance Corps.
- L.36217 Sergeant Ian Charles Paton, Canadian Infantry Corps.
- L.19818 Sergeant Harry Rayner, Canadian Infantry Corps.
- K.25844 Sergeant Edgar Cameron Reid, Royal Canadian Artillery,
- L.441114 Sergeant William Bentley Shufflebotham, Royal Canadian Army Service Corps.
- F.79300 Sergeant Donald William Tingley, Royal Canadian Army Medical Corps.
- B.3407 Sergeant John Roland Treloar, Royal Canadian Ordnance Corps.
- G.18453 Lance-Sergeant Joseph Vantassel, Canadian Infantry Corps.
- W.7756 Corporal (Acting Sergeant) Margaret Mary Ida Beaupre, Canadian Women's Army Corps.
- C.89902 Corporal (Acting Sergeant) Peter Muir Campbell, Veterans Guard of Canada.
- W.40239 Corporal (Acting Sergeant) Freda Evelyn Notley, Canadian Women's Army Corps.
- U.1699 Corporal Sidney Shearer Ball, Royal Canadian Army Medical Corps.
- L.32028 Corporal George Henry Burns, Veterans Guard of Canada.
- M.42645 Corporal Joseph Wallace Gladstone, MM, Veterans Guard of Canada.
- W.2311 Corporal Marie Jessie Hebert, Canadian Women's Army Corps.
- F.77079 Corporal Murdock Matheson, Canadian Provost Corps.
- C.6418 Corporal William James Orsborne, Canadian Infantry Corps.
- G.27119 Corporal Richard Watkins, Veterans Guard of Canada.
- A. 56696 Lance-Corporal Edward Clarence Haskell, Canadian Infantry Corps.
- W.2350 Lance-Corporal Jessie Louise Smith, Canadian Women's Army Corps.
- D.166837 Private (Acting Warrant Officer Class II, Staff Quartermaster-Sergeant) Daniel Edward O'Connell, Royal Canadian Army Service Corps.
- M.37302 Private (Acting Warrant Officer Class II, Company Sergeant-Major) Elmer Warren, Royal Canadian Armoured Corps.
- E.33483 Craftsman (Acting Sergeant) Richard Ruttan Harcourt, Royal Canadian Electrical and Mechanical Engineers.
- K.30037 Sapper (Acting Sergeant) Roy Harry Morgan, Corps of Royal Canadian Engineers.
- G.18247 Private Earl Vernon Bartlett, Veterans Guard of Canada.
- B.168369 Private Bruce Albert Cudmore, Veterans Guard of Canada.
- A.114481 Craftsman Edward William Dawson, Royal Canadian Electrical and Mechanical Engineers.
- H.422230 Rifleman Arthur Garnett, Canadian Infantry Corps.
- G.46809 Private Francis Charles Hawkins, Veterans Guard of Canada.
- D.646920 Private Chment Himbeault, Royal Canadian Ordnance Corps.
- A.56985 Private Frank McAiney, Canadian Infantry Corps.
- K.582 Private Hubert Nelson Morey, Royal Canadian Army Medical Corps.

Royal Canadian Air Force

- R.78455 Flight Sergeant William George Alexander.
- R.53665 Flight Sergeant Robert George Alfred Atkins.
- W.314244 Flight Sergeant Jean Muriel Barbour, RCAF (Women's Division)
- 18015A Flight Sergeant Russell Bawden.
- R.142103 Flight Sergeant George Elliott Beach.
- W.301510 Flight Sergeant Eileen Belanger, RCAF (Women's Division).
- R.112547 Flight Sergeant William Edward Bennett.
- R.66267 Flight Sergeant Robert Birchnall.
- R.182231 Flight Sergeant Frederick Stephen Biss.
- W.302170 Flight Sergeant Jill Adelaide Blakeney, RCAF (Women's Division)
- R.91106 Flight Sergeant Charles Campbell Bradley.
- R.72473 Flight Sergeant Herbert Broom.
- R.213143 Flight Sergeant David Alexander Campbell.
- R.116858 Flight Sergeant Joseph Caruso.
- R.50093 Flight Sergeant Charles Robert Cassford.
- R.58570 Flight Sergeant Fredric Roy Chapman.
- R.87987 Flight Sergeant Donald Bullock Church.
- 528651 Flight Sergeant John Clay, RAF.
- R.50148 Flight Sergeant Austin Chesley Cruickshanks.
- R.87040 Flight Sergeant Robert Burns Cumberland.
- R.140395 Flight Sergeant Harold Charles Daw.
- R.52321 Flight Sergeant William Albert Deverell.
- R.90869 Flight Sergeant Cecil Doughty.
- R.92638 Flight Sergeant Delbert Leroy Downs.
- 4317 Flight Sergeant John William Dunn.
- 18090A Flight Sergeant Stewart Eichenberger.
- R.50862 Flight Sergeant Cyril George Emery.
- R.53088 Flight Sergeant Albert Rice Faulkner.
- R.225282 Flight Sergeant Ambrose Flanagan.
- R.65106 Flight Sergeant Charles Frederick Fowler.
- R.92833 Flight Sergeant Howard Webster George.
- R.51847 Flight Sergeant Edward Gifford.
- 9914 Flight Sergeant Victor Ira Gillette.
- R.50103 Flight Sergeant Howard Meek Garfield Gore.
- 775 Flight Sergeant Frederick John Grimwood.
- R.51596 Flight Sergeant Elgin Clyde Hall.
- R.85235 Flight Sergeant William Robert Hawes.
- R.52399 Flight Sergeant Jack Burton Hawthorne.
- 505378 Flight Sergeant Leslie Piiilip Higgins, RAF.
- R.51187 Flight Sergeant Allan Holley.
- 956597 Flight Sergeant William James Cecil Hosking, RAFVR.
- R.56686 Flight Sergeant Harris Goldsby Josey.
- R.82023 Flight Sergeant Edon Blakele Locke.
- R.74233 Flight Sergeant Joseph Dorius Massie.
- R.119752 Flight Sergeant Alexander John McGilvray.
- C.41794 Staff Sergeant George Campbell McIntyre.
- R.71791 Flight Sergeant Robert Ian McKenzie.
- R.82862 Flight Sergeant Joseph William Howard Mellor.
- R.251633 Flight Sergeant David Ernest Moore.
- 7732 Flight Sergeant John Maurice Joseph Morel.
- 6066 Flight Sergeant Harold Henry Muncaster.
- R.84196 Flight Sergeant William Arthur Murrell.
- R.54670 Flight Sergeant Robert Nisbet.
- 2460 Flight Sergeant James Allen Nicholson.
- R.51115 Flight Sergeant Norman Raddon Noakes.
- W.303558 Flight Sergeant Freda John Payne, RCAF (Women's Division).
- R.54846 Flight Sergeant Leslie Charles Pingel.
- R.50844 Flight Sergeant John Brich Poppitt.
- R. 105189 Flight Sergeant Spencer Maxwell Porter.
- R.52489 Flight Sergeant Sidney Charles Stanley Radford.
- R.127141 Flight Sergeant Roger Joseph Lucien Ricard.
- 512127 Flight Sergeant Harold Richardson, RAF.
- 4072 Flight Sergeant John Ross Robertson.
- R.61471 Flight Sergeant Emery Duncan Sharp.
- R.64101 Flight Sergeant Donald Smith.
- R.51711 Flight Sergeant Ernest Smith.
- R.53248 Flight Sergeant Leslie Gordon Smith.
- R.72121 Flight Sergeant Damon Stannah.
- R.54764 Flight Sergeant James William Stocker.
- R.150564 Flight Sergeant Lionel Lucien Tercier.
- 4639 Flight Sergeant Bernard Lewis Thomas.
- R.86234 Flight Sergeant Robert Allan Whyte.
- R.65459 Flight Sergeant Armand Frederick Wigglesworth.
- R.54329 Flight Sergeant Edward Reilly Williams.
- 7568 Flight Sergeant Harris Patrick Yandon.
- 938329 Sergeant Ivor Basil Wilfred Allen, RAFVR.
- 1155033 Sergeant Victor Francis Bateman, RAFVR.
- R.81420 Sergeant Armine Gustav Boas.
- R.267443 Sergeant Rex Wayne Colmer.
- R.53502 Sergeant Rodolphe Wilfred Leopold Des Rivières.
- R.53828 Sergeant Joseph John Leon Ducharme.
- 641160 Sergeant Kenneth George Greenaway, RAF.
- R.138012 Sergeant George Hayworth.
- W.300573 Sergeant Harriett McCleave Hopkins, RCAF (Women's Division).
- R.115078 Sergeant Donald Linwood Magee.
- R.171124 Sergeant Thomas McCormack.
- FAA/FX 78872 Petty Officer Francis John Milnes.
- R.87134 Sergeant Robert Hugh Nelson.
- R.70762 Sergeant William Alfred Patten.
- 1263283 Sergeant Thomas Roy Powell, RAF.
- 753005 Sergeant Paul Augustine Reader, RAFVR.
- R.128978 Sergeant Douglas Ernest Eric Sankey.
- R.149912 Sergeant Charles Wilfred Teasdale.
- 309252 Sergeant Margaret Elizabeth Warren, RCAF (Women's Division).
- 936393 Corporal Arthur Chapman Bradley, RAFVR.
- R.98617 Corporal William Craig.
- R.104109 Corporal William James Johnston.
- 1384605 Corporal James McKelvie, RAFVR.
- W.311868 Corporal Sylvia Lucy Mellows, RCAF (Women's Division).
- R.150953 Corporal George Frederick Nicholson.
- R.176968 Leading Aircraftman Harry Horace Herbert Chapman.
- R.181497 Leading Aircraftman Geoffrey Gosnell Hosken.
- R.195295 Leading Aircraftman Joseph Joffre Touchette Labonte.

Civil Division

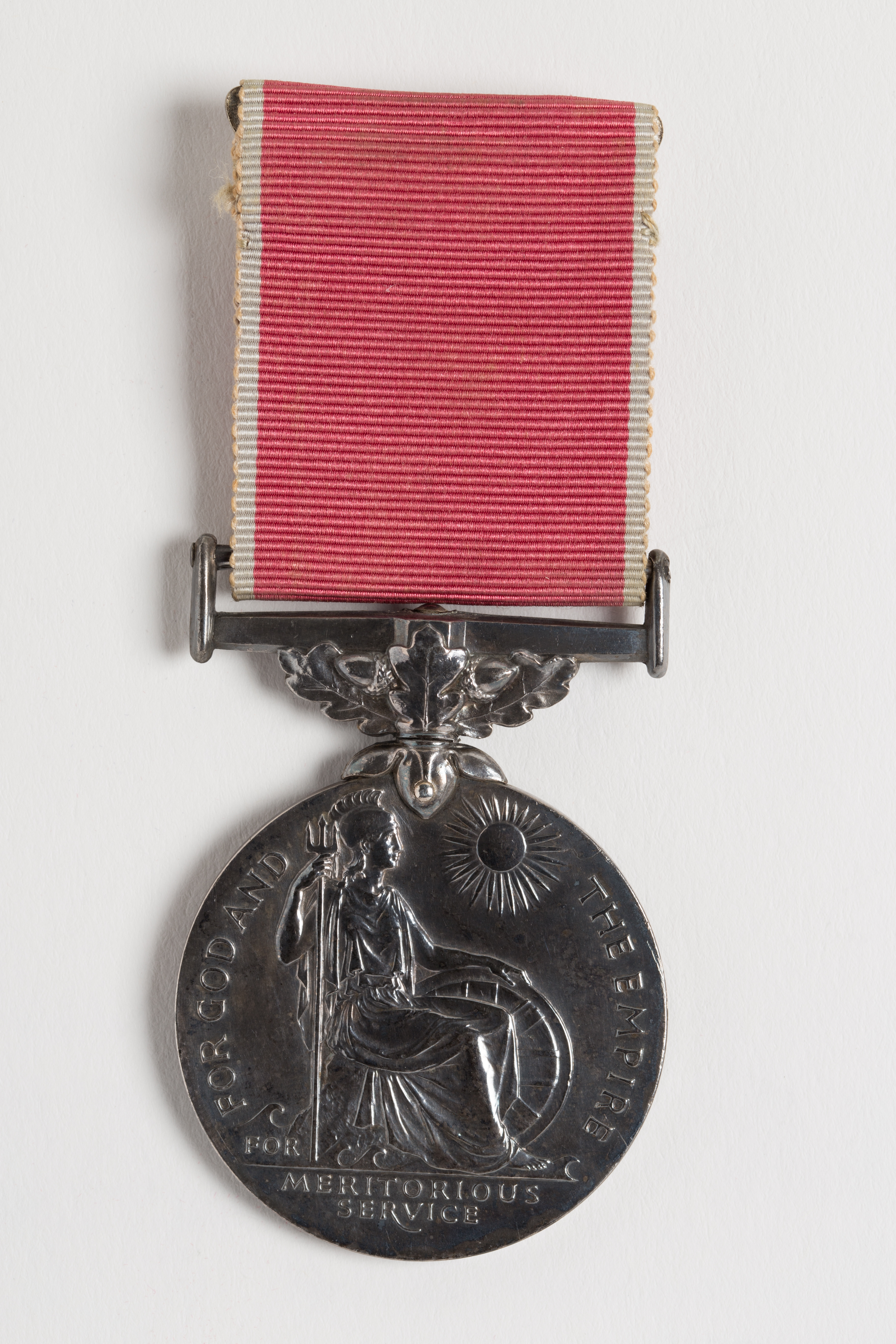
The insignia of the British Empire Medal in the civil division

Canadian Merchant Navy

- C. Barrow, Oiler.
- L. Girard, Able Seaman.
- Robert Korogi, Ordinary Seaman.
- Edgar G. Proctor, Able Seaman.
- Isaac Scott, Fireman.
- John Slade, Able Seaman.
- Douglas William Webber, Chief Steward.

== Royal Canadian Navy ==
=== Distinguished Service Cross (DSC) ===
- Lieutenant Raymond Gardiner Hatrick, RCNVR.

=== Distinguished Service Medal (DSM) ===
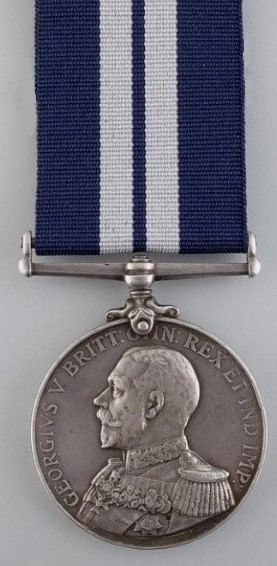
The insignia of the Distinguished Service Medal

- Acting Chief Petty Officer Alexander Leatham, RCNVR, V.10339.
- Acting Chief Petty Officer Patrick Joseph Sims, RCNVR, V.15115.
- Acting Petty Officer Holden Alfred Sinclair, RCNVR, V.30370.
- Leading Stoker Robert William Brown, RCNR, A.1637.

=== Mention in Despatches ===
- Lieutenant-Commander William Arthur Wilkinson, RCNVR (Retd).
- Acting Lieutenant-Commander William Landymore.
- Acting Lieutenant-Commander (E) Robert Cairns, RCNR.
- Acting Lieutenant-Commander (E) Edward John Geddes, RCNR.
- Lieutenant William Rhys Carruthers, RCNVR (Retd).
- Lieutenant Peter John Bligh Cock, RCNVR.
- Lieutenant Thomas Smith Dobson, RCNVR.
- Lieutenant Eric Gardner, RCNR.
- Lieutenant Joseph John Rene George Gratton, RCNVR.
- Lieutenant Arthur Morrell Harper, RCNVR.
- Lieutenant Thompson Albert Johnstone, RCNVR.
- Lieutenant William Burnley Kinsman, RCNVR.
- Lieutenant John McWhannell Leeming, RCNVR.
- Lieutenant William George Morrow, RCNVR (Retd).
- Lieutenant James Patterson, RCNVR.
- Lieutenant Albert Dudley Rayburn, RCNVR (Retd).
- Lieutenant Robert Ian Ross, RCNVR (Retd).
- Lieutenant Norman Gardner Russell, RCNVR.
- Lieutenant James Martin Turnbull, RCNVR.
- Lieutenant (E) Brian Kemp Smith, RCNVR.
- Sub-Lieutenant Louis Henry Howard, RCNVR.
- Sub-Lieutenant (E) Kenneth Reginald McDonald, RCNVR.
- Mr. Hamilton Francis Hindle, Warrant Engineer.
- Mr. Peter Marnock Simpson, Acting Warrant Engineer, RCNVR.
- Mr. Horace Williams, Warrant Shipwright.
- Chief Petty Officer Arthur Andrew Hard, 3267.
- Chief Petty Officer Morton Harry Keeler, 4308.
- Chief Petty Officer Enoch Adeodat Levesque, RCNR, A.642.
- Acting Chief Petty Officer Douglas Harold Caldicott, X.41098.
- Acting Chief Petty Officer John Francis Mead, RCNVR, V. 16039.
- Acting Chief Petty Officer Leslie James O'Connell, RCNVR, V.17598.
- Chief Engine Room Artificer John Paterson Aitkenhead, RCNR, A.1607.
- Chief Engine Room Artificer Alfred Ridler Howells, RCNVR, V.22769.
- Chief Engine Room Artificer John Goodrick Ingham, 21576.
- Engine Room Artificer Second Class William Valentine Smith, RCNVR, V.33077.
- Engine Room Artificer Third Class Roy Percy Garrett, RCNVR, V.12797.
- Engine Room Artificer Third Class John Clement Ward, RCNVR, V.42344.
- Engine Room Artificer Third Class Ralph Winterton, RCNVR, V.12726.
- Chief Electrical Artificer James Ed Brophy, RCNVR, V.25017.
- Chief Stoker Petty, Officer Joseph Edward Dillabough, RCNVR, V.11393.
- Chief Stoker Petty Officer Roy Robert Morrow, RCNVR, V.2023.
- Chief Stoker Petty Officer Robert Semple, R.C.N.22202.
- Chief Stoker David Anthony Williams, D.S.M, 21256.
- Chief Motor Mechanic Third Class James Malcolm Duncan, RCNVR, V.35527.
- Shipwright Third Class Richard Williamson, RCNVR, V.45438.
- Stores Chief Petty Officer John Cameron Whalen, RCNVR, V.25266.
- Chief Petty Officer Cook (O) Ross McIntyre, RCNVR, V.30026.
- Petty Officer Robert George Backus, RCNVR, V.12122.
- Petty Officer Allan Murray Baird, X.2972.
- Petty Officer Donald Adair Cameron, R.C.N R, V.22881.
- Petty Officer Peter Wilfred Doary, RCNR, A.978.
- Petty Officer Strang Lamont Gower Gurney, 3430.
- Petty Officer Allan Lorne Patterson, 3029.
- Petty Officer Roy Francis Wilson, RCNVR, V.12222.
- Acting Petty Officer Sidney George Nation, RCNVR, V.12299.
- Acting Petty Officer George Mertha Perigo, 3788.
- Petty Officer Telegraphist Douglas Corbett, RCNVR, V.5816.
- Engine Room Artificer Fourth Class Douglas Excell, RCNVR, V.31576.
- Acting Engine Room Artificer Fourth Class George Goar, RCNVR, V.24327.
- Stoker Petty Officer William Smith, RCNR, A.4839.
- Radio Artificer Fourth Class Chris Wayne Miller, RCNVR, V.57134.
- Radio Artificer Fourth Class Antony Moilliet, RCNVR, V.49831.
- Radio Artificer Fourth Class James Alexander Shedden, RCNVR, V.34351.
- Petty Officer Writer Hugh Albert Louis Balcome, RCNVR, V.24750.
- Supply Petty Officer Asa Vincent Craig, 21717.
- Supply Petty Officer Leslie Furrier King, RCNVR, V.31494.
- Leading Seaman Richard William Green, RCNVR, V.26090.
- Leading Seaman Clifford Collinson Wellburn, RCNVR, V.36029.
- Acting Leading Seaman Leslie Allison Baldwin, RCNVR, V.12705
- Acting Leading Seaman Verdun MacKinnon, RCNVR, V.46899.
- Acting Leading Seaman Frank Emil Sadler, RCNR, A.450.
- Acting Leading Seaman Andrew James Wright, RCNR, A.3425.
- Leading Coder George Frederick Jacobs, RCNVR, V.267.
- Leading Coder Morgan Howsan McDonald, RCNVR, V.24991.
- Leading Coder Harold Edward Metcalf, RCNVR, V.27624.
- Acting Leading Stoker Evan Jones, RCNVR, V.35210.
- Leading Cook (S) Edwin Francis Tamblyn, RCNVR, V.50299.
- Leading Steward Herbert Eugene Weiler, RCNVR, V.32534
- Able Seaman William Henry Bernard, RCNVR, V.45209.
- Able Seaman Albert Bruce Campbell, B.E.M, RCNR, A.3836.
- Able Seaman John Walter Dance, RCNR, A.2411.
- Able Seaman Hazen Fox Malott, RCNVR, V.49019.
- Able Seaman Walter Martin Masuk, RCNVR, V.11562.
- Able Seaman Walter Ewart Roscoe, RCNVR, V.24089.
- Able Seaman Bernard Francis Thibodeau, RCNVR, V.2731.
- Able Seaman Claude Badham Thornhill, 4515.
- Sick Berth Attendant Donald Muir Martin, RCNVR, V.34213.
- Steward Robert Joseph Burbine, RCNVR, V.87399.

Posthumous Mentions

- Stoker Petty Officer Carlton Joseph Jacques, RCNVR, V.19139.
- Leading Steward James Ralph Conn, RCNVR, V.67835.
- Leading Seaman Robert Russell Knight, RCNVR, V.19140.
- Signalman Terrence Dominic Nelson, RCNVR, V.51108.
- Patrolman Henry Raymond Craig, RCNVR, V.63822.

Commendations

- Acting Surgeon Lieutenant-Commander Lemuel Ewart Prowse, RCNVR.
- Mr. Harold Coxon, Commissioned Technical Officer, RCNVR.
- Lieutenant (C) Diana Spencer, WRCNS.
- Chief Stoker Arthur McKoski, RCNVR, V.52433.
- Acting Stoker Petty Officer Allan Douglas Mclean, RCNVR, V.42253.
- Acting Petty Officer Dorothy Hill, WRCNS, W.1161.
- Acting Leading Seaman Roy David McLaren, RCNVR, V.56084.
- Acting Leading Patrolman Vivian Wilson Owen, RCNR, A.6109.
- Able Seaman Albert Edward Bunn, RCNVR, V.63678.
- Patrolman William Bular Eyre, RCNVR, V.67134.
- Patrolman Hugh Marriott Martin, RCNVR, V.45131.
- Acting Able Seaman Joseph George Arthur Raymond Le Blanc, RCNVR, V.89586.
- Stoker First Class Harold James Marlatt, RCNVR, V.88766.

=== Royal Red Cross (RRC) ===
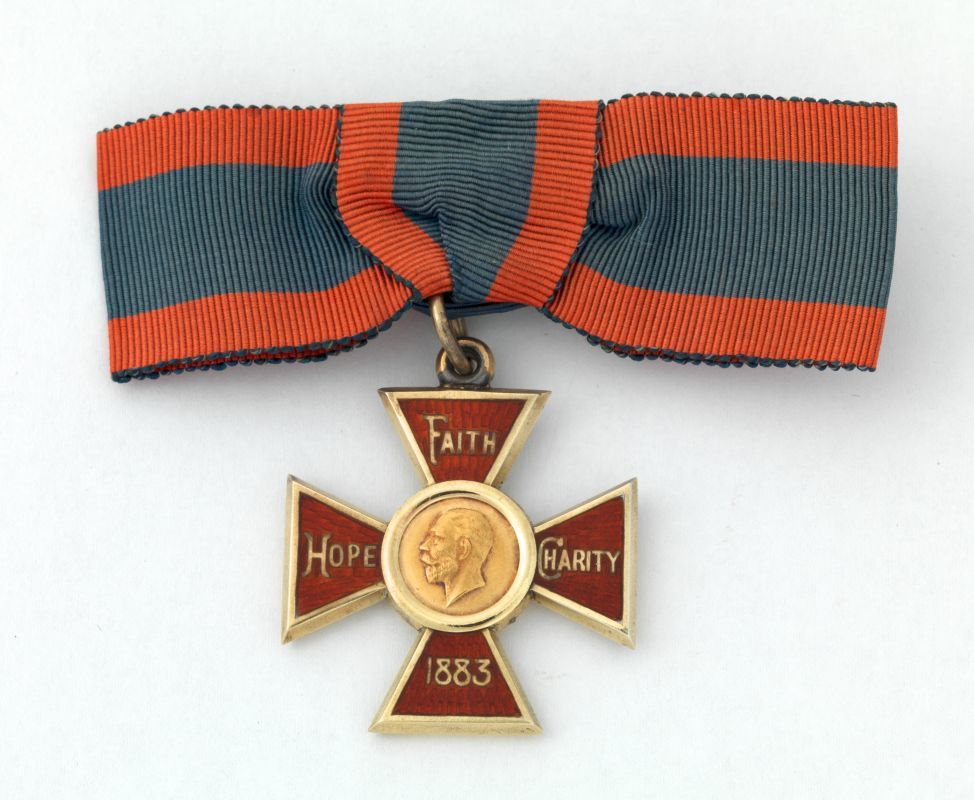
Badge of the Royal Red Cross

Royal Canadian Navy

- Temporary Matron Marjorie Elaine Cowan.
- Temporary Matron Olive Olga Wilson.

Royal Canadian Army Medical Corps

- Major (Physiotherapist) Eleanor Jane Ely.
- Major (Principal Matron) Edith Marjorie Read.
- Major (Principal Matron) Alice Constance Tavener.
- Captain (Matron) Hilda Florence Carson.
- Captain (Matron) Jean Lillian Clemens.
- Captain (Matron) Margaret Dewar.
- Captain (Matron) Isabella Maude Fairfield.
- Captain (Matron) Dorothy May Percy.
- Captain (Matron) Marion Roberts.
- Captain (Matron) Constance Jane Winter.
- Lieutenant (Nursing Sister) Henriette Matte.
- Lieutenant (Nursing Sister) Alice Maud Mary Nicholson.

=== Associate of the Royal Red Cross (ARRC) ===
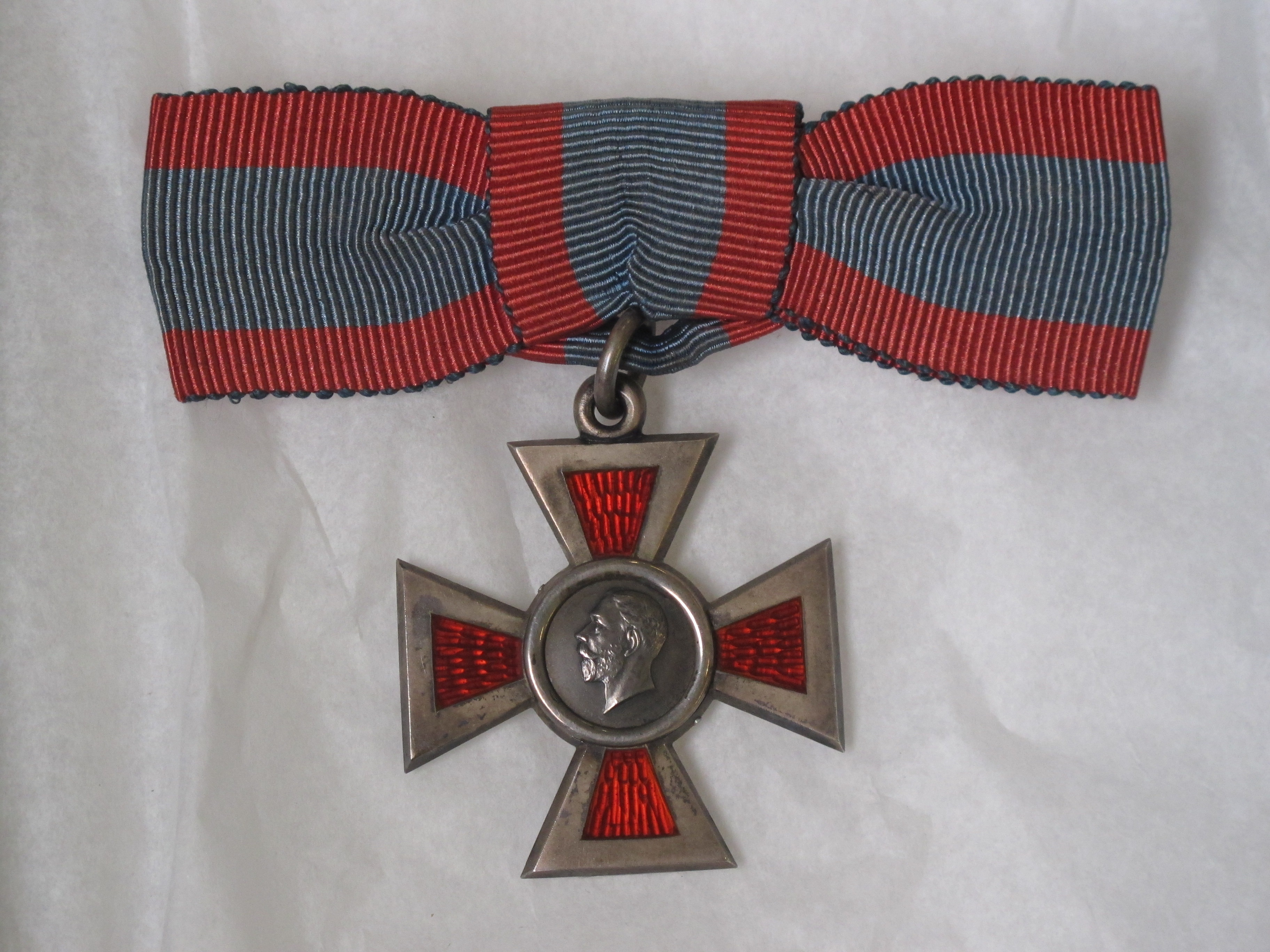
Badge of an Associate of the Royal Red Cross

Royal Canadian Navy

- Temporary Matron Jean Margaret Nichol.
- Temporary Acting Matron (Dietitian) Helen Edna Murphy.
- Temporary Nursing Sister Helen Glendinning.
- Temporary Nursing Sister Margaret Cannon Reid.
- Temporary Nursing Sister (Technician) Jane Kern Ross.
- Temporary Nursing Sister Margaret Caroline Waterman.

Royal Canadian Army Medical Corps

- Captain (Matron) Viola Allan.
- Captain (Matron) Elizabeth Hamilton Alton.
- Lieutenant (Nursing Sister) Ivy Frances Acworth.
- Lieutenant (Dietitian) Nora Mary Attree.
- Lieutenant (Nursing Sister) Margaret Baldwin.
- Lieutenant (Nursing Sister) Anita Borland.
- Lieutenant (Nursing Sister) Evelyn De Gex Chesham.
- Lieutenant (Nursing Sister) Violet Beatrice Cockerill.
- Lieutenant (Nursing Sister) Grace Elizabeth Cowieson.
- Lieutenant (Nursing Sister) Anne Elizabeth Cromwell.
- Lieutenant (Nursing Sister) Nora Isobel Crozier.
- Lieutenant (Nursing Sister) Lily Margaret Dalgleish.
- Lieutenant (Nursing Sister) Marjorie Teresa Dolan.
- Lieutenant (Nursing Sister) Meran Elizabeth Gemmel.
- Lieutenant (Occupational Therapist) Margaret Rutherford Hood.
- Lieutenant (Nursing Sister) Rachel Lachance.
- Lieutenant (Physiotherapist) Kathleen Alice Lake.
- Lieutenant (Nursing Sister) Mary Eunice Macisaac.
- Lieutenant (Dietitian) Margarete Jessie Parker.
- Lieutenant (Physiotherapy Aid) Gwendolen Diana Pinhorn.
- Lieutenant (Physiotherapy Aid) Ruth Ellen Powell.
- Lieutenant (Nursing Sister) Doris Douglas Salton.
- Lieutenant (Physiotherapist) Marj one Berta Spence.
- Lieutenant (Nursing Sister) Hazel Isabell Ussher.

Royal Canadian Air Force Nursing Service

- Matron Margaret Jean Douglas (C.3933).
- Matron Marjorie Elliott Jackson (C.5656).
- Matron Anna Alberta Lamont (C.4229).
- Matron Harriet Butterfield Sabine (C.4599).
- Nursing Sister Eva Blanche Churchill (C.5015).
- Nursing Sister Hazel Eloise Hughes (C.28811).

== Royal Canadian Air Force ==
=== Air Force Cross (AFC) ===
Group Captains

- Fitzroy Cavendish Carling-Kelly (C.172).
- Kenneth Lea-Cox (29188), RAF.

Wing Commanders

- Leon Gustave Gaspard Jean Archambault (C.770).
- Richard Evanor Dupont (37298), RAFO.
- Robert Carl Fumerton, DFC (C.1352).
- Ray Walpert Goodwin (C.1277).
- Roland John Harvey (J.4895).
- George Abner Hiltz (6.805).
- James Archibald Simpson (27210), RAF.
- Harry Edward King (C.1630).
- John Cameron Wickett (C.855).

Acting Wing Commander

- Walter Thomas Brooks, RAFO. DSO (39932).

Squadron Leaders

- Douglas Bruce Annan (J.4554).
- James Harold Baird (J.3260).
- John Whomsley Bellis (J.5502).
- Edwin Charles Brown (70088), RAFO.
- Percival Sydney Calvesbert (J.6860).
- Charles Mitchell Cawker (C.22925).
- Frederick Patrick Clark (J.5488).
- John Harold Cooper (J.7549).
- Wilfred Davis (J.6712).
- Thomas Morley Gain (C.5569).
- Cecil Henry Cochrane Hoseason (C.6973).
- John Earl Jennings (C.2428).
- John Joseph Jordan (C.1092).
- Hugh William Lupton (J.2988).
- Cyril Victor Mark (J.4557).
- John Donald McCallum (J.6952).
- Peter Joseph Oleinek, DFC, (J.4735).
- Einor Ingiberg Swanbergson (C.692).
- Robert William Thompson (C.89503).
- John William Watts (J.7007).
- John Humphrey Young (J.6811).
- George Riley Youngs (J.3106).

Acting Squadron Leaders

- Eric Harrison Francis (43065), RAF.
- Gerald Noel North (46249), RAF.

Flight Lieutenants

- Edward Arthur Allison (J.23595).
- Thomas George Anderson (J.4250).
- John Thomas Brown (C.14813).
- Elgert Burton (J.36530).
- Thomas Robert Delaney (J.14858).
- Lloyd Fraser Detwiller (C.22652).
- Norman Bushell Farrell (C.26200).
- Thomas William Gain (J.14042).
- Paul Albert Hartman (J.8419).
- Harold Cameron Hemenway (J.14064).
- Patrick Barnes Ivey (C.5851).
- Joachim Jaworski (C.28043).
- Dudley Lyell Sait MacWilliam (J.10970).
- William Gerald McElrea (J.2935).
- John David McCosh Patton (J.5111).
- William Nelson Peters (J.22823).
- Cecil William Redfern (J.10352).
- Howard Berwick Russell (J.12466).
- Gordon James Scott (J.21866).
- Elgar Denis Gerard Shea (J.36503).
- Frank Edward Taylor (J.21995).
- Ronald Gladstone Wells (C.22667).
- Kenneth Berkeley Wilson (C.28053).

Flying Officers

- Gordon John Anderson (C.19786).
- Murray Edward Linkert (J.251132).
- Bruce Armstrong Pallett (C.26195).
- Reginald Witt (C.28040).

==== Air Force Medal (AFM) ====
Sergeants

- R.61330 Herman Melvin Hanna.
- R.51573 John Alfred Manley.

=== King's Commendation for Valuable Service in the Air ===
Group Captain

- H. E. Stewart (C.1780).

Wing Commanders

- M. M. Foss (C.1260).
- W. J. Hawkins (C.1751).
- D. D. Rogers (37944). RAFO.
- G. M. Ross (C.635).

Acting Wing Commander

- A. H. Simmonds, DFC, (39396), RAFO.

Squadron Leaders

- D. R. Derry (C.2551).
- C. S. Kent (70362), RAFO.
- P. MacK. Millman (C.3964).
- G. W. Salter, DFC, (41325), RAFO.
- C. R. Thompson (J.4892).

Acting Squadron Leaders

- F. A. Brewster (111974), RAFVR.
- L. W. Collingridge (42196), RAFO.

Flight Lieutenants

- J. L. Barclay (J.10394).
- J. G. Blinkhorn (J. 12694).
- T. D. Bruce (J. 10358).
- J. A. L. Caron (J.7607).
- G. W. Gardiner (J.9557).
- A. B. Gillette, DFC, (J.14754).
- A. G. L. Guernier (132598), RAFVR.
- B. C. Hartman (J.13400).
- R. E. Harman (J. 10610).
- H. H. Hinton (J.21550).
- O. Knarr (J.26078).
- R. H. C. Jeffery (C.1475).
- R. S. Long (1.17582).
- C. V. Mahoney (J.9509).
- L. W. Mansfield (115169), RAFVR.
- A. G. Milne (J. 16623).
- L. R. Naftel (1.5130).
- L. H. Netherton (J.3490).
- F. Pettit (J.22352).
- D. H. Pike (J.23056).
- L. E. J. H. Prendergast (C.1644).
- R. L. Reid (C.10385).
- A. H. Reynolds (J. 13476).
- F. R. Riddell (J.3999).
- W. A. Scott (C.24755).
- G. DeC. Sarre (J.11765).
- T. B. Toye (1.5069).
- H. H. Veno (J.13027).
- L. N. Watt (J.6381).

Flying Officers

- J. B. R. Charlebois (J.43194).
- A. B. Fellingham (C.37957).
- D. J. Higgins (J.46682).
- C. E. Molland (C.39152).
- W. H. C. Wallis (J.2761).
- C. F. Wheaton (J.46662).

Sergeants

- R.76639 E. K. Acorn.
- R.286846 O. S. Hargreaves.

Leading Aircraftman

- R.139151 W. G. Hilbert.

Aircraftman 1st Class

- R.110667 F. Hastings.

==== Mention in Despatches ====
Group Captains

- H. G. M. Colpitts (C.192).
- D. H. MacCcaul (C.76).
- W. J. McFarlane (C.564).
- E. A. McGowan (C.105).

Wing Commanders

- F. Birch (C.2798).
- J. D. Colquhoun (C.4023).
- H. E. Wilson (C.5941).

Squadron Leaders

- L. O. Bradley (C.3967).
- K. C. Cairns (C.4160).
- W. H. Code (C.11547).
- A. S. Foggo (C.10485).
- E. E. Hickson (C.13846).
- A. F. Bobbins (C.20788).
- F. C. Jackson (C.2526).
- T. E. MacKell (C.2915).
- I. A. MacLennan (C.4681).
- H. G. O'Kelly (C.24840).
- G. F. Robinson (C.2895).
- T. Scarffe (C.3637).
- R. E. Slinger (C.3639).
- A. E. Young (C.3320).

Flight Lieutenants

- J. P. Bovard (C.7130).
- J. J. P. Jean (C.40670).
- G. S. MacLean (C.39197).
- R. J. Peddle (C.26894).
- J. Price (C.12145).
- R. L. Simning (C.28454).
- A. Wilson (J.7524).

Flying Officers

- W. F. Olson (J.29487).
- G. G. Smith (C.28402).

Warrant Officers 1st Class

- R.74941 E. Daykin.
- R.62523 C. H. Devine.
- R.88146 J. C. Dort.
- R.57509 W. Wotton.
- R.151767 B. H. Christoffersen.

Warrant Officers 2nd Class

- R.128850 N. R. Cosulich.
- R.56679 A. Graham.
- 1591 W. Greenhalgh.
- 2273A ]. D. Hay.
- 2357 H. A. Pain.
- R.62510 H. D. Schultz.
- R.52559 R. G. Speller.
- R.50910 D. G. Williams.
- R.132091 F. C. E. Williams.
- 18006A E. T. Kerr.

Flight Sergeants

- R.78846 J. P. F. Balge.
- R.89694 A. C. H. Bowman.
- R.71461 J. P. Cole.
- R.81193 E. D. Collins.
- R.50556 J. H. MacD. Craik.
- R.117224 G. B. Kannigiereser.
- 2211 G. J. F. Lagasse.
- 1714 L. W. Langsford.
- R.119164 H. R. Lunan.
- R.109341 W. A. Robertson.
- R.123078 A. H. R. Stevenson.
- R.111328 A. H. Stotts.

Sergeants

- R.54520 W. S. Couch.
- R.50276 G. Desjardins.
- R.154335 I. Levine.
- R.64627 D. A. Macleod.
- R.88024 W. S. Porter.

Corporals

- R.91635 H. Guymer.
- R.175176 W. J. Kuebler.
- R.143565 J. L. Leblanc.
- R.252331 J. F. Roop.
- R.151632 J. P. Watkins.

Leading Aircraftmen

- R.196718 J. E. Boak.
- R.137599 J. W. Denney.

Royal Canadian Air Force (Women's Division)
Flight Officers

- E. C. Russell (V.30152).
- E. C. MacInnes (V.30602).

Flight Sergeant

- W.302173 E. MacL. Boyce.

Sergeant

- W.307552 N. Cappleman.

Corporals

- W.310129 B. O. Bevan.
- W.313300 J. R. Genge.
- W.302316 H. G. Whitman.

== Also See ==
- Orders, decorations, and medals of Canada
- Canadian order of precedence (decorations and medals)
- List of Canadian provincial and territorial orders
- List of Canadian awards
- Commonwealth realms orders and decorations
- Canadian Forces order of precedence
- 2017 Canada Day Honours
- 2018 New Year Honours (Canada)
- 2018 Canada Day Honours
- 2019 New Year Honours (Canada)
- 2019 Canada Day Honours
- 2020 New Year Honours (Canada)
