= 125th Anniversary of the Confederation of Canada Medal =

1992 Canadian commemorative medal

- Obverse and reverse of the medal
- Type: Medal
- Awarded for: Significant contributions to fellow citizens, to their community, or to Canada
- Presented by: Monarch of Canada
- Status: No longer awarded
- Established: 7 May 1992

Highlights
- Total: 42,000
- Ribbon bar

Precedence
- Next (higher): Queen Elizabeth II Silver Jubilee Medal
- Next (lower): Queen Elizabeth II Golden Jubilee Medal

The 125th Anniversary of the Confederation of Canada Medal (French: Médaille commémorative du 125^{e} anniversaire de la Confédération du Canada) is a commemorative medal struck by the Royal Canadian Mint to commemorate a significant anniversary of the Confederation of Canada and was awarded to Canadians who were deemed to have made a significant contribution to their fellow citizens, to their community, or to Canada. Nominations were submitted to lieutenant governors and territorial commissioners, senators, members of parliament, provincial governments, the Public Service Commission of Canada, the Canadian Forces, the Royal Canadian Mounted Police, and various federal government departments, as well as organizations throughout the country, and some 42,000 medals were awarded.

The medal's design was approved by the queen, Elizabeth II. It is in the form of a 36-millimetre-diameter (1 13/32 in) disc of rhodium-plated copper and zinc alloy with, on the obverse, the image of the royal cypher surmounted by St Edward's Crown (symbolizing the sovereign as fount of honour) all superimposed on a large maple leaf and circumscribed with the words "Confederation • Confédération" above and the years "1867–1992" below. The medal's reverse shows the shield of the royal arms of Canada encircled by the motto ribbon of the Order of Canada and ensigned by the crest of the Canadian arms (a crowned lion holding a maple leaf in the right front paw), all above the country's national motto, a mari usque ad mare. This medallion is worn at the left chest, suspended on a 31.8-millimetre wide (1 1/4 in) ribbon consisting of a white central band with blue edging, the band divided by five equidistant vertical red stripes; each stripe represents 25 year intervals, thus totalling 125 years.

== See also ==
- Canadian order of precedence (decorations and medals)
- Canadian Centennial Medal
