= Gulf Medal =

British campaign medal

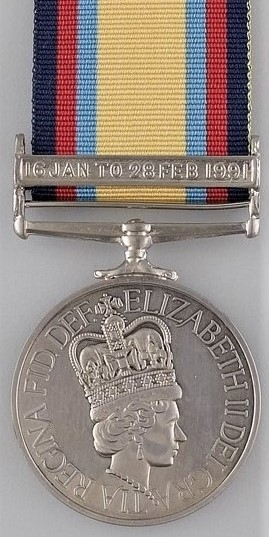
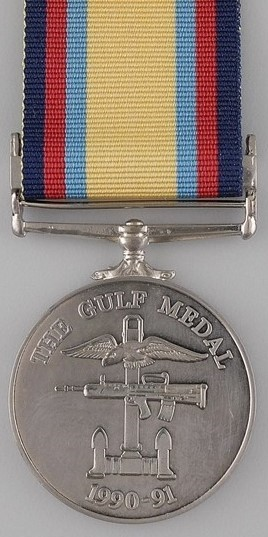
- Obverse and reverse of the medal
- Type: Campaign medal
- Awarded for: Campaign service
- Description: Cupro-nickel disk, 36 mm diameter
- Presented by: United Kingdom
- Eligibility: British forces
- Campaign(s): Kuwait and Saudi Arabia 1990–91
- Clasps: 2 Aug 1990; 16 Jan to 28 Feb 1991
- Established: 1992
- Total: 61,000+ (including civilians)
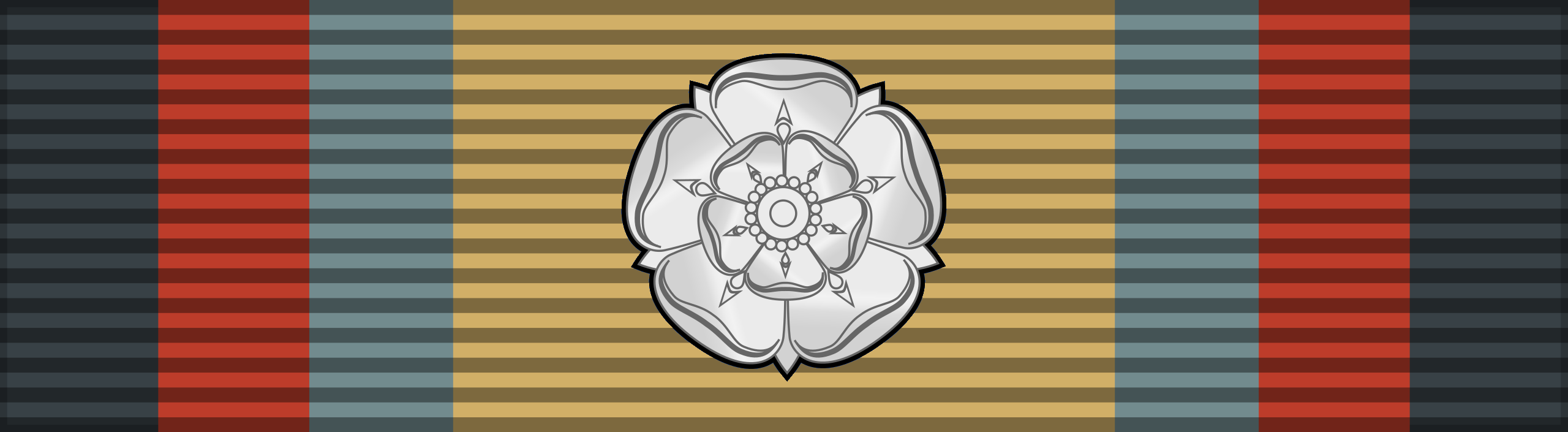
- Ribbon bar: 32 mm wide Ribbon bar with rosette, denoting entitlement to clasp Ribbon bar with oak leaf for Mentioned in Dispatches

The Gulf War Medal was a campaign medal approved in 1992, for issue to officers and men of British forces who served in Kuwait and Saudi Arabia during Operation Granby (the Liberation of Kuwait) in 1990–91.

== Medal ==
The Gulf Medal is cupro-nickel and 36 millimetres (1.4 in) in diameter, with the following design:

- Obverse: the crowned effigy of Queen Elizabeth II facing right with the inscription ELIZABETH II DEI GRATIA REGINA FID. DEF.
- Reverse: an eagle in flight above an automatic rifle superimposed on an anchor, representing the three services, with THE GULF MEDAL above and 1990-91 below.
- Ribbon: 32 millimetres (1.3 in) wide, with a sand-coloured broad central stripe flanked by narrow stripes of dark blue, red and light blue, representing the three services, with the dark blue on both outer edges.
- Naming: The recipients details were impressed in capitals on the edge of the medal.

== Qualification criteria ==
Two clasps were authorised for those who served in Kuwait during the Iraqi invasion, and for those who took part in operations to liberate Kuwait:

- 2 Aug 1990

Awarded to the members of the Kuwait Liaison Team who were in Kuwait on this date, and who were taken hostage by the invading Iraqi Army.

- 16 Jan-28 Feb 1991

Awarded for seven days continuous service between these dates in the designated Theatre of Operations. This clasp signifies service during the actual war.

In undress uniform, a rosette is worn on the medal ribbon to denote the award of either clasp.

- Without clasp

Awarded for thirty days continuous service in the Middle East (in a defined area of operations, including Cyprus) between 2 August 1990 and 7 March 1991.

There was no minimum qualifying period for those decorated for bravery (including a mention in dispatches and a Queen's Commendation), while the period could be reduced for those killed, wounded or taken prisoner.

== Numbers awarded ==
The breakdown of awards to the armed forces was as follows:

Service	Medal only	Medal with clasp 2 Aug 1990	Medal with clasp 16 Jan to 28 Feb 1991	Total
Royal Navy	2,409	Nil	3,942	6,351
Royal Marines	130	Nil	407	537
Army	4,093	46	34,692	38,831
RAF	5,673	20	8,275	13,968
Total	12,305	66	47,316	59,687

About 1,500 civilians including American, Australian, British, Canadian and New Zealand members of British Aerospace working at Dhahran and Riyadh and Khamis Mushayt also received the medal with the clasp 16th Jan to 28th Feb. Most were recently retired members of their respective country's armed forces.

== Related medals ==
Recipients of the Gulf Medal were also entitled to the Kuwaiti Liberation Medal and the Saudi Liberation of Kuwait Medal, awarded to all allied personnel involved in the liberation of Kuwait. British service personnel were granted permission to accept these, but not to wear them in uniform.

Service in the Middle East after the liberation of Kuwait was recognised by the General Service Medal (1962) with clasps Kuwait (service in Kuwait between 8 March – 30 September 1991) and N. Iraq & S. Turkey (service in Northern Iraq or Southern Turkey between 6 April – 17 July 1991).

British personnel could also qualify for the United Nations Medal for UNIKOM (United Nations Iraq–Kuwait Observation Mission), for a minimum of ninety days service between 1 April 1991 – 6 October 2003.

Qualifying service for the Gulf Medal does not count towards the period required to receive the Accumulated Campaign Service Medal.

== See also ==
- Gulf War Military Awards
- The British Gulf Medal 1990 – 91 – Detailed Images
- MoD: Medal eligibility
- MoD: Honours and Awards in the Armed Forces (JSP 761)
