= Kuwait Liberation Medal (Kuwait) =

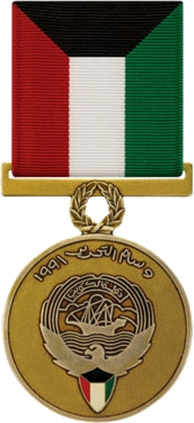
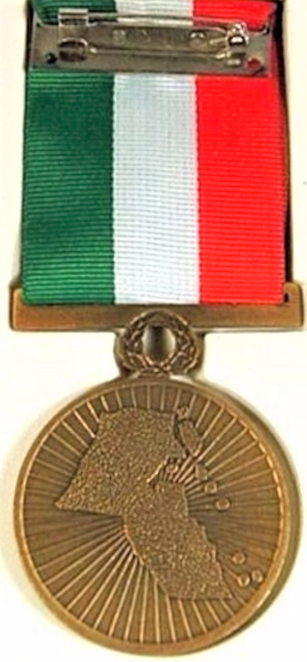
- Obverse and reverse of the medal, Fifth Class
- Type: Military medal Campaign medal
- Awarded for: Campaign service
- Presented by: the State of Kuwait
- Eligibility: Military personnel who served during 1990 and 1991 in the Liberation of Kuwait
- Campaign: Gulf War
- Status: No longer awarded
- First award: 1994 (retroactive to 1990)
- Ribbon variant of the Kuwait Liberation Medal

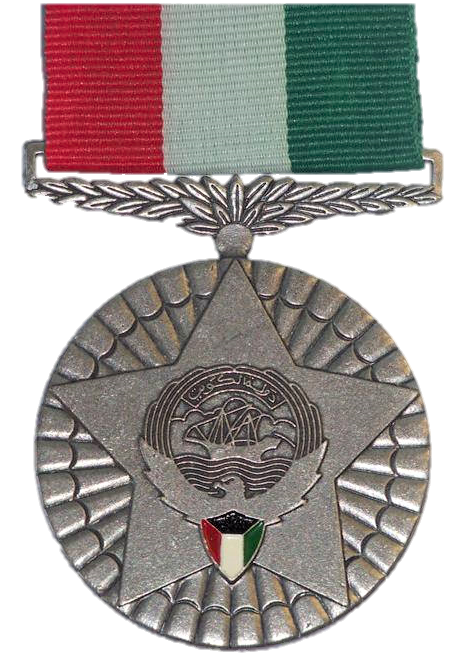
Obverse of the medal, Fourth Class

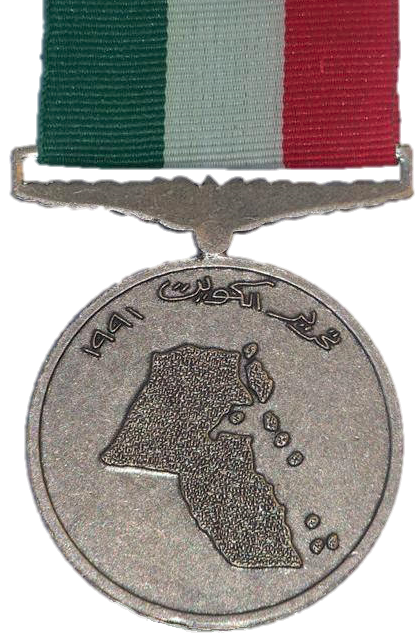
Reverse of the medal, Fourth Class

The Kuwait Liberation Medal (Arabic: وسام التحرير Wisām al-Taḥrīr, English: Liberation Medal, lit. 'Medal of Liberation') is a medal created in 1994 that was issued by the government of Kuwait to both local and foreign military personnel who served in the Gulf War's "Liberation of Kuwait" campaign phase of 1990 and 31 August 1993.

== Kuwait Liberation Medal (Kuwait) ==
=== Description ===
The Kuwait Liberation Medal (Kuwait) was approved by the Kuwait Council of Ministers for award in five classes, generally according to the rank of the recipient. The medal was offered by the Chief of Staff of the Kuwait Armed Forces on July 16, 1994.

A nation of seafarers and ship builders, Kuwait chose as their coat of arms, the traditional dhow. Falconry is the sport of Kings in the Persian Gulf, and the falcon in the arms is seen as a symbol of Kuwaiti prowess. The official symbolism of the colors is that black symbolizes battlefields, white is for deeds, green is for the meadows, and red is for the blood of Kuwait's enemies.

Fifth Class

- Medal: A Bronze medal with enamel, 1 9/16 inches (40 mm) in diameter suspended from a bar by a wreath. The obverse bears the coat of arms of the State of Kuwait. The Coat of Arms consists of the shield of the flag design in color superimposed on a falcon with wings displayed. The falcon supports a disk containing a sailing ship with the full name of the State written at the top of the disk. At the top of the medal is the inscription "1991 LIBERATION MEDAL" in Arabic letters. The reverse side is the map of Kuwait on a rayed background.
- Ribbon: The ribbon is the pattern of the flag of the State of Kuwait and consists of three equal stripes 29/64 inch (12 mm) each of the following colors: Old Glory Red 67156; White 67101; and Irish Green 67189. A black trapezium is at the top of the ribbon drape and service ribbon.
- Intended for non-commissioned personnel.

Fourth Class

- A dull grey metal medal, suspended from a bar engraved with laurel leaves. The obverse bears a fully sized, five pointed star over a pattern of engraved rays with the centre containing the same falcon and dhow emblem as the fifth class medal and the reverse the same map and rayed background.
- Intended for warrant and junior commissioned officers.

Third Class

- A bright gilt medal of similar design to the fourth class medal. The points of the star are considerably rounded and, instead of the rayed background, the medal is pierced between the star and the outer circle.
- Intended for field-grade and equivalent officers.

Second Class

- Medal: A golden star overlaying a laurel wreath. The centre emblem is significantly smaller than for the lower classes of medal. There is Arabic writing above and below the centre emblem. The star is suspended directly from the ribbon, by a ring attached to the wreath.
- Ribbon: Of identical pattern to the ribbons for the lower orders, this now bears a miniature of the centre emblem in gold-coloured metal and enamel.
- Intended for one and two star officers.

First Class

- Medal: A neck decoration of large pattern. Similar to the second class medal but the star is enamelled in with red points and a white circle surrounding the centre emblem. The white circle contains a geometric outer pattern in gold and Arabic writing above the centre. Pierced rays, of differing lengths, lie behind the wreath. The star is suspended from its high point.
- Ribbon: Similar to that for the lower awards but double ended. No miniature emblem.
- Intended for three and four star officers.

== Acceptance and wear ==
=== Australia ===
The Australian government has decreed that its military personnel may accept their medals as a keepsake, but permission to wear them in uniform has so far been refused. This is because the Kuwait Liberation Medal (Saudi Arabia) was approved to wear in uniform prior to the Kuwait issued medal being issued.

It was potentially due to a clerical error within the Australian government that medals were issued to serving personnel who had not participated in eligible operations, due to crew change-outs on participating ships.

=== Canada ===
The Canadian government has decreed that its military personnel may accept their medals as a keepsake, but permission to wear them in uniform has so far been refused.

Four Canadians were permitted by the government of Canada to wear their medals.

=== France ===
France accepted all grades version for their personnel according to their rank at the time of Operation Desert Storm, permission to wear them in uniform has been granted.

=== Italy ===
The Italian Ministry of Defense authorized the wearing of the medal from the beginning, as well as its transcription in personal service documents.

=== United Kingdom ===
The UK's government has decreed that its military personnel may accept their medals as a keepsake but that due to the fact that a UK-created campaign medal, the Gulf Medal, has already been issued, permission to wear the medal or ribbon was denied.

=== United States ===
The US accepted only the fifth class version for all eligible personnel.

Criteria: Awarded to members of the Armed Forces of the United States who served in support of Operation Desert Shield or Desert Storm in one or more of the following areas between 2 August 1990 and 31 August 1993: Persian Gulf, Red Sea, Gulf of Oman, Gulf of Aden, that portion of the Arabian Sea that lies north of 10 degrees north latitude and west of 68 degrees east longitude, as well as the total land areas of Iraq, Kuwait, Saudi Arabia, Oman, Bahrain, Qatar, and the United Arab Emirates. To be eligible, a service member must have been:

(1) attached to or regularly serving for one or more days with an organization participating in ground/shore (military) operations;
(2) attached to or regularly serving for one or more days aboard a naval vessel directly supporting military operations;
(3) actually participating as a crew member in one or more aerial flights directly supporting military operations in the areas designated above;
(4) serving on temporary duty for 30 consecutive days or 60 nonconsecutive days. These time limitations may be waived for members participating in actual combat operations.

The government of Kuwait offered the Kuwait Liberation Medal to members of the Armed Forces of the United States by letter dated 16 July 1994. The medal was accepted by Secretary of Defense William J. Perry per memorandum dated 16 March 1995.

== See also ==
- List of military awards and decorations of the Gulf War
