= Kuwait Liberation Medal (Saudi Arabia) =

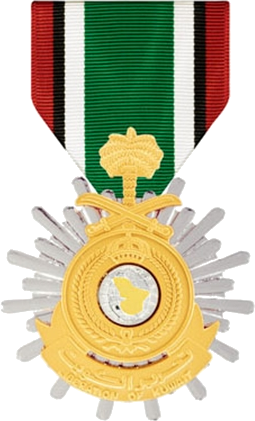
- Kuwait Liberation Medal (Saudi Arabia)
- Type: Military medal Service medal
- Presented by: The King of Saudi Arabia
- Eligibility: Participation in the Persian Gulf War
- Campaign: Persian Gulf War
- Status: No longer awarded
- Established: 1991
- First award: January 17, 1991
- Final award: February 28, 1991
- Service ribbon with device

Precedence
- Next (lower): Kuwait Liberation Medal (Kuwait)

The Naut Tahrir al-Kuwait (Arabic: نوط تحرير الكويت) (Medal for the Liberation of Kuwait) was instituted by King Fahd ibn Abdulaziz of Saudi Arabia for service during the Liberation of Kuwait campaign.

== Background ==
The Saudi Arabian version of the Kuwait Liberation Medal is awarded to members of the Coalition Forces who participated in Operation Desert Storm and the liberation of Kuwait between January 17, 1991 and February 28, 1991.

It is considered rarer than the Kuwaiti version of the medal, because it recognizes service in a relatively short period of time (only a few weeks) whereas the Kuwaiti version of the medal is granted for service over three years. The Saudi Arabian version is also senior in U.S. precedence, owing to its having been authorized for several years before the Kuwaiti version was offered.

== Description ==
The Saudi version of the Kuwait Liberation Medal consists of a silver star of fifteen rounded points (with shorter rounded points between them) surmounted by a gilt medallion which contains a wreath tied at its base and a crown at its top. In the center of the gilt medallion is a silver representation of the Earth, over which is superimposed a gilt representation of the Kingdom of Saudi Arabia. Above the gilt medallion are the crossed swords and palm tree taken from the Royal Cypher. Beneath the gilt medallion is a swallow-tailed scroll with its ends folded back and point upward so they follow the contour of the gilt medallion. On the scroll are the words, LIBERATION OF KUWAIT in English, and the same inscription above it in Arabic.

=== Ribbon device ===
The service ribbon for the Kuwait Liberation Medal bears a gold-gilt device consisting of crossed swords (point up) superimposed over a palm tree. This device is taken from the Royal Cypher. The device is not used on the suspension ribbon of the medal.

== Acceptance and wear ==
=== Australia ===
The Australian Government has authorised the medal to be worn with other international honours and awards after all other Australian medals.

=== Belgium ===
Belgium has authorised the medal to be worn on military uniform with other international honours and awards after all Belgian medals.

=== Canada ===
The Canadian Government has decreed that the Canadian personnel may accept their medals as a keepsake but permission to wear them in uniform has so far been refused.

=== France ===
France accepted the medal for their personnel; permission to wear them in uniform has been granted.

=== United Kingdom ===
British servicemen have not been given permission by the Foreign and Commonwealth Office to wear this medal since a UK campaign medal, the Gulf Medal, was issued. The wearing in uniform of the Kuwait Liberation Medal or its ribbon is therefore forbidden and it is accepted only as a keepsake.

=== United States ===
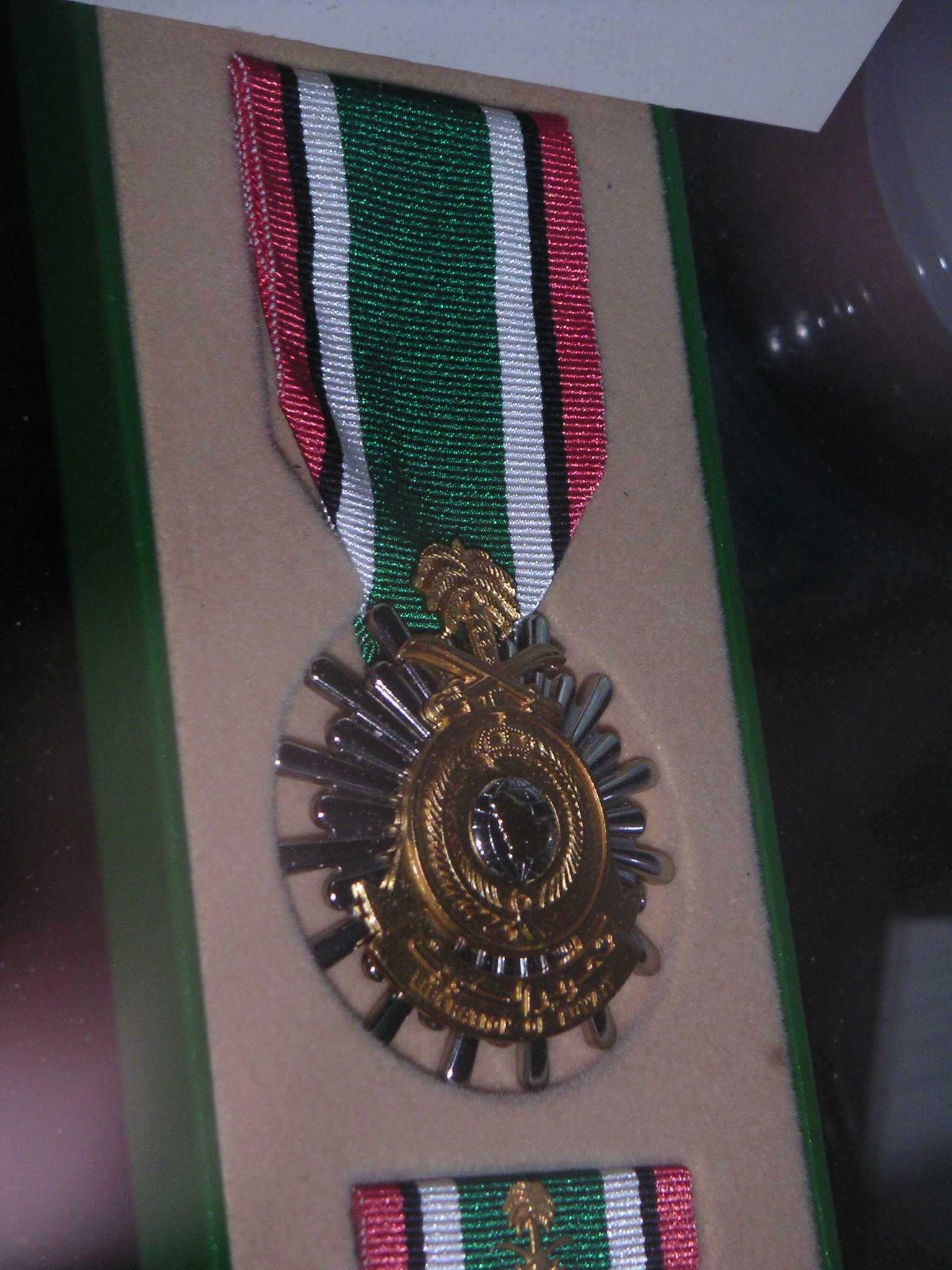
Kuwait Liberation Medal, displayed at the Museum of Florida's Military in St. Augustine, Florida.

Service must have been performed in support of Operation Desert Storm and the liberation of Kuwait, between 17 January 1991 to 28 February 1991. Eligible areas include:

- The Persian Gulf
- The Red Sea
- That portion of the Arabian Sea that lies north of 10 degrees north latitude and west of 68 degrees east longitude
- The Gulf of Aden
- The total areas of Iraq, Kuwait, Saudi Arabia, Oman, Bahrain, Qatar, and the United Arab Emirates

In addition, those personnel must have:

- Been attached to or regularly serving for one or more days with an organization participating in ground and/or shore operations;
- Been attached to or regularly serving for one or more days aboard a naval vessel directly supporting military operations;
- Actually participated as a crew member in one or more aerial flights supporting military operations in the areas designated above; or,
- Served on temporary duty for 30 consecutive days during the qualifying period. Note: That time limitation may be waived for personnel who actually participated in combat operations.

== See also ==
- List of military awards and decorations of the Gulf War
- Orders, decorations, and medals of Saudi Arabia
