= Bruce W. Beatty =

Canadian graphic designer

Bruce W. Beatty CM SOM CD FRHSC
- Born: Bruce Wilbur Beatty; July 6, 1922; Melfort, Saskatchewan, Canada
- Died: March 21, 2011 (aged 88); Ottawa, Ontario, Canada
- Occupations: Graphic designer, airman, civil servant
- Known for: Designing medals, decorations, and military insignia
- Notable work: Order of Canada
- Military career
- Branch: Royal Canadian Air Force
- Service years: 1941 – c. 1977

Bruce Wilbur Beatty, CM SOM CD FRHSC, (July 6, 1922 – March 21, 2011) was a Canadian graphic designer best known as being chiefly responsible for designing the emblems of the Canadian Honours System, starting with the badge of the Order of Canada in 1967. The emblem is the shape of a snowflake – just as every snowflake is different, so is every member of the Order. As of 2004, he had been in attendance at every Order investiture ceremony. Beatty was made a member of the order in 1990. In 1977 he was made a Fellow of the Royal Heraldry Society of Canada.

Beatty was also responsible for creating the emblem of the Order of British Columbia during the 1980s and made alterations to the Victoria Cross for the Canadian Honour System in 1993. He has lectured to the Monarchist League of Canada.

Beatty died on March 21, 2011.

In 2012, Captain Beatty was posthumously awarded the Saskatchewan Order of Merit.

== Honours and arms ==
=== Honours ===
Appointments

- Fellow of the Royal Heraldry Society of Canada (1977 – March 21, 2011)
- Commander of the Most Venerable Order of the Hospital of Saint John of Jerusalem
- Member of the Order of Canada (April 20, 1990 – March 21, 2011)
- Member of the Saskatchewan Order of Merit (2011; posthumous)

Medals

- Canadian Volunteer Service Medal and bar
- Special Service Medal
- Queen Elizabeth II Coronation Medal (1953)
- Canadian Centennial Medal (1967)
- Queen Elizabeth II Silver Jubilee Medal (1977)
- 125th Anniversary of the Confederation of Canada Medal (1992)
- Queen Elizabeth II Golden Jubilee Medal (2002)
- Canadian Forces' Decoration and two bars
- Service Medal of the Order of St John

=== Arms ===
Coat of arms of Bruce W. Beatty

Adopted
Granted by the College of Arms on September 1, 1982. Registered by the Canadian Heraldic Authority on November 12, 1991.
Crest
A white fox (Alopex lagopus) in its winter guise sejant proper winged Or
Escutcheon
Or a tau cross Azure thereon a bee proper
Motto
LOYAL THEN LOYAL STILL
