= List of military awards and decorations of the Gulf War =

This list of military awards and decorations of the Gulf War is an index to articles about notable military awards and decorations given during and after the Persian Gulf War of 1990 and 1991 by the militaries of the countries involved.

== Coalition forces ==
Argentina

- International Operations Medal with Golfo Pérsico clasp

Australia

- Australian Active Service Medal with Kuwait clasp

Bahrain

- Medal for the Liberation of Kuwait

Canada

- Gulf and Kuwait Medal

Egypt

- Kuwait Liberation Medal (Egypt)

Italy

- Commemorative Cross for the Operations in the Persian Gulf 1990-91 (Croce commemorativa per le operazioni militari nell'area del Golfo Persico)

Norway

- Medal for Defence Service Abroad - Saudi Arabia

Kuwait

- Kuwait Liberation Medal (Wisam Al-Tahrir)

This medal was offered to other members of the Coalition forces
Saudi Arabia

- Medal for the Liberation of Kuwait (Nut Tahrir Al-Kuwait)

This medal was offered to other members of the Coalition forces
United Arab Emirates

- Medal for the Liberation of Kuwait (Wisam al-Tahrir al-Kuwait)

United Kingdom

- Gulf Medal

United States

- Southwest Asia Service Medal

== Iraq ==
- Nut Al-Shuja'ah (Bravery Medal), 1990-1991
- Wisam 'Um Al-M’aarik (Mother of Battles Medal), 1990–91
- Sharat 'Um Al-M'aarik (Mother of Battles Badge)
