= Fount of honour =

Courtsmanship, honary of judicial outcome

The fount of honour (Latin: fons honorum) is a person, who, by virtue of their official position, has the exclusive right of conferring legitimate titles of nobility and orders of chivalry on other persons.

== Origin ==
During the High Middle Ages, European knights were essentially armoured, mounted warriors. In feudalism, by virtue of its defining characteristic of subinfeudation, it was common practice for knights commander to confer knighthoods upon their finest soldiers, who in turn had the right to confer knighthood on others upon attaining command. This practice survived into the Renaissance, and by the estimate of British historian Lawrence Stone up to a quarter of the roughly 550 English knights at the time of Elizabeth I's death in 1603 had been created by a single nobleman, the Earl of Essex. For most of the Middle Ages, it was also possible for private individuals to form orders of chivalry; the oldest existing order of chivalry, the Order of Saint John of the Sovereign Military Order of Malta, was formed as a private organization which later received official sanction from church and state.

The 13th century witnessed the trend of monarchs, beginning with Emperor Frederick II (as King of Sicily) in 1231, retaining the right of fons honorum (Latin: 'fount of honour') as a royal prerogative, gradually abrogating the right of knights to elevate their esquires to knighthood. After the end of feudalism and the rise of the nation-state, orders and knighthoods, along with titles of nobility (in the case of monarchies), became the domain of the monarchs (heads of state) to reward their loyal subjects (citizens) – in other words, the heads of state became their nations' "fountains of honour".

Many of the old-style military knights resented what they considered to be a royal encroachment on their independence. The British social anthropologist, Julian A. Pitt-Rivers, noted that "while the sovereign is the 'fount of honour' in one sense, he is also the enemy of honour in another, since he claims to arbitrate in regard to it." By the early thirteenth century, when an unknown author composed L'Histoire de Guillaume le Marechal (a verse biography of William Marshal, 1st Earl of Pembroke, often regarded as the greatest medieval English knight), Richard W. Kaeuper notes that "the author bemoans the fact that, in his day, the spirit of chivalry has been imprisoned; the life of the knight errant, he charges, has been reduced to that of the litigant in courts."

== Legality of honours today ==
The question whether an order is a legitimate chivalric order or a self-styled order coincides with the subject of the fons honorum. A legitimate fount of honour is a person or entity who holds sovereignty when the order is awarded. Ultimately, it is the authority of the state, whether exercised by a reigning monarch or the president of a republic, that distinguishes orders of chivalry from private organizations. In Canada, for example, other persons – whether commoners, knights or nobles – no longer have the right to confer titles of nobility, knighthoods or orders of chivalry on others.

The official website of the British monarchy states: "As the 'fountain of honour' in the United Kingdom, The [Monarch] has the sole right of conferring all titles of honour, including life peerages, knighthoods and gallantry awards." Some private societies in the United Kingdom (such as the Royal Humane Society) have permission from the monarch to award medals which may be worn by those in uniform provided the private society's medal is worn on the right-side rather than the usual left. In Spain the fount of honour is King Felipe VI as the head of state.

In France, only decorations recognised by the Grand Chancery of the Legion of Honour may be worn publicly, and permission must be sought and granted to wear any foreign awards or decorations. Dynastic orders are prohibited unless the dynasty in question is currently recognised as sovereign. (For example, the Royal Victorian Order is explicitly recognised, whereas the Order of Saints Maurice and Lazarus is not.) Failure to comply is punishable by law. A non-exhaustive list of collectively authorised orders is published by the government.

These two dispositions are meant to protect the ensemble of authentic national and foreign distinctions by attempting to prevent the attire of fake decorations. These may stem from territorial entities which have not acceded to sovereignty or even from countries, nations, empires or kingdoms that are the pure and simple products of someone's overactive imagination, a fan of fiction or even a megalomaniac, if not purely mercantile acts or even the patent intention to abuse and swindle others.

The President of the Portuguese Republic has inherited the duties of fount of honour from the Portuguese monarchs, since, unlike titles of nobility, the Portuguese orders of chivalry were not extinguished with the Republican Revolution in 1910. The current Constitution of Portugal alternatively styles the President as the "Grand Master of the Portuguese Honorific Orders" (Portuguese: Grão-Mestre das Ordens Honoríficas Portuguesas); in this capacity, the President can wear as a private insignia the Sash of the Three Orders, which has become a symbol of the Portuguese presidential magistracy.

The Papal Orders of Knighthood comprise five orders awarded directly by the Holy See and two others which it 'recognises and supports': the Sovereign Military Order of Malta and the Order of the Holy Sepulchre. In response to queries regarding the Catholic Church's relationship to a large number of self-proclaimed Roman Catholic chivalric orders, the Holy See issued a statement in 2012 stating that any body other than its own seven approved orders, 'whether of recent origin or mediaeval foundation, are not recognised by the Holy See' and that 'the Holy See does not guarantee their historical or juridical legitimacy, their ends or organisational structures... to prevent the continuation of abuses which may result in harm to people of good faith, the Holy See confirms that it attributes absolutely no value whatsoever to certificates of membership or insignia issued by these groups, and it considers inappropriate the use of churches or chapels for their so-called "ceremonies of investiture".'

== See also ==
- Australian honours system
- British honours system
- Canadian honours system
- Titles of nobility
