= Canadian honours order of wearing =

The order of wear for decorations and medals of Canada is published by the Governor General of Canada.

== Awards of valour ==
| Ribbon | Honour | Post-nominal letters |
|---|---|---|
| | Recipient of the Victoria Cross | VC |
| | Recipient of the Cross of Valour | CV |

== National orders ==
| Ribbon | Honour | Post-nominal letters |
|---|---|---|
| | Member of the Order of Merit | OM |
| | Companion of the Order of Canada | CC |
| | Officer of the Order of Canada | OC |
| | Member of the Order of Canada | CM |
| | Commander of the Order of Military Merit | CMM |
| | Commander of the Order of Merit of the Police Forces | COM |
| | Commander of the Royal Victorian Order | CVO |
| | Officer of the Order of Military Merit | OMM |
| | Officer of the Order of Merit of the Police Forces | OOM |
| | Lieutenant of the Royal Victorian Order | LVO |
| | Member of the Order of Military Merit | MMM |
| | Member of the Order of Merit of the Police Forces | MOM |
| | Member of the Royal Victorian Order | MVO |
| | Bailiff/Dame Grand Cross of the Order of St John | GCStJ (Note: Post-nominal letters for this order are used only within the order itself.) |
| | Knight/Dame of the Order of St John | KStJ/DStJ |
| | Commander of the Order of St John | CStJ |
| | Officer of the Order of St John | OStJ |
| | Member of the Order of St John | MStJ |

== Provincial orders ==
| Ribbon | Honour | Post-nominal letters |
|---|---|---|
| | Grand Officer of the National Order of Quebec | GOQ |
| | Officer of the National Order of Quebec | OQ |
| | Knight of the National Order of Quebec | CQ |
| | Member of the Saskatchewan Order of Merit | SOM |
| | Member of the Order of Ontario | OOnt |
| | Member of the Order of British Columbia | OBC |
| | Member of the Alberta Order of Excellence | AOE |
| | Member of the Order of Prince Edward Island | OPEI |
| | Member of the Order of Manitoba | OM |
| | Member of the Order of New Brunswick | ONB |
| | Member of the Order of Nova Scotia | ONS |
| | Member of the Order of Newfoundland and Labrador | ONL |

== Territorial orders ==
| Ribbon | Honour | Post-nominal letters |
|---|---|---|
| | Member of the Order of Nunavut | ONu |
| | Member of the Order of the Northwest Territories | ONWT |
| | Member of the Order of Yukon | OY |

== National decorations ==
| Ribbon | Honour | Post-nominal letters |
|---|---|---|
| | Recipient of the Star of Military Valour | SMV |
| | Recipient of the Star of Courage | SC |
| | Recipient of the Meritorious Service Cross (military division) | MSC |
| | Recipient of the Meritorious Service Cross (civilian division) | MSC |
| | Recipient of the Medal of Military Valour | MMV |
| | Recipient of the Medal of Bravery | MB |
| | Recipient of the Meritorious Service Medal (military division) | MSM |
| | Recipient of the Meritorious Service Medal (civil division) | MSM |
| | Recipient of the Royal Victorian Medal | RVM |

=== National decorations not included in order of precedence ===
The Royal Victorian Chain a personal award of the monarch that is of high status, but does not confer on the recipient any title or post-nominal letters, nor is it included in the order-in-council setting out the order of precedence for the wear of honours, decorations, and medals.

| Ribbon | Honour | Post-nominal letters |
|---|---|---|
| | Recipient of the Royal Victorian Chain | |

== National medals ==
| Ribbon | Honour |
|---|---|
| | Recipient of the Sacrifice Medal |

=== National medals not included in order of precedence ===
Certain national medals are recognized as a part of the Canadian honours system but are not included in the Order in Council that sets out the precedence of honours, decorations, and medals in Canada.

| Ribbon | Honour |
|---|---|
| | Recipient of the Memorial Cross |

== War and operational service medals ==
| Ribbon | Honour |
|---|---|
| | Recipient of the Korea Medal |
| | Recipient of the Canadian Volunteer Service Medal for Korea |
| | Recipient of the Gulf and Kuwait Medal |
| | Recipient of the Somalia Medal |
| | Recipient of the South-West Asia Service Medal |
| | Recipient of the General Campaign Star |
| | Allied Force |
| | South-West Asia |
| | Expedition |
| | Recipient of the General Service Medal |
| | Allied Force |
| | South-West Asia |
| | Expedition |
| | Recipient of the Operational Service Medal |
| | South-West Asia |
| | Sierra Leone |
| | Haiti |
| | Sudan |
| | Humanitas |
| | Expedition |

== Special service medals ==
| Ribbon | Honour |
|---|---|
| | Recipient of the Special Service Medal with Bars (Note: Bars worn with first earned nearest the medal; when ribbon is worn, a silver, gold or red maple leaf is worn to show a 2nd, 3rd, 4th or subsequent bar.): Pakistan 1989–90; Alert; Peace/Paix; NATO/OTAN; Humanitas; Ranger; Expedition; Distantia |
| | Recipient of the Canadian Peacekeeping Service Medal |

== United Nations medals ==
| Ribbon | Honour |
|---|---|
| | Recipient of the Korea Medal |
| | Recipient of the Emergency Force (Egypt and Sinai) Medal |
| | Recipient of the Truce Supervision Organization in Palestine (UNTSO) and United Nations Observation Group in Lebanon (UNOGIL) |
| | Recipient of the Military Observer Group in India and Pakistan Medal |
| | Recipient of the Congo Medal |
| | Recipient of the Temporary Executive Authority in West New Guinea Medal |
| | Recipient of the Yemen Observer Mission Medal |
| | Recipient of the Cyprus Medal |
| | Recipient of the India/Pakistan Observation Mission Medal |
| | Recipient of the Emergency Force Middle East Medal |
| | Recipient of the Disengagement Observer Force in Golan Heights Medal |
| | Recipient of the Interim Force in Lebanon Medal |
| | Recipient of the Military Observer Group in Iran and Iraq Medal |
| | Recipient of the Transition Assistance Group in Namibia Medal |
| | Recipient of the Observer Group in Central America Medal |
| | Recipient of the Observer Mission in Iraq and Kuwait Medal |
| | Recipient of the Angola Verification Mission Medal |
| | Recipient of the Mission for the Referendum in Western Sahara Medal |
| | Recipient of the Observer Mission in El Salvador Medal |
| | Recipient of the Protection Force in Yugoslavia Medal |
| | Recipient of the Advance Mission in Cambodia Medal |
| | Recipient of the Transitional Authority in Cambodia Medal |
| | Recipient of the Operation in Somalia Medal |
| | Recipient of the Operation in Mozambique Medal |
| | Recipient of the Observation Mission in Uganda and Rwanda Medal |
| | Recipient of the Assistance Mission in Rwanda Medal |
| | Recipient of the Mission in Haiti Medal |
| | Recipient of the Verification of Human Rights and Compliance with the Comprehensive Agreement on Human Rights in Guatemala Medal |
| | Recipient of the Verification Mission in the Central African Republic Medal |
| | Recipient of the Preventive Deployment Force in Macedonia Medal |
| | Recipient of the Mission in Bosnia and Herzegovina Medal |
| | Recipient of the Observer Group in Prevlaka Medal |
| | Recipient of the Interim Administration Mission in Kosovo Medal |
| | Recipient of the Observer Mission in Sierra Leone Medal |
| | Recipient of the Transitional Administration in East Timor Medal |
| | Recipient of the Mission in the Democratic Republic of the Congo Medal |
| | Recipient of the Mission in Ethiopia and Eritrea Medal |
| | Recipient of the Stabilization Mission in Haiti |
| | Recipient of the Operation in Côte d'Ivoire |
| | Recipient of the Mission in Sudan |
| | Recipient of the Integrated Mission in Timor-Leste |
| | Recipient of the Hybrid Mission with the African Union in Darfur |
| | Recipient of the Mission in South Sudan |
| | Recipient of the Multidimensional Integrated Stabilization Mission in Mali |
| | Recipient of the Special Service Medal |
| | Recipient of the Headquarters Medal |

=== United Nations medals not included in order of precedence ===
Certain United Nations medals are recognized as a part of the Canadian honours system but are not included in the Order in Council that sets out the precedence of honours, decorations, and medals in Canada.

| Ribbon | Honour |
|---|---|
| | Recipient of the UN Good Offices Mission in Afghanistan & Pakistan |

== North Atlantic Treaty Organization medals ==
| Ribbon | Honour |
|---|---|
| | Recipient of the Medal for Former Yugoslavia (1992–2002) |
| | Recipient of the Medal for Kosovo (1998–2002) |
| | Recipient of the Medal for the Former Yugoslav Republic of Macedonia (2001–2002) |
| | Recipient of the Article 5 Medal for Operation Eagle Assist (2001–2002) |
| | Recipient of the Article 5 Medal for Operation Active Endeavour (2001–2016) |
| | Recipient of the Non-Article 5 Medal for Operations in the Balkans (2003–) |
| | Recipient of the Non-Article 5 Medal for the NATO Training Mission in Iraq (2004–2011) |
| | Recipient of the Non-Article 5 Medal for NATO Logistical Support to the African Union Mission in Sudan (2005–2007) |
| | Recipient of the Non-Article 5 Medal for North Atlantic Council Approved NATO operations and activities in relation to Africa (2008–) |
| | Recipient of the Non-Article 5 Medal for Service on NATO Operation Unified Protector - Libya (2011) |
| | Recipient of the Non-Article 5 Medal for Service on NATO Operation Sea Guardian (2016–) |
| More details Ribbon bar: NATO Medal with 'VIGILANCE' clasp. | Recipient of the Non-Article 5 Vigilance Medal (2022–) |

== International mission medals ==
| Ribbon | Honour |
|---|---|
| | Recipient of the International Commission for Supervision and Control Medal; Indo-China, 1954–1973 |
| | Recipient of the International Commission of Control and Supervision Medal; Vietnam, 1973 |
| | Recipient of the Multinational Force and Observers Medal; Sinai, 1982– |
| | Recipient of the European Community Monitor Mission Medal; Yugoslavia, 1991– |
| | Recipient of the International Force East Timor Medal; 1999–2000 |
| | Recipient of the European Security and Defence Policy Service Medals |

== Polar and Volunteer medals ==
| Ribbon | Honour |
|---|---|
| | Recipient of the Polar Medal |
| | Recipient of the Sovereign's Medal for Volunteers |

== Commemorative medals ==
| Ribbon | Honour |
|---|---|
| | Recipient of the Canadian Centennial Medal |
| | Recipient of the Queen Elizabeth II Silver Jubilee Medal |
| | Recipient of the 125th Anniversary of the Confederation of Canada Medal |
| | Recipient of the Queen Elizabeth II Golden Jubilee Medal |
| | Recipient of the Queen Elizabeth II Diamond Jubilee Medal |
| | Recipient of the King Charles III Coronation Medal |

== Long service and good conduct medals ==
| Ribbon | Honour | Post-nominal letters |
|---|---|---|
| | Recipient of the Royal Canadian Mounted Police Long Service Medal | |
| | Recipient of the Canadian Forces' Decoration | CD |

== Exemplary service medals ==
| Ribbon | Honour |
|---|---|
| | Recipient of the Police Exemplary Service Medal |
| | Recipient of the Corrections Exemplary Service Medal |
| | Recipient of the Fire Services Exemplary Service Medal |
| | Recipient of the Canadian Coast Guard Exemplary Service Medal |
| | Recipient of the Emergency Medical Services Exemplary Service Medal |
| | Recipient of the Peace Officer Exemplary Service Medal |

== Special medals ==
| Ribbon | Honour |
|---|---|
| | Recipient of the King's Medal for Champion Shot |

== Other decorations and medals ==
| Ribbon | Honour | Post-nominal letters |
|---|---|---|
| | Recipient of the Queen Elizabeth II Ontario Medal for Good Citizenship | OMC |
| | Recipient of the Ontario Medal for Police Bravery | |
| | Recipient of the Ontario Medal for Firefighters Bravery | |
| | Recipient of the Saskatchewan Volunteer Medal | SVM |
| | Recipient of the Ontario Provincial Police Long Service and Good Conduct Medal | |
| | Recipient of the Service Medal of the Most Venerable Order of the Hospital of St. John of Jerusalem | |
| | Recipient of the Commissionaires Long Service Medal | |
| | Recipient of the Newfoundland and Labrador Bravery Award | |
| | Recipient of the Newfoundland and Labrador Volunteer Service Medal | |
| | Recipient of the British Columbia Fire Services Bravery Medal | |
| | Recipient of the British Columbia Fire Services Long Service Medal | |
| | Recipient of the Commemorative Medal for the Centennial of Saskatchewan | |
| | Recipient of the Alberta Centennial Medal | |
| | Recipient of the Queen Elizabeth II Platinum Jubilee Medal (Note: The lieutenant governors-in-council of six provinces created commemorative medals for the Platinum Jubilee of Elizabeth II. These medals were added to the order of precedence on November 3, 2022 by an Order-in-Council, ranking below the Alberta Centennial Medal.) | |

- Commonwealth orders (approved by the King-in-Council)
- Commonwealth decorations (approved by the King-in-Council)
- Commonwealth medals (approved by the King-in-Council)
- Foreign orders (approved by the King-in-Council)
- Foreign decorations (approved by King-in-Council)
- Foreign medals (approved by the King-in-Council)

There are a number of honours and medals administered by provincial, territorial, and municipal governments, which are not on the list, such as the Order of Polaris, membership in which is awarded by the government of Yukon's Transportation Hall of Fame. This means that they are not part of the Canadian honours system and their insignia must be worn on the right side of the chest, similar to organizational medals granted by the Royal Canadian Legion or the Canadian Cadet Organizations.

== British awards granted prior to 1 June 1972 ==
Any person who, prior to June 1, 1972, was a member of a British order or the recipient of a British decoration or medal may wear the insignia of the decoration or medal together with the insignia of any Canadian order, decoration or medal that the person is entitled to wear, the proper sequence being the following:

=== Orders and decorations ===
| Ribbon | Honour | Post-nominal letters |
|---|---|---|
| | Recipient of the Victoria Cross | VC |
| | Recipient of the George Cross | GC |
| | Recipient of the Cross of Valour | CV |
| | Member of the Order of Merit | OM |
| | Member of the Order of the Companions of Honour | CH |
| | Companion of the Order of Canada | CC |
| | Officer of the Order of Canada | OC |
| | Member of the Order of Canada | CM |
| | Commander of the Order of Military Merit | CMM |
| | Commander of the Order of Merit of the Police Forces | COM |
| | Companion of the Order of the Bath | CB |
| | Companion of the Order of St Michael and St George | CMG |
| | Commander of the Royal Victorian Order | CVO |
| | Commander of the Order of the British Empire | CBE |
| | Companion of the Distinguished Service Order | DSO |
| | Officer of the Order of Military Merit | OMM |
| | Officer of the Order of Merit of the Police Forces | OOM |
| | Lieutenant of the Royal Victorian Order | LVO |
| | Officer of the Order of the British Empire | OBE |
| | Companion of the Imperial Service Order | ISO |
| | Member of the Order of Military Merit | MMM |
| | Member of the Order of Merit of the Police Forces | MOM |
| | Member of the Royal Victorian Order | MVO |
| | Member of the Order of the British Empire | MBE |
| | Member of the Royal Red Cross | RRC |
| | Recipient of the Distinguished Service Cross | DSC |
| | Recipient of the Military Cross | MC |
| | Recipient of the Distinguished Flying Cross | DFC |
| | Recipient of the Air Force Cross | AFC |
| | Recipient of the Star of Military Valour | SMV |
| | Recipient of the Star of Courage | SC |
| | Recipient of the Meritorious Service Cross | MSC |
| | Recipient of the Medal of Military Valour | MMV |
| | Recipient of the Medal of Bravery | MB |
| | Recipient of the Meritorious Service Medal | MSM |
| | Associate of the Royal Red Cross | ARRC |
| | (Insert membership grade) of the Order of St John | # |
| | Provincial Orders (order of precedence as set out in current precedence) | |
| | Recipient of the Distinguished Conduct Medal | DMC |
| | Recipient of the Conspicuous Gallantry Medal | CGM |
| | Recipient of the George Medal | GM |
| | Recipient of the Distinguished Service Medal | DSM |
| | Recipient of the Military Medal | MM |
| | Recipient of the Distinguished Flying Medal | DFM |
| | Recipient of the Air Force Medal | AFM |
| | Recipient of the Queen's Gallantry Medal | QGM |
| | Recipient of the Royal Victorian Medal | RVM |
| | Recipient of the British Empire Medal | BEM |

  1. Note: post-nominal letters for only internal use by the Order of St John.

=== War and operational service medals ===
| Ribbon | Honour |
|---|---|
| | Recipient of the Queen's South Africa Medal (1900–1902) |
| | Recipient of the King's South Africa Medal (1902) |
| | Recipient of the Africa General Service Medal (1902–56) |
| | Recipient of the India General Service Medal (1908–35) |
| | Recipient of the Naval General Service Medal (1915–62) |
| | Recipient of the India General Service Medal (1936–39) |
| | Recipient of the General Service Medal - Army and Air Force (1918–62) |
| | Recipient of the General Service Medal (1962–) |
| | Recipient of the 1914 Star |
| | Recipient of the 1914–15 Star |
| | Recipient of the British War Medal (1914–18) |
| | Recipient of the Mercantile Marine War Medal (1914–18) |
| | Recipient of the Victory Medal (1914–18) |
| | Recipient of the Territorial Force War Medal (1914–19) |
| | Recipient of the 1939–1945 Star |
| | Recipient of the Atlantic Star |
| | Recipient of the Air Crew Europe Star |
| | Recipient of the Africa Star |
| | Recipient of the Pacific Star |
| | Recipient of the Burma Star |
| | Recipient of the Italy Star |
| | Recipient of the France and Germany Star |
| | Recipient of the Defence Medal |
| | Recipient of the Canadian Volunteer Service Medal |
| | Recipient of the Newfoundland Volunteer War Service Medal (this award has the same precedence as the Canadian Volunteer Service Medal) |
| | Recipient of the War Medal (1939–45) |
| | Recipient of the Korea Medal |
| | Recipient of the Canadian Volunteer Service Medal for Korea |
| | Recipient of the Gulf and Kuwait Medal |
| | Recipient of the Somalia Medal |
| | Recipient of the South-West Asia Service Medal |
| | Recipient of the General Campaign Star |

=== Special service medals ===
Order of Precedence as set out above in current precedence

=== United nations medals ===
Order of Precedence as set out above in current precedence

=== International Commission and Organizational medals ===
Order of Precedence as set out above in current precedence

=== Polar medals ===
The order of precedence is the date on which they are awarded.

=== Commemorative medals ===
| Ribbon | Honour |
|---|---|
| | Recipient of the King Edward VII Coronation Medal (1902) |
| | Recipient of the King George V Coronation Medal (1911) |
| | Recipient of the King George V Silver Jubilee Medal (1935) |
| | Recipient of the King George VI Coronation Medal (1937) |
| | Recipient of the Queen Elizabeth II Coronation Medal (1953) |
| | Recipient of the Canadian Centennial Medal (1967) |
| | Recipient of the Queen Elizabeth II Silver Jubilee Medal (1977) |
| | Recipient of the 125th Anniversary of the Confederation of Canada Medal (1992) |
| | Recipient of the Queen Elizabeth II Golden Jubilee Medal (2002) |
| | Recipient of the Queen Elizabeth II Diamond Jubilee Medal (2012) |

=== Long service and good conduct medals ===
| Ribbon | Honour | Post-nominal letters |
|---|---|---|
| | Recipient of the Army Long Service and Good Conduct Medal | |
| | Recipient of the Naval Long Service and Good Conduct Medal | |
| | Recipient of the Air Force Long Service and Good Conduct Medal | |
| | Recipient of the RCMP Long Service Medal | |
| | Recipient of the Volunteer Officer's Decoration | VD |
| | Recipient of the Volunteer Long Service Medal | |
| | Recipient of the Colonial Auxiliary Forces Officer's Decoration | VD |
| | Recipient of the Colonial Auxiliary Forces Long Service Medal | |
| | Recipient of the Efficiency Decoration | ED |
| | Recipient of the Efficiency Medal | |
| | Recipient of the Naval Volunteer Reserve Decoration | VRD |
| | Recipient of the Naval Volunteer Reserve Long Service and Good Conduct Medal | |
| | Recipient of the Air Efficiency Award | |
| | Recipient of the Canadian Forces' Decoration | CD |

=== Exemplary service medals ===
Order of Precedence as set out above in current precedence

=== Special medal ===
| Ribbon | Honour |
|---|---|
| | Recipient of the Queen's Medal for Champion Shot |

=== Other decorations and medals ===
Order of Precedence as set out above in current precedence

Note—Canadians can still be awarded British Medals as well as Medals from other countries but they must first be approved by the Government of Canada. (See Nickle Resolution) These items are worn at the end of the current order of precedence, and one receiving a British Order, Decoration or Medal after 1 June 1972 will abide by the normal order of precedence, not the one catered to pre-1972 awardings.

== See also ==
- List of Canadian provincial and territorial orders
- List of Canadian awards
- Commonwealth realms orders and decorations
- Canadian Forces order of precedence
- 1946 New Year Honours (Canada)
- 2017 Canada Day Honours
- 2018 New Year Honours (Canada)
- 2018 Canada Day Honours
- 2019 New Year Honours (Canada)
- 2019 Canada Day Honours
- 2020 New Year Honours (Canada)
