= Orders, decorations, and medals of Canada =

Canadian honours system

The orders, decorations, and medals of Canada comprise a complex system by which Canadians are honoured by the country's sovereign for actions or deeds that benefit their community or the country at large. Modelled on its British predecessor, the structure originated in the 1930s, but began to come to full fruition at the time of Canada's centennial in 1967, with the establishment of the Order of Canada, and has since grown in both size and scope to include dynastic and national orders, state, civil, and military decorations; and various campaign medals. The monarch in right of each Canadian province also issues distinct orders and medals to honour residents for work performed in just their province. The provincial honours, as with some of their national counterparts, grant the use of post-nominal letters and or supporters and other devices to be used on personal coats of arms.

The monarch is regarded as the fount of all honours—as the monarch is the only person who may create new national honours—and acts as the Sovereign of all of Canada's orders; he, or other members of the royal family, will conduct inductions or present medals. In Canada, the monarch is represented by the governor general, who also carries out investitures and distributes awards in the sovereign's name. As such, administration of the honours system is the responsibility of the Chancellery of Honours at Rideau Hall, which is a part of the Office of the Secretary to the Governor General of Canada. The governor general also sets out, via order-in-council, the order of precedence for the wearing of insignia, decorations, and medals. Provincial and territorial honours are similarly awarded by their respective lieutenant governors or commissioners.

There also exist in Canada numerous awards distributed by and/or named for members of the royal family or viceroys. These are not, however, included in Canada's formal honours system.

== History ==
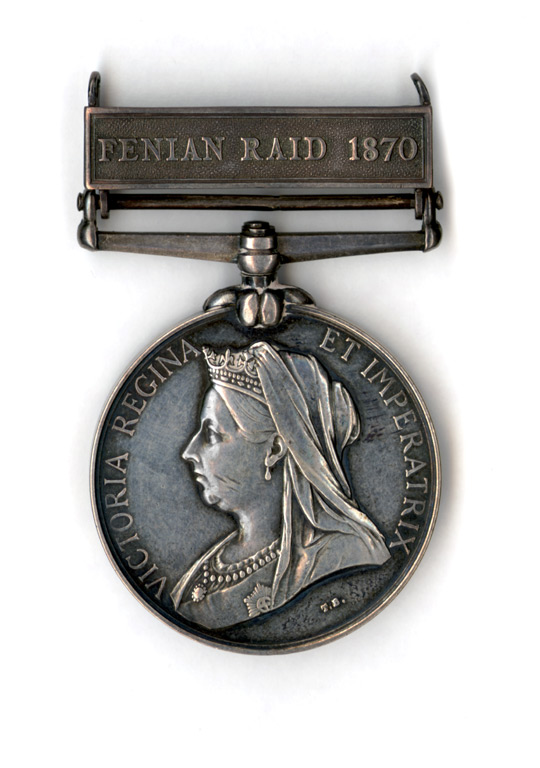
A medal awarded for participation in repelling the Fenian raids, presented by Queen Victoria in 1899

=== Imperial and colonial honours ===
Since as far back as the reign of King Louis XIV, the monarchs that reigned over colonies in New France, British North America, and present-day Canada have bestowed royal honours, decorations, and medals on those living under their sovereignty, in recognition of their services to the state. Early governors of New France also desired to establish local honours in or import European honours to Canada; Samuel de Champlain, for instance, founded on 14 November 1606 the Order of Good Cheer (still extant today) and Charles de Montmagny had designs to establish the Sovereign Military Order of Malta in New France while he was governor from 1635 to 1648. The Ordre Royal et Militaire de Saint-Louis, established by King Louis XIV in 1693 specifically to honour worthy French, Catholic military officers, came to be one of the most familiar honours in New France; some 300 people associated with Canada were appointed into it, Louis-Hector de Callière being the first. Appointments into the order continued even after the transfer of New France to the British Crown in 1763.

After the creation of British North America, Canadians were entitled to receive British imperial honours, though the awarding of these was not consistently allowed. From Confederation until the Nickle Resolution in 1919, the Order of Saint Michael and Saint George served as the equivalent of today's Order of Canada, being the highest non-peerage honour available to Canadian politicians, judges, and civil servants. Appointments into the Order of the British Empire, into grades below those that carried a title, were also commonly made. Besides knighthoods, peerage titles (both hereditary and life) were also bestowed on Canadians, sometimes with uniquely Canadian designations—such as Baroness Macdonald of Earnscliffe and Baron Beaverbrook of Beaverbrook in the Province of New Brunswick and of Cherkley in the County of Surrey—and permitted those so honoured to sit in the House of Lords at Westminster. Such acts of recognition were carried out by the reigning British monarch. Prior to Confederation, the sovereign did so on the advice of the British prime minister; the names of those to be honoured were either selected by the colonial governor or governor general in British North America and passed on to the Secretary of state for the colonies and then the prime minister; by the secretary and passed on to the prime minister; or by the prime minister himself. The British government felt no obligation to consult any government in British North America before bestowing an honour upon any resident of the colonies. Following Confederation, the prime minister of Canada submitted a list of names to the monarch via the governor general; though, the governor general also continued to recommend individuals for honours without the Canadian prime minister's knowledge.

This practice came into question in 1901, when Governor General the Earl of Minto nominated Thomas Shaughnessy for a knighthood, even after Prime Minister Wilfrid Laurier (an opponent of Shaughnessy) expressed his opposition to the idea, leading Laurier in the following year to draft a policy whereby all nominees for honours be approved by the prime minister before being forwarded to Westminster. Later, the public began to suspect the worthiness of those receiving the knighthoods and elevations to the peerage; the controversy that surrounded the appointment of Sam Hughes as a Knight Commander of the Order of the Bath in 1915 marked the beginning of the end of such honours in Canada. After it was revealed in 1917 that British Prime Minister David Lloyd George had been selling peerage titles and knighthoods to raise money for his political party (Montreal Star owner Hugh Graham's elevation as the Baron Atholstan being granted seemingly without merit and against the advice of both Canadian Prime Minister Robert Borden and Governor General the Duke of Devonshire), the awarding of such distinctions in Canada immediately ceased. Thereafter, the House of Commons of Canada in 1917 and 1919 passed the Nickle Resolutions, which, though never legally binding, generally cemented the cease of titular awards to Canadians. The end of the conferment of imperial honours on Canadians came in 1955. Awards for gallantry and bravery, such as the Victoria Cross, however, remained available and knighthoods were still conferred: on Sir Frederick Banting in 1934, Sir Edwin Leather in 1964, and Sir Terry Matthews in 2002. Further, some pre-existing Canadian peerages continued to be recognised—the Baron de Longueuil and Baron Thomson of Fleet, for example—and still others were granted after 1919 by the sovereign of Canada, such as the Viscount Bennett of Mickleham, Hopewell, and Calgary.

=== Canadian honours ===
Governor General the Viscount Monck had originally pushed for a distinct Canadian order of knighthood in 1867, to be called the Order of St Lawrence. The idea was revived by Vincent Massey in 1935 and again in 1951, in between which he also suggested in 1940 a Royal Order of Canada. The Canadian Cabinet, however, never accepted these proposals, generally wishing instead to steer clear of the controversial topic of orders. Still, the beginnings of a distinct Canadian honours system came in March 1934, with the creation of the Royal Canadian Mounted Police Long Service Medal by royal warrant of King George V, issued on the advice of the Cabinet of R. B. Bennett; this was the first time an honour specific to Canada and for service in Canada had been established by the monarch of Canada (as opposed to earlier campaign and service medals that had been issued to Canadians and British personnel alike by the British monarch). There was uncertainty amongst officials in Canada and Britain alike around how to go about creating such an honour, and delays were incurred not only as Canadian bureaucrats interpreted the Nickle Resolution as applying to medals, but also because the King himself was widening the project to consider all the Empire police forces.

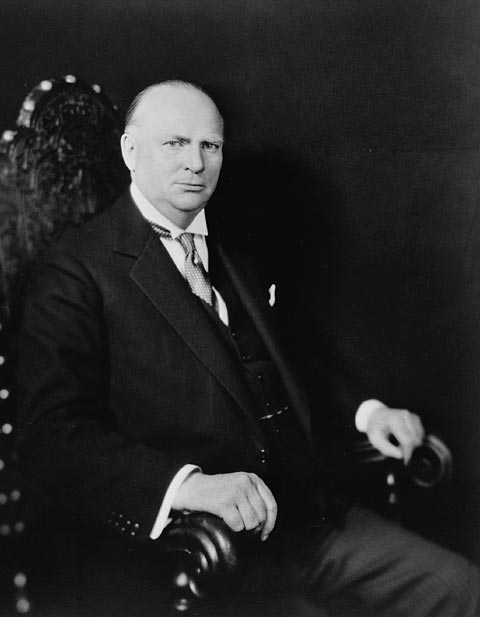
Prime Minister of Canada R.B. Bennett, who advised King George V to create the Royal Canadian Mounted Police Long Service Medal

This process was refined through the Second World War and Korean War, though the pool of available honours became smaller and smaller as the decades progressed; non-titular British honours continued to be granted until 1946 and, from 1950 and 1953, only British military decorations were permitted. In 1942, the Canada Medal was created by royal warrant of King George VI, though none was ever struck, and the Canadian Forces' Decoration was founded in 1947. Though the Letters Patent of 1947 issued by the King permitted the governor general to exercise most of the monarch's royal prerogative on his behalf, it was agreed between George VI and his Canadian Prime Minister at the time, William Lyon Mackenzie King, that the sovereign alone would retain the prerogative to create new honours. In 1951, the first distinctly Canadian campaign medal, the Korea Medal, was created, when other Commonwealth countries used the British version.

The centennial of Canadian Confederation in 1967 provided the right opportunity and circumstances in which to establish Canada's first order: the Order of Canada. The system was revised in 1972 and has since expanded, mostly through the 1990s, and generally attracted little criticism; indeed, the orders, decorations, and medals of Canada inspired other Commonwealth realms, such as Australia and New Zealand, to adopt similar approaches in their respective jurisdictions, as did each of Canada's provinces. However, some experts in the field, such as Christopher McCreery, have pointed out what they see as deficiencies in the construct: At the 2006 conference on Commonwealth Honours, the concern was raised that Canada does not have a way to recognize the nation's very best; the three grades of the Order of Canada being insufficient to do so. It was suggested that either two more levels be added to the Order of Canada, equivalent to knighthoods in Australian and British orders, or create a new single class but limited-membership order, similar to the Order of New Zealand. The order of precedence also came under scrutiny, particularly the anomaly that all three grades of the Order of Canada supersede the top levels of each of the other orders, contrary to international practice. McCreery echoed these comments in 2010 and added that the Canadian honours system was lacking a polar medal (which was created in 2015), such as those issued in other northern nations, as well as a public service order, akin to the Imperial Service Order, and honours to specifically recognise protective services other than the police forces.

In June 2010, McCreery highlighted inconsistency in honouring those in Canada's royal family. For example, the Queen Mother was appointed a Companion of the Order of Canada on only an honorary basis, though the Canadian Forces' Decoration awarded to her was substantive. Similarly, Prince Philip, Duke of Edinburgh, was offered only honorary appointment to the Order of Canada, which he refused on the grounds that, as the royal consort of the Queen, he was Canadian and thus entitled to a substantive appointment, as he had been awarded the Canadian Forces Decoration and Commemorative Medal for the Centennial of Saskatchewan. In 2013, the constitutions of the Order of Canada and the Order of Military Merit were amended to create for each of the three grades of each order an extraordinary category reserved for those members of the royal family (in the Canadian Forces for the latter order) nominated and approved for appointment. Upon taking office, governors general and viceregal consorts become Extraordinary Companions of the Order of Canada and the governor general an Extraordinary Commander of the Order of Military Merit.

== Structure and the creation of honours ==
Charles III, as King of Canada, is the fount of the Canadian honours system

All honours in Canada emanate from the country's monarch, who is regarded as the fount of honour; only he or she may create new honours, though this, as part of the Royal Prerogative, is generally done on the advice of the sitting ministers of the Crown. The sovereign's representative in Canada, the governor general, administers most of the honours system through the Chancellery of Honours, which is a part of the Office of the Secretary to the Governor General of Canada. The governor general also sets out, via order-in-council, the order of precedence for the wearing of insignia, decorations, and medals.

The momentum to create a new honour typically originates at either the Chancellery of Honours or the Department of National Defence, though private organisations or individuals may also make proposals. The Chancellery will investigate whether or not the suggested honour is necessary and if it will conform within the national honours structure. Should it meet these criteria, the notion is put before the Honours Policy Committee—a group of senior public servants, formed in 1980 within the Privy Council Office—and then, if approved, is moved before the Cabinet for an order-in-council to be drawn up. On the prime minister's advice, via the governor general, the documents and drawings for the new honour are presented to the monarch for his consideration; only with his signature on the relevant letters patent and the design sketches does the new honour officially become extant. Any future amendments to the honour's appearance or award criteria do not need the monarch's approval; the governor general will perform such tasks instead.

In the Canadian structure, unlike its counterparts in Britain and other countries, nominees' names are put forward to the governor general by independent committees, which in turn receive nominations from the public, in an attempt to create a non-partisan process that avoids political controversy. Most orders have a unique advisory committee, consisting of individuals relevant to the scope of the particular order, all appointed by the governor general or a delegate; for instance, the Advisory Committee for the Order of Military Merit has six members: one appointed by the governor general, four by the chief of the Defence Staff, and the chief of the Defence Staff him or herself. There are also advisory councils or committees for decorations in general and for valour decorations, specifically. The secretary to the governor general will usually serve as secretary general to many of these boards.

The Canadian honours system also includes two dynastic orders—the Order of Merit and the Royal Victorian Order — and one personal award of the sovereign – the Royal Victorian Chain. These were created by the sovereign alone and inductions and presentations are at the monarch's personal discretion.

== Orders ==
Canada has both dynastic (created by the sovereign and membership in which is a personal gift of the monarch, granted without ministerial advice) and national (initiated by order-in-council and created by letters patent and membership in which is carried out on the advice of advisory committees) orders. These have a number of grades or classes to acknowledge different levels of achievement. Usually, the insignia for the top grades are worn on a neck ribbon by men and on a pinned bow by women, while those for the lower levels are worn suspended on ribbons attached to the left of the jacket of dress, those for women again usually on a bow. These insignia are presented to the recipient by either the monarch or governor general. Orders are not awarded to individuals, instead one is appointed into membership in a society of honour, and can be promoted to higher grades within the group. The appointment to an order also entitles the appointee to post-nominal letters.

=== Order of Merit ===
Admission to the Order of Merit (French: Ordre du Mérite) is the highest civilian award for merit in Canada. Founded in 1902 by King Edward VII to recognise distinguished service in the armed forces, science, art, literature, or for the promotion of culture, the Order of Merit has one grade and carries with it only the post-nominal letters OM. One of the few dynastic orders in Canada, the order's membership is limited to, at one time, no more than 24 living individuals from the Commonwealth realms. Five Canadians have been appointed to the order: William Lyon Mackenzie King, Wilder Penfield, Lester B. Pearson, Jean Chrétien, and Margaret MacMillan.

=== Order of Canada ===
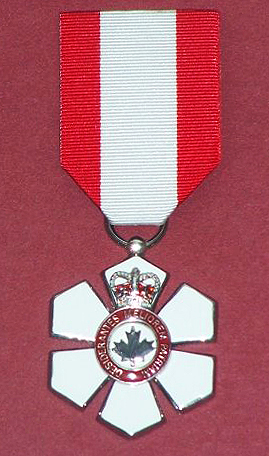
A replica of Father Maurice Proulx's Order of Canada medal in the Musée François-Pilote in La Pocatière, Quebec.

The Order of Canada (French: Ordre du Canada) is the country's second highest civilian honour for merit and is administered by the governor general-in-Council, on behalf of the monarch of Canada. Created in 1967, appointment is granted to those who adhere to the order's motto Desiderantes meliorem patriam (Latin for: 'desiring a better country'), meaning that, in essence, the honour recognises lifetime contributions made by Canadians who made a major difference to Canada, or non-Canadians who made the world better by their actions. Musicians, politicians, artists, entertainers, benefactors, and many more have been accepted into the order; since its creation, more than 8,000 people have been appointed to the Order of Canada. The order, of which the monarch is Sovereign and the serving governor general is Chancellor and Principal Companion, is currently composed of three grades: Companion (CC), Officer (OC), and Member (CM).

For each grade, there is an extraordinary category reserved for those members of the royal family nominated and approved for appointment. Upon taking office, governors general and viceregal consorts become Extraordinary Companions for life or until removal from the order.

=== Order of Military Merit ===
The Order of Military Merit (French: Ordre du mérite militaire), established in 1972 by Queen Elizabeth II, is a society of members of the Canadian Forces who have demonstrated dedication and devotion beyond the call of duty. The reigning monarch serves as the order's Sovereign, with the governor general as the Chancellor and the chief of the Defence Staff as Principal Commander. The award has three classes: Commander (CMM), Officer (OMM), and Member (MMM).

For each grade, there is an extraordinary category reserved for those members of the royal family in the Canadian Forces nominated and approved for appointment. Upon taking office, governors general become Extraordinary Commanders for life or until removal from the order.

=== Order of Merit of the Police Forces ===
Members of Canada's various police bodies who have demonstrated conspicuous merit and exceptional service are inducted into the Order of Merit of the Police Forces (French: Ordre du mérite des corps policiers), which was created in 2000 by Queen Elizabeth II. As with the Order of Military Merit, the reigning monarch is the Sovereign of the order, while the governor general is the Chancellor and the commissioner of the Royal Canadian Mounted Police acts as Principal Commander. The order has three grades: Commander (COM), Officer (OOM), and Member (MOM).

=== Royal Victorian Order ===
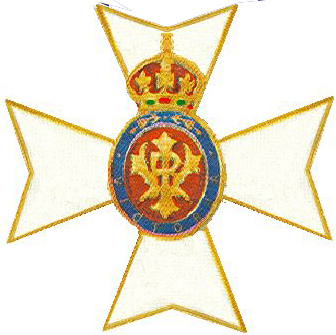
The embroidered insignia of a Commander or Lieutenant of the Royal Victorian Order

The Royal Victorian Order (French: Ordre royal de Victoria) is a dynastic order established in 1896 by Queen Victoria to recognise those who performed exemplary personal service for the sovereign. The order's day is 20 June, the date of Victoria's accession to the throne, and its motto is Victoria. The structure includes five classes and a medal, though the levels of Knight or Dame Grand Cross and Knight or Dame Commander, available to all in other Commonwealth realms, are not normally open to Canadian citizens, due to the titles that come with appointment to those grades and the Cabinet's adherence to the non-binding Nickle Resolution. Members of the royal family, however, as subjects of the Canadian monarch but not citizens of Canada, can, and do, occupy the two uppermost grades. The order's classes, in order of seniority, are: Knight or Dame Grand Cross (GCVO), Knight or Dame Commander (KCVO or DCVO), Commander (CVO), Lieutenant (LVO), and Member (MVO). Award of the Royal Victorian Medal allows the recipient the use of the post-nominal letters RVM.

=== Order of the Hospital of Saint John of Jerusalem ===
The Most Venerable Order of the Hospital of Saint John of Jerusalem (French: L'Ordre très vénérable de l'Hôpital de Saint-Jean de Jérusalem) is a working order of charitably minded men and women whose philanthropy is expressed principally through its two foundations: the St. John Eye Hospital in Jerusalem and St. John Ambulance. The order traces its origins to the Knights Hospitaller of the Crusades, who served the Abbey of St. Mary's small hospital for sick pilgrims in Jerusalem in the 12th century. It was established in the United Kingdom in 1831 and given a royal charter by Queen Victoria in 1888, and has existed in Canada in some form for many years, but was only officially brought into the Canadian honours system in 1995. The governor general is the Prior and Chief Officer in Canada, while the lieutenant governors serve as Vice-Prior in their respective province. Each is also automatically appointed as a Knight or Dame of Justice in case of the Prior and his or her spouse, or a Knight or Dame of Grace in the case of lieutenant governors upon being sworn into their viceregal office. Spouses of lieutenant governors are made Officers. Members of the royal family may also hold the level of Bailiffs or Dames Grand Cross.

Currently, there are approximately 5,500 active Canadian members in the Order, induction being granted by nomination only to Canadian citizens or permanent residents at or over the age of 18. This is done at the discretion of the Sovereign Head of the Order, King Charles III, on the advice of the Prior.

In Canada, the order has five grades: Bailiffs or Dames Grand Cross, Knights/Dames, Commanders, Officers, and Members. Esquires are not members of the Order but instead members of the Priory.

Appointments or promotions to any grade within the Order carries no entitlement to post-nominals.

== Decorations ==
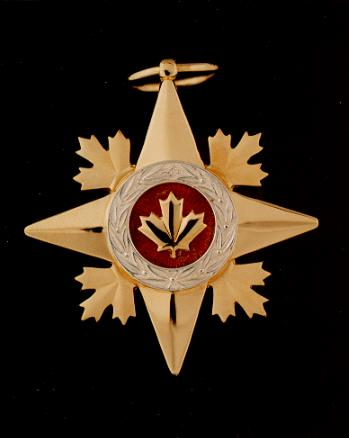
The Star of Military Valour, the second highest of Canada's military valour decorations

Decorations are awarded for gallantry, civilian bravery, or meritorious services; only the Royal Victorian Medal (post-nominal letters RVM, French: Médaille royale de Victoria), a decoration associated with the Royal Victorian Order, is not slotted into any of the three aforementioned categories. They are similar to national orders, are created by the sovereign and conferred by her or her viceroy, and are worn on the left side of the jacket or dress. Decorations also entitle the recipient to post-nominal letters.

=== Military valour decorations ===
The military valour decorations were created on 2 February 1993 by Queen Elizabeth II, on the advice of her Cabinet under then-Prime Minister Brian Mulroney. For all three military valour decorations, recipients must be a member of the Canadian Forces or an allied armed force that is serving with or in conjunction with the Canadian Forces, on or after 1 January 1993. All military valour decorations may be awarded posthumously.

The Victoria Cross (post-nominal letters VC, French: Croix de Victoria) is the highest award for valour available to members of the Canadian Forces of any rank, in any service, and allies serving under or with Canadian military command. Based on the British version of the same medal, it is only awarded for extraordinary valour and devotion to duty while facing a hostile force. Prior to 1993, the original Victoria Cross was awarded to 94 Canadians, none of whom are now living. No Canadian Victoria Cross has been issued since its creation.

The Star of Military Valour (post-nominal letters SMV, French: Étoile de la vaillance militaire) was created as an award for Canadian Forces personnel who had demonstrated "distinguished and valiant service in the presence of the enemy." The star may be presented more than once, an additional bar on the medal's ribbon marking each subsequent award. It was only first presented in 2006, as Canada's participation in the 2001 invasion of Afghanistan created for the first time circumstances wherein one could carry out actions deserving of the Star of Military Valour.

The Medal of Military Valour (post-nominal letters MMV, French: Médaille de la vaillance militaire) is awarded to members of the Canadian Forces for "an act of valour or devotion to duty in the presence of the enemy." The medal, too, was only first awarded in 2006 and may be earned multiple times, marked by the addition of bars to the medal's ribbon.

=== Bravery decorations ===
Established on 1 May 1972 by Queen Elizabeth II, on the advice of her Cabinet headed by Pierre Trudeau, the bravery decorations are awarded to any person who risked his or her life to save or protect another person; it is not necessary that the incident take place in Canada, and no particular person must be Canadian, but it is required that at least one individual involved in the occurrence be a Canadian citizen. Nominations must be made within two years of the incident, or within two years after a court or a coroner has concluded its review on the circumstances surrounding the incident or act of bravery, and each decoration may be awarded posthumously.

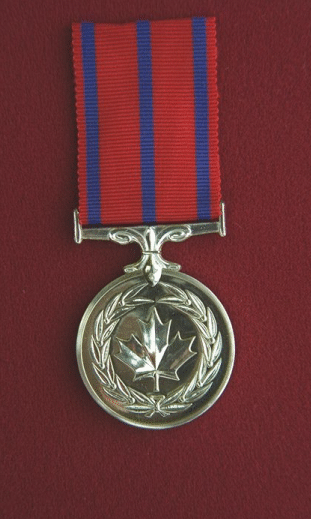
The Canadian Medal of Bravery, the lowest of Canada's three bravery decorations

The Cross of Valour (post-nominal letters CV, French: Croix de la vaillance) is the highest ranking of the Canadian bravery decorations, and is awarded for "acts of the most conspicuous courage in circumstances of extreme peril." It was intended to both replace the never-issued Medal of Courage of the Order of Canada, and to act as the Canadian equivalent of the George Cross. It was presented for the first time on 20 July 1972.

Presented to both living and deceased individuals deemed to have performed "acts of conspicuous courage in circumstances of great peril," the Star of Courage (post-nominal letters SC, French: Étoile du Courage) is the second-highest ranking of Canadian bravery decorations. As of April 2018, the Star of Courage has been presented to 458 people, though no bars have yet been issued.

The Medal of Bravery (post-nominal letters MB, French: Médaille de la Bravoure) is the third rank of the bravery decorations, awarded in recognition of "acts of bravery in hazardous circumstances," and has been awarded most frequently; as of April 2018, 3,304 medals had been awarded.

=== Meritorious service decorations ===
The meritous service decorations are each divided into military and civilian categories, which each may be awarded to both Canadians and non-Canadians. The set of awards was initially formed on 11 June 1984 by Queen Elizabeth II, on the advice of Prime Minister Pierre Trudeau, but consisted of decorations available only to Canadian Forces personnel; it was on 6 June 1991 that the civilian classifications were added.

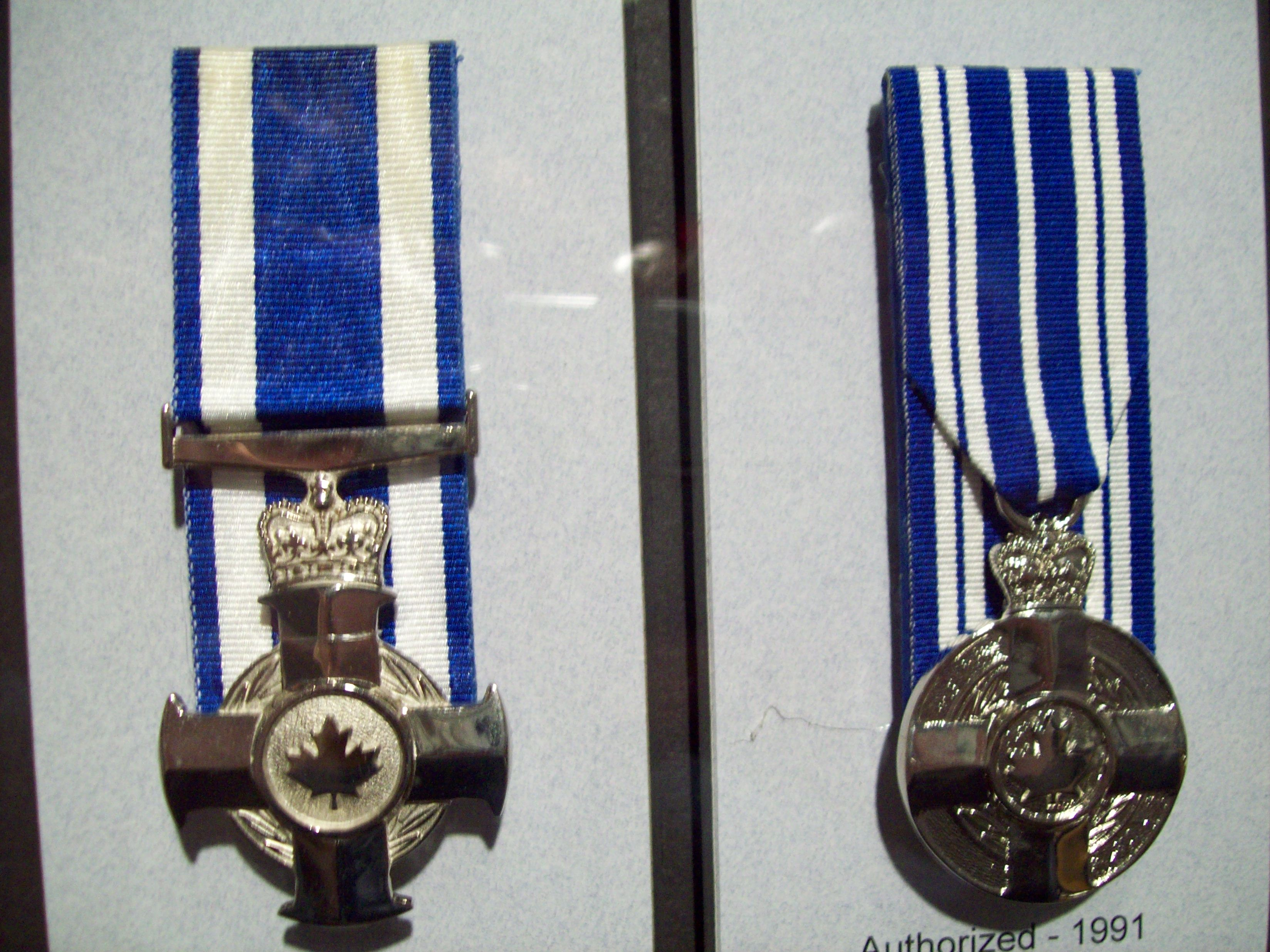
Canada's two meritorious service decorations, (left to right) the Meritorious Service Cross (military division) and the Meritorious Service Medal (civil division)

The Meritorious Service Cross (post-nominal letters MSC, French: Croix du service méritoire) is intended to recognize individuals—both Canadian and foreign—who have carried out meritorious acts bringing benefit and honour. The military division recognises highly professional acts that are of considerable benefit to the Canadian Forces, while its civilian counterpart honours similar acts—whether in athletics, diplomatic relations, humanitarian activities, etc.—that benefit the nation.

The Meritorious Service Medal (post-nominal letters MSM, French: Médaille du service méritoire) is the secondary meritorious service decoration and recognises highly professional acts that are of considerable benefit to the Canadian Forces by military personnel, and to the nation by civilians.

=== Royal Victorian Chain ===
The Royal Victorian Chain is a decoration created in 1902 by King Edward VII as a personal gift of the monarch. Originally reserved for members of the royal family, the chain is a distinct award conferred only upon the highest dignitaries, including foreign monarchs, heads of state, and high-ranking individuals. It is an element of the Canadian honours system, but not included in the order of precedence for the wear of honours, decorations, and medals. (Note: In his book The Order of Canada: Its Origins, History, and Development, Christopher McCreery places the Royal Victorian Chain below the Order of Merit and above a Companion of the Order of Canada.) It does not provide recipients with any title or post-nominal letters and there is no associated ribbon for men; however, women can wear the insignia on a bow fashioned from the ribbon of the RVC. Former Governors General Vincent Massey and Roland Michener were both given the RVC by Queen Elizabeth II; the second and third commoners to receive the honour.

== Medals ==
Canada has various types of medals, some part of the official honours system and others not. Those in the former category tend to be related to state organisations, such as police forces, fire protection, or the military. These can be further sub-categorised into long service and campaign medals. Others are awarded to military and civilians alike for anniversaries—the Canadian Centennial or the Golden Jubilee of Elizabeth II, for example—or for community service. Still others are awarded by international organisations and integrated into the Canadian honours structure; the United Nations Medals and North Atlantic Treaty Organization medals, for example. As medals are awarded more widely than orders or decorations, they are typically presented by higher-ranking officials in the organization the recipient is a part of. Only the Canadian Forces Decoration grants a holder the use of post-nominal letters.

=== Sacrifice medals ===
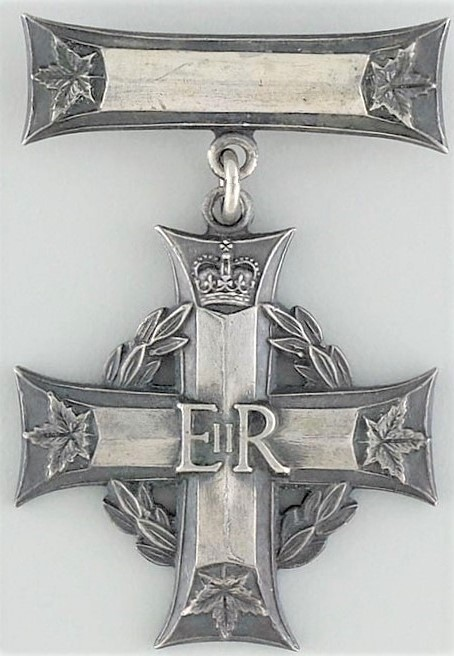
The Memorial Cross, as rendered during the reign of Queen Elizabeth II

Within the Canadian system of honours are medals that specifically recognise death or severe injury in the course of military service. The Memorial Cross (French: Croix du Souvenir) was created in 1919 by King George V, it is to be awarded to the mother, widow, widower, or next of kin of any member of the Canadian Forces who loses his or her life in active service, including peacekeeping, and other such international operations. From amongst the recipients of the medal has been drawn annually the Silver Cross Mother. Later, in 2008, Queen Elizabeth II approved the establishment of the Sacrifice Medal (French: Médaille du sacrifice) as a replacement for the Wound Stripe, to be presented to any member of the Canadian Forces or allied forces who were wounded or killed in action. The medal is also awarded posthumously to any member of the Canadian Forces who dies under honourable circumstances as a result of an injury or disease related to military service.

=== Campaign medals ===
Canada's campaign medals are a continuation of the tradition of the monarch recognising service in a designated military operation or performance of duty in a geographical theatre; save for the General Campaign Stars and Medals, each is associated with a particular conflict. The general star and medal are issued for any active service in a combat zone, which one or ones being distinguished by additional clasps that are worn on the medal's ribbon. Such medals presently recognised in the Canadian honours system are:

- Korea Medal: recognising combat service in the Korean War, 1950–1953
- Canadian Volunteer Service Medal for Korea: recognising non-combat service in the Korea War, 1950–1953
- Gulf and Kuwait Medal: recognising service in the Gulf War, 1990–1991
- Somalia Medal: recognising service in the Somali Civil War, 1992–1993
- South-West Asia Service Medal: recognising service in campaigns against terrorism in South-West Asia
- General Campaign Star: recognising combat service in various campaigns, a unique bar for each campaign
- Operational Service Medal: recognising combat and non-combat service in various campaigns, a unique ribbon for each campaign

Canadians earlier qualified for British campaign medals, though these awards were, at the time, not foreign to Canada. Some were created specifically for Canada, such as the Canadian General Service Medal, which was issued in 1899 to recognise active participation in defending the country from the Fenian raids and later in suppressing the Red River Rebellion.

=== Service medals ===
- General Service Medal
- Special Service Medal
- Canadian Peacekeeping Service Medal

=== Polar and volunteer medals ===
Sovereign's Medal for Volunteers Medal and Pin

The Polar Medal (French: Médaille polaire) and Sovereign's Medal for Volunteers (French: Médaille du souverain pour les bénévoles) were both created by Queen Elizabeth II in 2015, incorporating and replacing the Governor General's Northern Medal (established by Governor General Adrienne Clarkson in 2005) and the Governor General's Caring Canadian Award (established by Governor General Roméo LeBlanc in 1995), respectively. This made them honours of the Crown, permitting them to be incorporated into the Canadian honours system.

=== Commemorative medals ===
Until 1977, the practice for coronation and jubilee medals was for authorities in the United Kingdom to decide on a total number of medallions to be produced and allocate how many were to be distributed to each of the British Empire and Crown dependencies and possessions, and later Commonwealth of Nations countries. From that point, the award of the medals was at the discretion of the local government authority. Such medals are awarded to Canadians who have been deemed to have made a significant contribution to their fellow citizens, their community or to Canada. So that all regions of the country are recognised equally, the federal, provincial, and civic governments all forward names to Rideau Hall, as do private organizations in the fields of the arts, sports, philanthropy, and charity. The full membership of the Order of Canada and Order of Military Merit, as well as all winners of Canadian bravery decorations will typically also receive commemorative medals automatically, while for members of the Canadian Forces, merit with length of service and prestige of current appointment is considered. Such medals presently recognised in the Canadian honours system are:

- Queen Elizabeth II Coronation Medal: marking the coronation of Queen Elizabeth II, 1953
- Canadian Centennial Medal: marking the 100th anniversary of Canadian Confederation, 1967
- Queen Elizabeth II Silver Jubilee Medal: marking the 25th anniversary of the accession of Queen Elizabeth II, 1977
- 125th Anniversary of the Confederation of Canada Medal: marking the 125th anniversary of Canadian Confederation, 1992
- Queen Elizabeth II Golden Jubilee Medal: marking the 50th anniversary of the accession of Queen Elizabeth II, 2002
- Queen Elizabeth II Diamond Jubilee Medal: marking the 60th anniversary of the accession of Queen Elizabeth II, 2012
- Queen Elizabeth II Platinum Jubilee Medal (provincial): marking the 70th anniversary of the accession of Queen Elizabeth II, 2022
- King Charles III Coronation Medal: marking the coronation of King Charles III, 2023

Earlier commemorative medals for Canada or given to Canadians included:

All Canadian commemorative medals excepting the 1887 Queen Victoria Golden Jubilee Medal

- Confederation Medal: marking the confederation of Canada, 1867
- Queen Victoria Golden Jubilee Medal: marking the 50th anniversary of the accession of Queen Victoria, 1887
- Queen Victoria Diamond Jubilee Medal: marking the 60th anniversary of the accession of Queen Victoria, 1897
- King Edward VII Coronation Medal: marking the coronation of King Edward VII, 1902
- King George V Coronation Medal: marking the coronation of King George V, 1911
- Confederation Diamond Jubilee Medal: marking the 60th anniversary of Canadian Confederation, 1927
- King George V Silver Jubilee Medal: marking the 25th anniversary of the accession of King George V, 1935
- King George VI Coronation Medal: marking the coronation of King George VI, 1937

A medal for the sesquicentennial of Confederation in 2017 was originally planned and work on it progressed to the point of renderings, prepared medal certificates, and drafted regulations and letters patent before Minister of Canadian Heritage Melanie Joly cancelled the project in 2016, without stated reason.

=== Long service and good conduct medals ===
The Canadian Forces' Decoration (post-nominal letters CD) was initiated in 1949 and first awarded in September 1951. The medal replaced all other long service awards for those joining the Canadian Forces after September 1939. It is awarded to members of the Canadian Forces of all ranks who have completed twelve years of military service. By convention, it is also given to the governor general of Canada upon his or her appointment as viceroy, which includes the title of Commander-in-Chief in and over Canada. Despite its name, the Canadian Forces Decoration is a medal, as opposed to a decoration.

Other long service medals include:

- Royal Canadian Mounted Police Long Service Medal
- Service Medal of the Most Venerable Order of the Hospital of St. John of Jerusalem
- Commissionaires Long Service Medal

=== Exemplary service medals ===
- Police Exemplary Service Medal
- Corrections Exemplary Service Medal
- Fire Services Exemplary Service Medal
- Canadian Coast Guard Exemplary Service Medal
- Emergency Medical Services Exemplary Service Medal
- Peace Officer Exemplary Service Medal

=== Other ===
- Queen's Medal for Champion Shot

== Provinces and territories ==
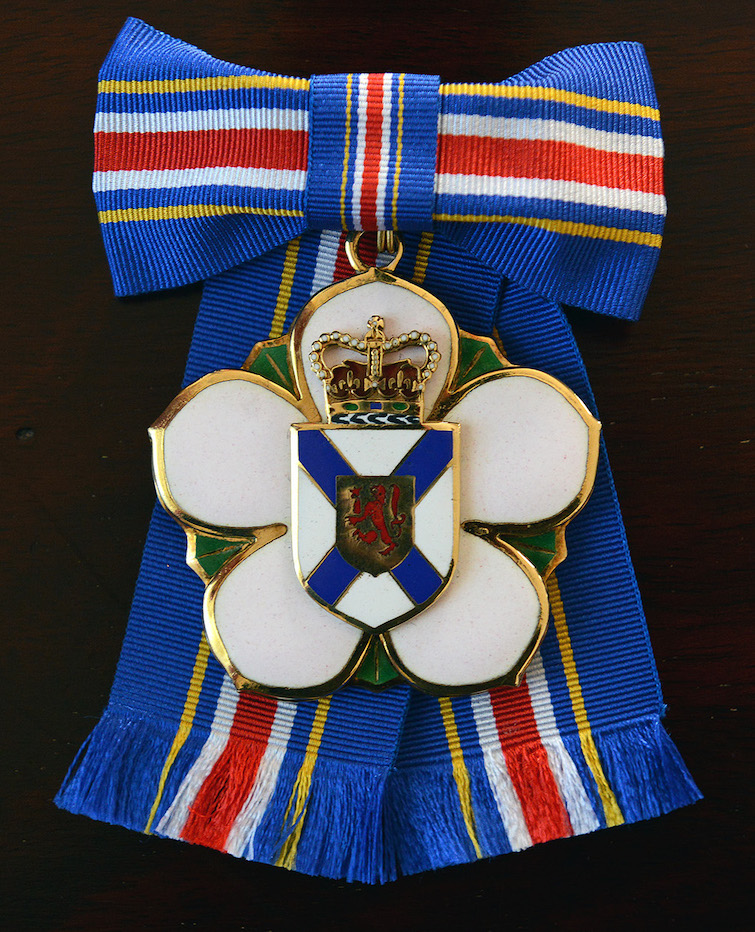
The insignia and ribbon of the Order of Nova Scotia

The Canadian provinces and territories each have their own internal honours system, though they differ in some ways from their federal counterpart. British Columbia was the first to create a provincial honour in 1953. However, after the establishment of the Canadian honours system in 1967, other provinces moved to initiate their own systems after the federal government refused to do so on their behalf. An agreement was eventually reached around 1990 on the placement of the provincial honours in the Canadian order of precedence for orders, decorations, and medals.

== Imperial and foreign honours ==
State honours bestowed upon a Canadian by a foreign government must be approved by the governor general-in-Council before the insignia, decoration, or medal may be worn. Those for honours bestowed by other Commonwealth countries are worn, in the order of date of appointment or award, following all those for Canadian honours, should the recipient have any. The same from countries not in the Commonwealth are worn after those from Commonwealth countries, again in order of date of appointment or award. However, the insignia of orders, as well as medals and decorations, within the Imperial (i.e. British) honours system that were received by a Canadian prior to 1 June 1972 have a different order of wear, mixed with the designated order for Canadian honours.

Canadians remain eligible for appointment into the Order of the Companions of Honour, as its statutes set aside a specific number of the order's total 65 places for residents of Australia, New Zealand, and the United Kingdom, and 11 for those from any other Commonwealth country. Appointments are made on the recommendation of the appropriate cabinet. The order currently has three Canadian members: John de Chastelain, Margaret MacMillan, and Margaret Atwood, who were nominated by the Cabinet of the United Kingdom.

== Peerages ==
The escutcheon of the arms of the Baron of Longueuil

A number of distinctly Canadian titles have been granted by the sovereign. These include (with existent ones in italics):

- Baron de Longueuil, named for Longueuil, Quebec. Created in 1700, the present holder is Michael Grant, the 12th Baron de Longueuil.
- Baron Mount Stephen (of Mount Stephen in the Province of British Columbia and Dominion of Canada, and of Dufftown in the County of Banff), named for Mount Stephen, British Columbia. Created in 1891, the title is extinct, the first and only holder being George Stephen.
- Baron Macdonald of Earnscliffe (in the Province of Ontario and Dominion of Canada), named for Earnscliffe in Ottawa, Ontario. Created in 1891, the title is extinct, the last and only holder being Agnes Macdonald.
- Baron Strathcona and Mount Royal (of Mount Royal in the Province of Quebec and Dominion of Canada and of Glencoe in the County of Argyll), named for Strathcona County, Alberta and Mount Royal, Quebec. Created in 1900 (the original creation of 1897, without remainder to the first holder's only child, a daughter, is extinct), the present holder, since 2018, is Donald Alexander Euan Howard, fifth Baron Strathcona and Mount Royal.
- Baron Shaughnessy (of the City of Montreal in the Dominion of Canada and of Ashford in the County of Limerick), named for Shaughnessy, British Columbia. Created in 1916, the present holder is Charles Shaughnessy, the fifth Baron Shaughnessy.
- Baron Beaverbrook (of Beaverbrook in the Province of New Brunswick in the Dominion of Canada and of Cherkley in the County of Surrey), named for Beaverbrook, New Brunswick. Created in 1917, the present holder is Maxwell Aitken, the third Baron Beaverbrook.
- Baron Atholstan (of Huntingdon in the Province of Quebec in the Dominion of Canada and of the City of Edinburgh), named for Huntingdon, Quebec. Created in 1917, the title is extinct, the last and only holder being Hugh Graham.
- Viscount Bennett (of Mickleham in the County of Surrey and of Calgary and Hopewell in the Dominion of Canada), named for Mickleham, Surrey; Hopewell Hill, New Brunswick; and Calgary, Alberta. Created in 1941, the title is extinct, the last and only holder being Richard Bedford Bennett.

Members of the Canadian royal family, other than the sovereign, also hold peerages, though these were granted by letters patent issued by the sovereign of the United Kingdom and are used in Canada as courtesy titles. Further, Sylvana Tomaselli, a Canadian citizen, has been known as Countess of St. Andrews since her marriage to George Windsor, who uses the courtesy title Earl of St. Andrews, a subsidiary title of his father, Prince Edward, Duke of Kent, a grandson of King George V. Upon the death of the Duke of Kent, is it expected that George will succeed to the title and Sylvana will become Duchess of Kent, Countess of St. Andrews, and Baroness Downpatrick, though her eldest son, Edward, also a citizen of Canada and the present Lord Downpatrick, and his wife, if any, will then use the titles Earl and Countess of St. Andrews as a courtesy title and their eldest son, if any, would be known as Lord Downpatrick. Also, Karen Gordon, a Canadian citizen, became the Countess Spencer upon her marriage in 2011 to the Earl Spencer, brother of Diana, Princess of Wales.

There are also 120 Baronets of Nova Scotia. Created between 1625 and 1706, these baronets technically represent the baronets of Canada.

== Arms, flags, and badges ==
The Canadian Heraldic Authority, which grants armorial bearings (coats of arms), flags, and badges to Canadian citizens, permanent residents, and corporate bodies, forms a part of the Canadian honours system; the granting of arms is regarded as an honour from the monarch, via the governor general, and thus are bestowed only on those whom the Chief Herald has deemed individuals worthy of receiving a grant of arms.

== See also ==
- Canadian order of precedence (decorations and medals)
- List of Canadian awards
- List of awards presented by the governor general of Canada
- List of post-nominal letters in Canada
- Commonwealth realms orders and decorations
- Queen's Scarf
- 1946 New Year Honours (Canada)
- 2017 Canada Day Honours
- 2018 New Year Honours (Canada)
- 2018 Canada Day Honours
- 2019 New Year Honours (Canada)
- 2019 Canada Day Honours
- 2020 New Year Honours (Canada)
- 2021 Canadian Honours List
