= Corrections Exemplary Service Medal =

Canadian service medal

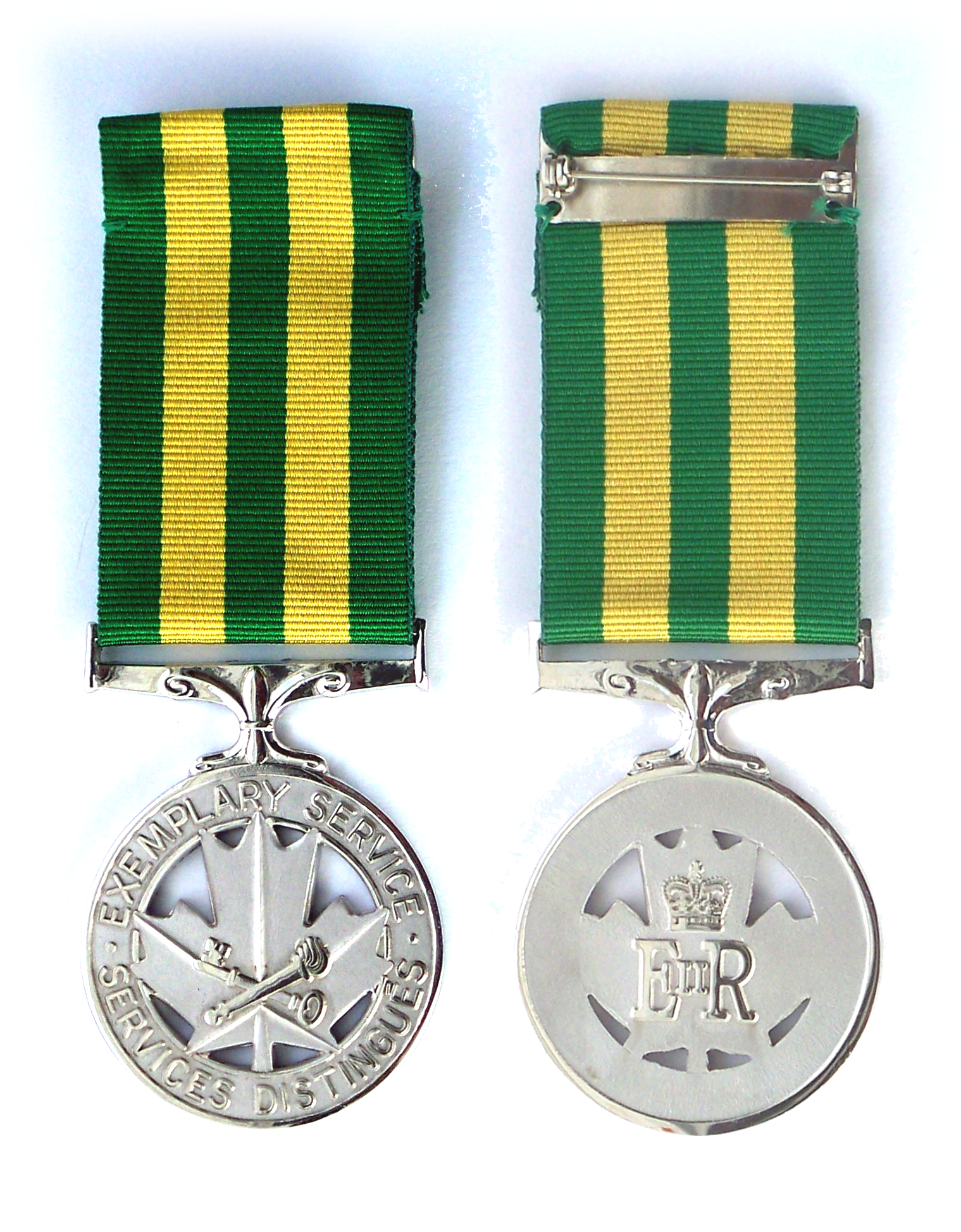
- Obverse and reverse of the medal
- Type: Long Service Medal
- Awarded for: 20 years of service
- Presented by: The monarch of Canada
- Eligibility: Canadian correctional services employees
- Status: Currently awarded
- Established: 11 June 1984
- Ribbon bar

Precedence
- Next (higher): Police Exemplary Service Medal
- Next (lower): Fire Services Exemplary Service Medal

The Corrections Exemplary Service Medal (French: Médaille pour services distingués en milieu correctionnel) is a Canadian service medal for correctional officers and employees.

It is, within the Canadian system of honours, the second highest of the exemplary service medals.

To qualify for this medal the recipient has to meet the following criteria:

- 20 years of full-time (but not necessarily consecutive) service in a Canadian correctional service.
- 10 years service as a peace officer in a correctional facility, as a probation officer, as a parole officer, or in another position that brought the recipient into contact with offenders on a regular basis.
- Has not received another decoration from the Crown for this service.
- Has, during the 20 years of service, conducted themselves in an exemplary manner, characterized by good conduct, industry and efficiency.

== Appearance ==
The Corrections Exemplary Service Medal is circular, made of silver coloured metal, 36 millimetres (1.4 in) in diameter. The obverse of the medal depicts a maple leaf containing a crossed torch and key superimposed upon the centre of the metal. Circumscribed around the medal are the words Exemplary Service – Services Distingués. The areas between the edge of the medal and the maple leaf are cut out. The reverse depicts the crowned cypher of the monarch. The recipient's name is engraved on the edge of the medal.

The medal is suspended by a stylized inverted fleur-de-lis on a straight suspension bar. The ribbon of the medal is green, 32 millimetres (1.3 in) wide, with two stripes of gold separating the ribbon into five equal vertical stripes.

Each additional 10-year period of full-time service may qualify recipients for award of a bar to the medal. The bar is silver and bears a stylized maple leaf. When only wearing the ribbon bar, a small silver maple leaf is worn to represent award of the bar.
