= Canadian Corps of Commissionaires =

Canadian security firm

Commissionaires Canada is a Canadian security firm, originally established to provide employment to ex-servicemen.

== History ==
Modeled after the British Corps of Commissionaires, the Canadian Corps was formed in 1925 with the opening of offices in Montreal, Toronto and Vancouver. A national organization was realized by 1950 with the opening of the office in St. John's, Newfoundland and Labrador. In 1982, the Canadian Corps had grown to more than 10,000 employees, which virtually doubled the complement of its British parent.

To meet its growing demands for personnel after the September 11 attacks in 2001, Commissionaires began accepting civilians. While in today's organization not all Commissionaires are veterans of the Canadian Armed Forces or Royal Canadian Mounted Police service, the organization's mandate still is to provide meaningful employment to veterans. A significant proportion of their current members are veterans and the Corps hires about 1,200 veterans every year. As of 2022, Commissionaires employs over 23,000 people with offices operating in all ten provinces and three territories.

== Role ==
Members of the Corps are often used as trained security guards in major companies and other organizations. The main role of a Commissionaire is the protection of people, property and information. Commissionaires are found in many federal establishments across Canada guarding everything from museum pieces to live ammunition and government files. In addition to security guard duties, some Commissionaires are trained to perform fingerprinting service for the federal government.

After 12 years service a member is eligible for the Commissionaires Long Service Medal. Additionally, both Distinguished Service and Meritorious Service medals may be awarded when approved by the area office and the Commissionaire national office.

== See also ==
- Black-Binney House
