= Canadian Coast Guard Exemplary Service Medal =

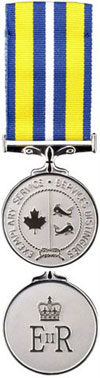
- Obverse and reverse of the medal
- Type: Service medal
- Awarded for: 20 years' service in the Canadian Coast Guard or a supporting organisation
- Presented by: The monarch of Canada
- Status: Currently awarded
- Established: 14 March 1991

Precedence
- Next (higher): Fire Services Exemplary Service Medal
- Next (lower): Emergency Medical Services Exemplary Service Medal

The Canadian Coast Guard Exemplary Service Medal (French: Médaille pour services distingués de la Garde côtière canadienne) is a service medal created in 1991 by the Canadian monarch-in-Council to recognize members of the Canadian Coast Guard or a supporting organisation who had served for 20 years, 10 years of which was spent in operations that involved possible personal risk. It is, within the Canadian system of honours, the third lowest of the exemplary service medals.

== Design ==
The Canadian Coast Guard Exemplary Service Medal is in the form of a 36 millimetres (1.4 in) diameter cupro-nickel disc with, on the obverse, the crest of the Canadian Coast Guard surrounded by the words EXEMPLARY SERVICE • SERVICES DISTINGUÉS. On the reverse is the Royal Cypher of Queen Elizabeth II beneath a St. Edward's Crown, symbolizing the Queen's role as fount of honour.

This medallion is worn at the left chest, suspended on a 31.8mm wide blue ribbon with a thin, vertical white stripe in the centre, flanked by two wider stripes in yellow; these colours reflect those used in the Coast Guard's crest.

== Eligibility and receipt ==
On 14 March 1991, Queen Elizabeth II, on the advice of her Cabinet under Prime Minister Brian Mulroney, created the Canadian Coast Guard Exemplary Service Medal to recognize members of the Canadian Coast Guard or any supporting organisation who have served full-time for a minimum of 20 years, including 10 years participating in operations with the possibility of personal risk, and have demonstrated good conduct, industriousness, and efficiency. A bar, bearing a maple leaf in silver, is given for each additional 10 years served, and the medal can be awarded posthumously.

== See also ==
- Canadian order of precedence (decorations and medals)
- Sea Service Ribbon
