= Peace Officer Exemplary Service Medal =

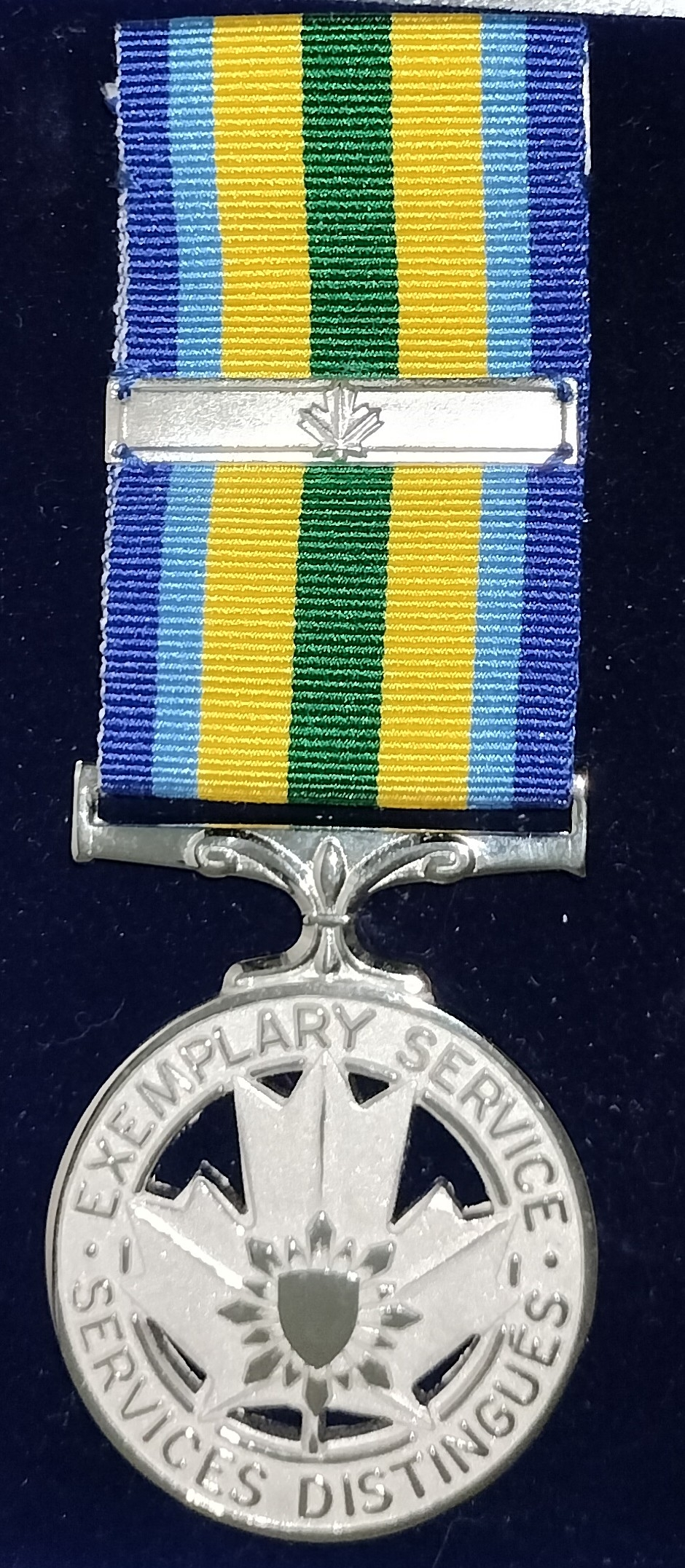
- Type: Long Service Medal
- Awarded for: 20 years of service
- Presented by: The monarch of Canada
- Eligibility: Peace Officers serving in a listed organization and approved by the Advisory Committee
- Clasps: Bars awarded for every 10 years thereafter
- Status: Currently awarded
- Established: 22 June 2004
- Ribbon bar

Precedence
- Next (higher): Emergency Medical Services Exemplary Service Medal
- Next (lower): Queen's Medal for Champion Shot

The Peace Officer Exemplary Service Medal (French: La Médaille pour services distingués des agents de la paix) is a Canadian service medal for peace officers. The medal honours 20 years of exemplary service by peace officers as designated by the governor general. It is, within the Canadian system of honours, the sixth and newest of the exemplary service medals.

== Award criteria ==
The award of the Peace Officer Exemplary Service Medal is governed by an Advisory Committee, appointed by the Governor General of Canada, made up from a representative from each organization with personnel eligible for the medal. This committee ensures that personnel nominated for the medal meet all of the criteria for award, as spelled out by regulation, before forwarding the nomination to the Chancellery of Honours.

Peace officers are eligible for award of the Exemplary Service Medal if they meet various criteria. First among the criteria is the requirement that the employee of an approved organization was actively serving on or after 22 September 1998, and has completed at least twenty years of service with one or more approved organizations. Eligible periods of service must include protecting the safety and security of Canada, with at least ten years served as a peace officer serving at potential risk as determined by the Advisory Committee. The recognized period of service of a nominee for the medal must be of a character that no serious disciplinary action was taken against a nominee and none may be pending. Nominees are expected to have a record of exemplary service of a high standard warranting recognition. Those personnel who are already recipients of the Peace Officer Exemplary Service Medal, may be awarded a bar to the medal for ten additional years of qualifying service.

No period of service previously recognized by any other long service, good conduct or efficiency decoration or medal awarded by the Monarchy of Canada may be used for the award of the medal. However, full-time exemplary service in the Canadian Forces or in any other occupation eligible for award of an Exemplary Service Medal may count as qualifying service, if the service has not been previously recognized.

=== Extraordinary award criteria ===
The Advisory Committee may recommend an award of the Peace Officer Exemplary Service Medal to the Governor General under extraordinary circumstances. The subject of this recommendation need not meet the criteria of length of service. This recommendation may be for a posthumous award, if the person died in the line of duty and was not the recipient of any other award from the Monarchy of Canada directly related to the circumstances of his or her death.

=== Eligible organizations ===
The Governor General maintains a list of organizations eligible to present the Peace Officer Exemplary Service Medal to its personnel. The Advisory Committee may also recommend adding any other federal or provincial organization employing peace officers. The following organizations are eligible to present the medal:

- Alberta Solicitor General and Public Security, Sheriffs Branch
- British Columbia Ministry of Attorney General, Sheriff Service
- Canada Border Services Agency
- Department of Citizenship and Immigration
- Department of the Environment
- Department of Fisheries and Oceans
- Environment Yukon – Conservation Officers
- Manitoba Sheriff Service
- Ministère de la Sécurité publique du Québec, Direction des services de sécurité et de protection (DSSP)
- RCMP (Auxiliary Constables only)
- Ontario Provincial Police Special Constables
- Ontario Ministry of the Environment – Environmental Officers
- Ontario Ministry of Natural Resources – Conservation Officers
- Ontario Ministry of Transportation – Transportation Enforcement Officers
- Parks Canada Agency
- Any federal or provincial organization recommended by the Advisory Committee, that employs peace officers.

== Appearance ==
The Peace Officer Exemplary Service Medal is circular, made of silver colored metal, 36 millimetres (1.4 in) in diameter. The obverse of the medal depicts a maple leaf with a star and shield superimposed upon the center. Circumscribed around the medal are the words Exemplary Service – Services Distingués. The areas between the edge of the medal and the maple leaf are cut out. The reverse depicts the crowned cypher of the monarch. The recipients name is engraved on the edge of the medal.

The medal is suspended by a stylized inverted fleur-de-lis on a straight suspension bar. The ribbon of the medal is 32 millimetres (1.3 in) wide and with a central dark green stripe, bordered by gold, then bordered by a thinner stripe of light blue and a thinner stripe of dark blue at the edges.

== See also ==
- Canadian order of precedence (decorations and medals)
