= Emergency Medical Services Exemplary Service Medal =

- Type: Long Service Medal
- Awarded for: 20 years of service
- Presented by: The monarch of Canada
- Eligibility: Emergency medical service personnel
- Status: Currently awarded
- Established: 7 July 1994
- Ribbon bar

Precedence
- Next (higher): Canadian Coast Guard Exemplary Service Medal
- Next (lower): Peace Officer Exemplary Service Medal

The Emergency Medical Services Exemplary Service Medal (French: Médaille pour services distingués des services d'urgence médicale) is a Canadian service medal for Emergency medical service personnel. The medal honours 20 years of exemplary service by professional pre-hospital emergency medical service personnel. It is, within the Canadian system of honours, the fifth of the exemplary service medals.

== See also ==
- Canadian order of precedence (decorations and medals)
