= Fire Services Exemplary Service Medal =

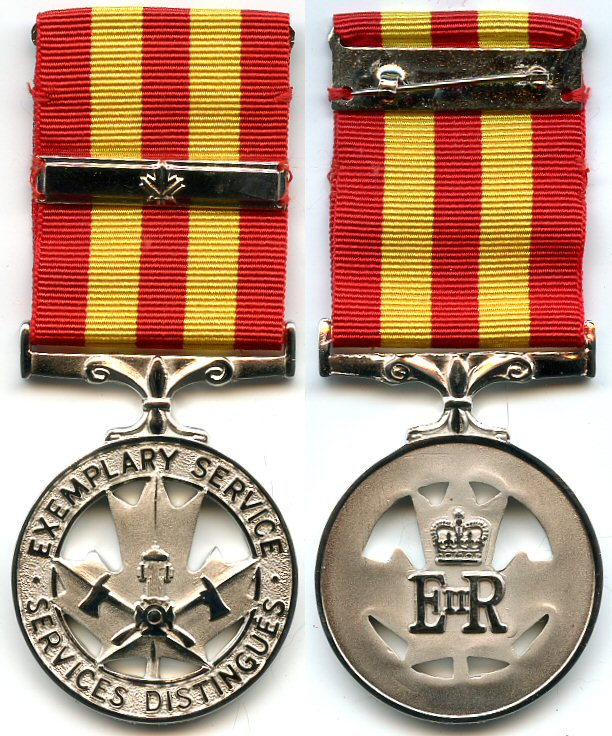
- Obverse and reverse of the medal (with bar)
- Type: Long service medal
- Awarded for: 20 years' service in a recognized Canadian fire service
- Presented by: The monarch of Canada
- Status: Currently awarded
- Established: 29 August 1985

Precedence
- Next (higher): Corrections Exemplary Service Medal
- Next (lower): Canadian Coast Guard Exemplary Service Medal

The Fire Services Exemplary Service Medal (French: Médaille de pompiers pour services distingués) is a service medal created in 1985 by the Canadian monarch-in-Council. The medal recognizes members of recognized Canadian fire services who had served for 20 years, ten years of which have been served in the performance of duties involving potential risks. A bar, bearing a maple leaf in silver, is given for each additional 10 years served. The medal is awarded by the Chancellery of Canadian Orders.

== Description ==
The Fire Services Exemplary Service Medal is circular medal made of silver coloured metal. The obverse of the medal depicts a fire hydrant with crossed axes and a Maltese Cross centred on a stylized maple leaf. Circumscribed around the maple leaf are the words EXEMPLARY SERVICE • SERVICES DISTINGUÉS. The reverse bears the Royal Cipher. The Medal is suspended by a ribbon of five equal stripes three red and two gold.

Subsequent awards of the medal are denoted by a plain silver bar with a maple leaf in the centre, attached to the medal's suspension ribbon. When worn as an undress ribbon individuals who have been awarded a bar to the medal indicate this by wearing a silver maple leaf on the centre of the ribbon.

== See also ==
- Canadian order of precedence (decorations and medals)
