= 2018 Canadian honours =

Canadian government recognitions

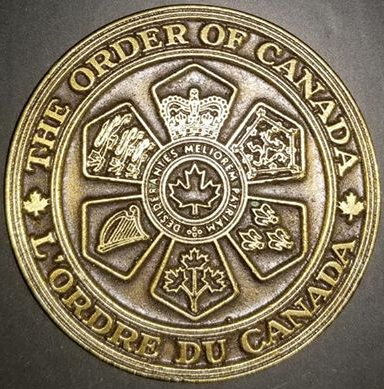
The Seal of the Order of Canada

The following are the appointments to various Canadian Honours of 2018. Usually, they are announced as part of the New Year and Canada Day celebrations and are published within the Canada Gazette during year. This follows the custom set out within the United Kingdom which publishes its appoints of various British Honours for New Year's and for monarch's official birthday. However, instead of the midyear appointments announced on Victoria Day, the official birthday of the Canadian Monarch, this custom has been transferred with the celebration of Canadian Confederation and the creation of the Order of Canada

However, as the Canada Gazette publishes appointment to various orders, decorations and medal, either Canadian or from Commonwealth and foreign states, this article will reference all Canadians so honoured during the 2018 calendar year.

Provincial and Territorial Honours are not listed within the Canada Gazette, however they are listed within the various publications of each provincial government. Provincial and territorial honours are listed within the page.

== The Order of Canada ==
=== Companions of the Order of Canada ===
Undress ribbon of a Companion of the Order of Canada

- The Honourable Thomas Cromwell, C.C.
- Frank C. Hawthorne, C.C. - This is a promotion within the Order
- The Honourable Louis LeBel, C.C.
- Cornelia Hahn Oberlander, C.C., O.B.C. - This is a promotion within the Order
- Roberta Lynn Bondar, C.C., O.Ont.
- The Right Honourable Beverley McLachlin, P.C., C.C.
- Lorne Michaels, C.C.

=== Honorary Officer of the Order of Canada ===
- Neil G. Turok, O.C.

=== Officers of the Order of Canada ===
Undress ribbon of an Officer of the Order of Canada

- Paul W. Armstrong, O.C.
- Sally Armstrong, O.C.
- Michael Anthony Church, O.C.
- May Cohen, O.C.
- François Crépeau, O.C.
- Sophie D'Amours, O.C.
- Elizabeth Ann Eisenhauer, O.C.
- Brigitte Haentjens, O.C.
- Keith Hipel, O.C.
- Carol Hopkins, O.C.
- Sajeev John, O.C.
- Robert Joseph, O.C., O.B.C.
- Louie Kamookak, O.C.
- Raymond Laflamme, O.C.
- Mary Law, O.C.
- Kenneth Lum, O.C.
- Alberto Manguel, O.C.
- Lee Maracle, O.C.
- Émile Martel, O.C.
- Joseph B. Martin, O.C.
- Anne Martin-Matthews, O.C.
- Terence Matthews, O.C.
- Sylvain Moineau, O.C.
- André Parent, O.C., O.Q.
- Rose Patten, O.C.
- Ivan Barry Pless, O.C.- This is a promotion within the Order
- Brian Robertson, O.C.
- R. Kerry Rowe, O.C.
- Michael Sefton, O.C.
- William Shatner, O.C.
- Molly S. Shoichet, O.C., O.Ont.
- David Sinclair, O.C.
- Vianne Timmons, O.C.
- Denis Villeneuve, O.C.
- Janet F. Werker, O.C.
- Christiane Ayotte, O.C.
- The Honourable Perrin Beatty, P.C., O.C.
- Chantal Benoit, O.C.
- Lise Bissonnette, O.C., O.Q.
- Cindy Blackstock, O.C.
- Alain Bouchard, O.C., O.Q.
- Gertrude Bourdon, O.C.
- Gordon Muir Campbell, O.C., O.B.C.
- Matthew Coon Come, O.C.
- Wendy Marion Craig, O.C., O.Ont.
- Suzanne Fortier, O.C.
- Sheila Fraser, O.C.
- Julia Gersovitz, O.C.
- Jane Green, O.C., O.N.L.
- Deanna Hamilton, O.C.
- Patricia Meirion Moore, O.C.
- Louise Nadeau, O.C., C.Q.
- Annette M. O'Connor, O.C.
- Peter Henry St George-Hyslop, O.C.

=== Members of the Order of Canada ===
Undress ribbon for a Member of the Order of Canada

- Allan Andrews, C.M.
- Jann Arden Richards, C.M.
- Mary Pat Armstrong, C.M.
- Marilyn Baillie, C.M.
- Réal Bérard, C.M.
- Harry Bone, C.M.
- Abel Bosum, C.M.
- Jacques Boucher, C.M.
- Mark Breslin, C.M.
- Janine Brodie, C.M.
- Helen Burstyn, C.M.
- Alain Caron, C.M.
- The Honourable Andrée Champagne, P.C., C.M.
- Léonie Couture, C.M., C.Q.
- Martha Crago, C.M.
- David Crate, C.M.
- Elizabeth Cromwell, C.M.
- Marie Yvonne Delorme, C.M.
- Gaston Déry, C.M.
- Jean Pierre Desrosiers, C.M.
- Richard Dicerni, C.M.
- Stephanie Dixon, C.M.
- Joyce Doolittle, C.M.
- Jocelyn Downie, C.M.
- Gérard Duhaime, C.M.
- James Eetoolook, C.M.
- Lynn Factor, C.M.
- Thomas Erskine Feasby, C.M.
- Saul Feldberg, C.M.
- Geoffrey Roy Fernie, C.M.
- Carlo Fidani, C.M.
- Saul Fisher, C.M.
- Peter John Fowler, C.M.
- Oliver Gannon, C.M.
- Howard Vance Gimbel, C.M., A.O.E.
- Martin Gleave, C.M.
- Minnie Grey, C.M., C.Q.
- Curtis Harnett, C.M.
- Norman E. Hébert, C.M.
- Richard Henriquez, C.M.
- John W. Hilborn, C.M.
- Josie Hill, C.M.
- Robert Hogg, C.M.
- Judy Illes, C.M.
- Bruce Kirby, C.M.
- Dale H. Lastman, C.M.
- Jeanette Corbiere Lavell, C.M.
- Joseph Lebovic, C.M.
- Wolf Lebovic, C.M.
- John Lord, C.M.
- Roland François Mahé, C.M., O.M.
- André Maltais, C.M.
- Catherine Anne Martin, C.M.
- Marie Mc Andrew, C.M.
- Karen Rochelle Mock, C.M.
- Raymond Murphy, C.M., O.P.E.I.
- Karim Wade Nasser, C.M., S.O.M.
- Nancy Neamtan, C.M., O.Q.
- Barbara Neis, C.M.
- Michel Noel, C.M., C.Q.
- Harold Walter Orr, C.M.
- Stephen Anderson Otto, C.M.
- Madeleine Paquin, C.M.
- Marcelline Picard, C.M., C.Q.
- Kathleen Isabel Pritchard, C.M.
- Andrew Qappik, C.M.
- Ahmet Fuad Sahin, C.M., O.Ont.
- Beverley Noel Salmon, C.M., O.Ont.
- Frederick Sasakamoose, C.M.
- Judith Sayers, C.M.
- Eric Schloss, C.M.
- Bernard Sherman, C.M.
- Ernest Small, C.M.
- Gregory Smallenberg, C.M.
- Claude Snow, C.M., O.N.B.
- Douglas Stenton, C.M.
- Basil Leo Stewart, C.M.
- Gordon Stobbe, C.M.
- Sylvia Sweeney, C.M.
- Jacob Howard Switzer, C.M.
- Valerie Tryon, C.M.
- Christl Verduyn, C.M.
- John Emment Walsh, C.M.
- Barbara Jean Weihs, C.M.
- David Werklund, C.M., A.O.E.
- Calvin A. White, C.M., O.N.L.
- Andrea Baumann, C.M.
- Mohit Bhandari, C.M.
- Eli Bornstein, C.M., S.O.M.
- Robert Bothwell, C.M.
- Hédi Bouraoui, C.M.
- Beverley Busson, C.M., C.O.M., O.B.C.
- Barry Callaghan, C.M.
- David R. Cameron, C.M.
- John Conly, C.M.
- Francis R. Cook, C.M.
- Thomas d'Aquino, C.M.
- Gary Michael Dault, C.M.
- W. Dale Dauphinee, C.M.
- Marie-Anne Day Walker-Pelletier, C.M.
- Nan-b de Gaspé Beaubien, C.M.
- M. Jamal Deen, C.M.
- Allan Steven Detsky, C.M.
- Agnes Di Leonardi, C.M.
- Peter J. Dillon, C.M.
- Jim Estill, C.M., O.Ont.
- Arthur Fogel, C.M.
- David Glenn Fountain, C.M.
- David Fox, C.M.
- Abraham Fuks, C.M.
- Patricia (Patsy) Gallant, C.M.
- Laurier Gareau, C.M.
- Edward H. Garrard, C.M.
- Jack Gauldie, C.M.
- Nahum Gelber, C.M.
- Jack Douglas Gerrow, C.M.
- The Honourable Ronald D. Ghitter, C.M.
- Lieutenant-Colonel (Retired) Stéphane Grenier, C.M., M.S.C., C.D.
- Mitchell Halperin, C.M.
- Peter Irwin, C.M.
- Beverley K. Jacobs, C.M.
- David Trent Jaeger, C.M.
- Rebecca Jamieson, C.M.
- Virendra K. Jha, C.M.
- K. Wayne Johnston, C.M.
- David I. Kent, C.M.
- Dianne Kipnes, C.M.
- Irving Kipnes, C.M., A.O.E.
- Jack Kitts, C.M.
- Jonathan Klassen, C.M.
- Burton Kramer, C.M., O.Ont.
- Alan Latourelle, C.M.
- Gilles Lavigne, C.M.
- Jean-Pierre Léger, C.M.
- Rhéal Leroux, C.M., O.Ont.
- Paul-André Linteau, C.M., C.Q.
- Jon E. Love, C.M.
- Timothy E. MacDonald, C.M.
- Gabor Maté, C.M.
- Seana McKenna, C.M.
- Bruce McManus, C.M.
- Edmund Metatawabin, C.M.
- Morton S. Minc, C.M.
- David Morley, C.M.
- Frances Olson, C.M.
- Hilary Pearson, C.M.
- Sherry Porter, C.M.
- The Honourable Lucienne Robillard, P.C., C.M.
- Calin Rovinescu, C.M.
- Jean-Claude Savoie, C.M., O.N.B.
- Sharon Sholzberg-Gray, C.M.
- Yvonne Steinert, C.M.
- Veronica Jane Strong-Boag, C.M.
- Mutsumi Takahashi, C.M.
- Bryce Taylor, C.M.
- Mark Thompson, C.M.
- Scott Thornley, C.M.
- Michael J. Tims, C.M.
- Mohamed Lamine Touré, C.M., C.Q.
- Dave Toycen, C.M., O.Ont.
- Aritha van Herk, C.M.
- James Patterson Waddell, C.M.
- Elizabeth Hillman Waterston, C.M., O.Ont.
- Barry Wellar, C.M.
- Marjorie White, C.M., O.B.C.
- Ronald Franklin Williams, C.M.
- Gerald Wood, C.M.
- Yiyan Wu, C.M.

== Order of Military Merit ==
=== Termination of appointments of the Order of Military Merit ===
- Master Warrant Officer William Edward Lang, C.D. (Retired)

=== Commanders of the Order of Military Merit ===
Undress ribbon for a Commander of the Order of Military Merit

- Rear-Admiral Darren Carl Hawco, C.M.M., M.S.M., C.D.
- Major-General Jean-Marc Lanthier, C.M.M., M.S.C., M.S.M., C.D. - This is a promotion within the Order
- Major-General Omer Henry Lavoie, C.M.M., M.S.C., C.D. - This is a promotion within the Order
- Major-General Alexander Donald Meinzinger, C.M.M., M.S.M., C.D. - This is a promotion within the Order
- Major-General Michael Norman Rouleau, C.M.M., M.S.C., C.D. - This is a promotion within the Order

=== Officers of the Order of Military Merit ===
Undress ribbon for an Officer of the Order of Military Merit

- Lieutenant-Colonel Joseph Léo Cédric Aspirault, O.M.M., C.D.
- Lieutenant-Colonel Brook Garrett Bangsboll, O.M.M., C.D.
- Lieutenant-Colonel Claire Katherine Bramma, O.M.M., C.D.
- Brigadier-General Joseph Jean Guy Chapdelaine, O.M.M., C.D.
- Lieutenant-Colonel Ryan Glen Deming, O.M.M., C.D.
- Colonel Robert Bernard Dundon, O.M.M., C.D.
- Colonel Iain Stewart Huddleston, O.M.M., C.D.
- Major Trevor Jain, O.M.M., M.S.M., C.D.
- Lieutenant-Colonel Jason Gabriel Langelier, O.M.M., C.D.
- Captain(N) Marie-France Langlois, O.M.M., C.D.
- Colonel Christian Joseph Bernard Mercier, O.M.M., M.S.M., C.D.
- Colonel Joseph John Conrad Mialkowski, O.M.M., M.S.C., C.D.
- Major Richard Andrew Havelock Nicholson, O.M.M., C.D.
- Captain(N) Rebecca Louise Patterson, O.M.M., M.S.M., C.D.
- Colonel Robert Tennant Ritchie, O.M.M., M.S.M., C.D.
- Colonel Marie Diane Josée Robidoux, O.M.M., C.D.
- Captain(N) Christopher Allan Robinson, O.M.M., C.D.
- Lieutenant-Colonel Marcy Ellen Spiers, O.M.M., C.D.
- Commodore Angus Ian Topshee, O.M.M., M.S.M., C.D.
- Lieutenant-Colonel Dallas Jay West, O.M.M., C.D.
- Captain(N) Douglas Michael Charles Young, O.M.M., M.S.M., C.D.

=== Members of the Order of Military Merit ===
Undress ribbon for a Member of the Order of Military Merit

- Ranger Cyril Abbott, M.M.M., C.D.
- Chief Petty Officer 2nd Class André Lionel Aubry, M.M.M., M.B., C.D.
- Master Warrant Officer Joseph Martin Claude Bédard, M.M.M., M.S.C., C.D.
- Warrant Officer Sean Eldon Benedict, M.M.M., C.D.
- Chief Petty Officer 1st Class Marc Thomas Bertrand, M.M.M., C.D.
- Sergeant Marie Stella Thérèse Geneviève Blouin, M.M.M., C.D.
- Master Warrant Officer Cordell James Herman Boland, M.M.M., C.D.
- Master Warrant Officer Dean Stanley Burgher, M.M.M., C.D.
- Warrant Officer Aaron David Bygrove, M.M.M., M.S.M., C.D.
- Sergeant Marie Rollande Isabelle Caya, M.M.M., C.D.
- Chief Warrant Officer Joseph Guy Alain Richmond Champagne, M.M.M., M.S.M., C.D.
- Warrant Officer Geoffrey Howard Chin, M.M.M., C.D.
- Chief Warrant Officer Claude Rodney Cromwell, M.M.M., C.D.
- Chief Petty Officer 1st Class Robert Raymond DeProy, M.M.M., M.B., C.D.
- Warrant Officer Hugo Dany Deshaye, M.M.M., C.D.
- Warrant Officer Christopher Lee Desjardins, M.M.M., C.D.
- Chief Warrant Officer Sophie Marie Patricia Desjardins, M.M.M., C.D.
- Sergeant Michel Doyon, M.M.M., C.D.
- Master Warrant Officer Francis Stephen Dwyer, M.M.M., C.D.
- Chief Warrant Officer Desmond Michael Flood, M.M.M., C.D.
- Warrant Officer Lorilee Ann Flowers, M.M.M., C.D.
- Warrant Officer Jason Edward Forth, M.M.M., C.D.
- Warrant Officer Robert Glenn Arthur Fox, M.M.M., C.D.
- Master Warrant Officer Terry Hans Fraser, M.M.M., C.D.
- Chief Warrant Officer Leslie Darrell Frowen, M.M.M., C.D.
- Chief Warrant Officer Marie Solange Isabelle Galbrand, M.M.M., C.D.
- Chief Petty Officer 1st Class Bradley Gale, M.M.M., C.D.
- Chief Petty Officer 1st Class Joseph Claude Michel Giguère, M.M.M., C.D.
- Master Warrant Officer Gerrit Ted Gombert, M.M.M., C.D.
- Master Warrant Officer Eileen Elizabeth Hannigan, M.M.M., C.D.
- Sergeant Helen Ruth Hawes, M.M.M., C.D.
- Master Warrant Officer Michael Henry Hawthorn, M.M.M., C.D.
- Master Warrant Officer Ronald Michael James Heffernan, M.M.M., C.D.
- Warrant Officer Christopher Hennebery, M.M.M., C.D.
- Sergeant Lejla Imamovic, M.M.M., C.D.
- Warrant Officer Warren Bradley James, M.M.M., C.D.
- Sergeant Andréanne Lise Micheline Joly, M.M.M., C.D.
- Warrant Officer Penny Christina Kennedy, M.M.M., C.D.
- Chief Warrant William Lloyd King, M.M.M., C.D.
- Chief Warrant Officer Joseph Roger Dominic Lapointe, M.M.M., C.D.
- Chief Warrant Officer Blair William Leahy, M.M.M., C.D.
- Major Marylin Suzanne Lemay, M.M.M., C.D.
- Major Slade Gestur John Lerch, M.M.M., C.D.
- Major James Edward Rene Macinnis, M.M.M., C.D.
- Master Warrant Officer John MacKenzie, M.M.M., C.D.
- Warrant Officer Joseph Dany Martin, M.M.M., C.D.
- Warrant Officer Richard John Martin, M.M.M., C.D.
- Chief Warrant Officer Joseph Serge Masson, M.M.M., C.D.
- Master Warrant Officer Suzanne Joyce McAdam, M.M.M., C.D.
- Warrant Officer James McCarron, M.M.M., C.D.
- Warrant Officer Michael Melvin, M.M.M., C.D.
- Master Warrant Officer Morris Henry McGarrigle, M.M.M., C.D.
- Master Warrant Officer James Allan McKenzie, M.M.M., C.D.
- Sergeant Timothy Charles McLean, M.M.M., C.D.
- Major Jennifer Lynn Morrison, M.M.M., C.D.
- Warrant Officer Rebekah Dawn Neville, M.M.M., C.D.
- Captain Brigitte Noël, M.M.M., C.D.
- Chief Warrant Officer Kelly James Parent, M.M.M., C.D.
- Chief Petty Officer 2nd Class Paul Andrew Joseph Parent, M.M.M., C.D.
- Chief Warrant Officer Joseph Yves Éric Poissant, M.M.M., C.D.
- Master Warrant Officer Leonard Andrew Power, M.M.M., C.D.
- Master Warrant Officer Marie Ginette Isabelle Proulx, M.M.M., C.D.
- Master Warrant Officer David Michael Andrew Ridley, M.M.M., C.D.
- Master Warrant Officer Christopher Allan Rigby, M.M.M., C.D.
- Chief Warrant Officer Joseph André Daniel Royer, M.M.M., C.D.
- Chief Petty Officer 2nd Class Marie Nathalie Isabelle Scalabrini, M.M.M., C.D.
- Petty Officer 1st Class Ginette Suzanne Marie Seguin, M.M.M., C.D.
- Chief Warrant Officer Mark Shannon, M.M.M., C.D.
- Chief Petty Officer 2nd Class Stephen James Sheffar, M.M.M., C.D.
- Major Derek John Sheridan, M.M.M., C.D.
- Lieutenant Martin Simard, M.M.M., C.D.
- Warrant Officer Stephen Alan Slade, M.M.M., C.D.
- Sergeant Roxane St. Michael, M.M.M., C.D.
- Master Warrant Officer Martin Sylvestre, M.M.M., C.D.
- Chief Warrant Officer Michael Brian Talty, M.M.M., C.D.
- Chief Petty Officer 2nd Class Joseph André Steve Turgeon, M.M.M., C.D.
- Warrant Officer Joel Kevin Turnbull, M.M.M., C.D.
- Petty Officer 1st Class Robert Jerome Williams, M.M.M., C.D.

== Order of Merit of the Police Forces ==
=== Commander of the Order of Merit of the Police Forces ===
Undress ribbon of a Commander of the Order of Merit of the Police Forces

- Commissioner Brenda Lucki, C.O.M. - This is a promotion within the Order

=== Officers of the Order of Merit of the Police Forces ===
Undress ribbon of an Officer of the Order of Merit of the Police Forces

- Chief Superintendent Jeffrey Joseph Adam, O.O.M.
- Deputy Commissioner Rick Barnum, O.O.M. - This is a promotion within the Order
- Deputy Commissioner Brenda Butterworth-Carr, O.O.M. - This is a promotion within the Order
- Chief Constable Neil Dubord, O.O.M. - This is a promotion within the Order
- Deputy Chief Jacques Duchesneau, O.O.M.
- Assistant Commissioner Barbara A. S. Fleury, O.O.M.
- Chief Kai Liu, O.O.M. - This is a promotion within the Order
- Deputy Director General Yves Morency, O.O.M.
- Chief Murray Cecil Rodd, O.O.M. - This is a promotion within the Order

=== Members of the Order of Merit of the Police Forces ===
Undress ribbon of a Member of the Order of Merit of the Police Forces

- Sergeant Chris Amell, M.O.M.
- Inspector Shawna E. Baher, M.O.M.
- Superintendent Marc Maurice Bedard, M.O.M.
- Staff Sergeant Donald Edward Bill, M.O.M.
- Chief Brent Ivan Blackmore, M.O.M.
- Superintendent Edward Boettcher, M.O.M.
- Deputy Director General Sylvain Caron, M.O.M.
- Deputy Chief Kevin A. Chalk, M.O.M.
- Deputy Chief Constable Howard Chow, M.O.M.
- Inspector Gordon Frederick Cobey, M.O.M.
- Staff Sergeant Diane L. Cockle, M.O.M.
- Staff Sergeant Stephen T. Conohan, M.O.M.
- Deputy Chief Paul Cook, M.O.M.
- Chief Superintendent Roseanne DiMarco, M.O.M.
- Staff Sergeant Duncan Edward Dixon, M.O.M.
- Superintendent Steve Eely, M.O.M.
- Chief Superintendent Mark John Fisher, M.O.M.
- Superintendent Marcelle M. Flamand, M.O.M.
- Chief Superintendent Paulette Bernadine Freill, M.O.M.
- Sergeant Luc Gagnon, M.O.M.
- Detective Inspector Shawn W. Glassford, M.O.M.
- Superintendent Marty Lang Kearns, M.O.M.
- Ms. Ann King, M.O.M.
- Inspector Eddie Kramer, M.O.M.
- Chief Superintendent Fernand S. Labelle, M.O.M.
- Chief Paul A. Ladouceur, M.O.M.
- Sergeant Michael B. Lamothe, M.O.M.
- Detective John Phillip Langford, M.O.M.
- Deputy Chief Jeffrey Douglas Littlewood, M.O.M.
- Superintendent Wade Daniel Lymburner, M.O.M.
- Chief Bryan Russell MacCulloch, M.O.M.
- Inspector Robyn Dawn MacEachern, M.O.M.
- Superintendent Paul Mackey, M.O.M.
- Chief David M. MacNeil, M.O.M.
- Constable Tad Kenneth Milmine, M.O.M.
- Inspector Mark D. Mitchell, M.O.M.
- Mr. William Moffat, M.O.M.
- Chief Kent D. Moore, M.O.M.
- Constable Michelle Mosher, M.O.M.
- Superintendent Christopher R. C. Newton, M.O.M.
- Inspector Wayne O. A. Nichols, M.O.M.
- Staff Sergeant Thomas Edward Norton, M.O.M.
- Deputy Chief Satpal Singh Parhar, M.O.M.
- Chief Superintendent Chesley Walter Parsons, M.O.M.
- Director Danny Paterson, M.O.M.
- Ms. Debra Diane Perry, M.O.M.
- Superintendent Lorne Edward Pike, M.O.M.
- Deputy Chief Robert John Gordon Ritchie, M.O.M.
- Superintendent Terrence M. Rocchio, M.O.M.
- Superintendent Manuel Rodrigues, M.O.M.
- Sergeant Nancy Rudback, M.O.M.
- Sergeant Peter Murray Sadler, M.O.M.
- Mr. Peter D. Shipley, M.O.M.
- Inspector Bruce D. Singer, M.O.M.
- Inspector Dan Smith, M.O.M.
- Superintendent Chad M. Tawfik, M.O.M.
- Assistant Commissioner Serge J. J. Therriault, M.O.M.
- Superintendent Mark VanZant, M.O.M.
- Deputy Chief Colin Watson, M.O.M.
- Chief Superintendent Ross Arthur White, M.O.M.
- Superintendent Brenda Young, M.O.M.
- Inspector Charles Young, M.O.M.
- Chief Dwayne Zacharie, M.O.M.

== Royal Victorian Order ==
Undress ribbon for all grades of the Royal Victorian Order

=== Commanders of the Royal Victorian Order ===
- Stephen Gregory Wallace (December 30, 2017)
- Galen Willard Gordon Weston, O.C., O.Ont. (December 30, 2017)

== Most Venerable Order of the Hospital of St. John of Jerusalem ==
Undress ribbon for all grades of the Most Venerable Order of the Hospital of St. John of Jerusalem

=== Knights and Dames of the Order of St. John ===
- Brian James Jerome Cole
- The Honourable Nellie Kusugak
- Keith Ernest Perron
- The Honourable Margaret Thom
- Richard MacDowell Dumbrille, C.M.
- His Honour The Honourable Arthur Joseph LeBlanc, O.N.S., Q.C.
- Thomas Craig Wilson
- His Honour The Honourable W. Thomas Molloy, O.C., S.O.M., Q.C.,
- Her Honour The Honourable Antoinette Perry, O.P.E.I.,

=== Commanders of the Order of St. John ===
- Roger Hétu, O.M.M., C.D.
- Shirley Ann Philpot
- Warrant Officer Marc Joseph Luc Boucher, M.M.M., C.D. AdeC
- The Honourable George Joseph Furey, Q.C.
- Charles McCormack, Georgetown, Ont.
- Warrant Officer Brent Kenneth Schriner, C.D.
- Scott Thomas Thistle, Paradise, N.L.

=== Officers of the Order of St. John ===
- Laurie Anne Anderson
- Lorne Dwight Clifford
- Michelle Elaine Covi Haswell
- Robin Ann Innes
- Patricia Gail Kipp
- Beverly Eileen Lafortune
- Grant Douglas MacDonald
- Gail Louise Bailey, Thunder Bay, Ont.
- N. Joel R. Campbell, Cambridge, Ont.
- Ian Joseph MacIntyre, Halifax, N.S.
- Ian Charles Steingaszner, Snowball, Ont.
- Robin D. Walker, Q.C., Toronto, Ont.

=== Members of the Order of St. John ===
- Teresa Jean-Baptiste Barton
- Timothy Bauer
- Sarah Joan Byram
- Irene Catherine Cicero
- Carolyn Kathleen Gosselin
- Lucie Houde
- Master Warrant Officer Stephen Lawrence Kern, C.D.
- Douglas David King
- Lieutenant-Colonel Franz Josef Kirk
- Bryce Sterling Kowalsky
- Saha Alex Maric
- Shawn Ian Mclaren
- Jay Christopher Noden
- Brady Joseph Ronald Poirier
- Janice Lynn Preiss
- Lieutenant Sean Paul Pretty, C.D., R.C.N.
- Benoit Rolland
- Richard Stewart
- Stan Stone
- Peter Alan Thompson
- Thomas Russel Walter
- Salvatore Abbruscato, Niagara Falls, Ont.
- Lieutenant (N) Christopher Russell Abram, Barrie, Ont.
- Mario Ancic, Kensington, P.E.I.
- Elizabeth Barlow, Victoria, B.C.
- Chad Alexander Belanger, Prescott, Ont.
- Martha Anne Cassidy, Yarmouth, N.S.
- Po Kwan Tara Chan, Vancouver, B.C.
- Jason Kin-Loon Cheng, Scarborough, Ont.
- Sergeant Stephen William Damery, Shilo, Man.
- Michel Doré, Montréal, Que.
- Teresa Geary, Brampton, Ont.
- Captain Maxime Hamel, Gatineau, Que.
- Elizabeth Rae Hartley, Nanaimo, B.C.
- Sandra Gail Hastie-Black, Thunder Bay, Ont.
- Sergeant Toni Lynne Hicks, Guelph, Ont.
- Polin Hung, Mississauga, Ont.
- David Jeong, Toronto, Ont.
- Robert Michael Koval, Barrie, Ont.
- Dany Levesque, Laval, Que.
- Judith Leslie Lister, Winnipeg, Man.
- Captain Kerry Mei Mark, Winnipeg, Man.
- Philip Mark, Winnipeg, Man.
- Mary Ellen Francis McQueen, Winnipeg, Man.
- Christina Jewel Motsch, Walkerton, Ont.
- Zachary Robert Roy Parrell, Portugal Cove, N.L.
- Anthony Rodrigo Percival, St. Catharines, Ont.
- Deborah Pethrick, Winnipeg, Man.
- Jeffery Dwayne Pinch, Vaughan, N.S.
- Francine Alida Quinn, North Bay, Ont.
- Anthony Michael Saikali, Halifax, N.S.
- Paul Samuel Semkowich, Aurora, Ont.
- Beth Alberta Smith, Sudbury, Ont.
- Michael Steven Smook, Regina, Sask.
- Paul Joel Snobelen, Brampton, Ont.
- Master Corporal Andrew Stevens, Winnipeg, Man.
- Paige Alyssa Gwynne Van Der Zweep, Winnipeg, Man.
- Philip Ernest Williams, Binbrook, Ont.
- Daniel Alvin Joseph Wilson, C.D., Magnetawan, Ont.

== Provincial Honours ==
=== National Order of Québec ===
==== Officers of the National Order of Québec ====
Undress ribbon for an Officer of the National Order of Québec

- Jean-Pierre Charbonneau, O.Q.
- Paul-André Fortier, O.Q.
- André Gagnon, O.Q.
- Michel Goulet, O.Q.
- Phoebe Greenberg, O.Q.
- Francine Lelièvre, O.Q.
- Louise Mailhot, O.Q.
- Andrée-Lise Méthot, O.Q.
- Pierre Nepveu, O.Q.
- Louis Paquet, O.Q.
- Isabelle Peretz, O.Q.
- Guy Rocher, O.Q.
- Louis Sabourin, O.Q.
- Serge Viau, O.Q.

==== Knights of the National Order of Québec ====
Undress ribbon for a Knight of the National Order of Québec

- John Bergeron, C.Q.
- Michèle Boisvert, C.Q.
- John Bergeron, C.Q.
- Michèle Boisvert, C.Q.
- Michèle Boulanger-Bussière, C.Q.
- Chrystine Brouillet, C.Q.
- Xavier Dolan, C.Q.
- Daniel Gélinas, C.Q.
- André Gosselin, C.Q.
- Benoît Huot, C.Q.
- Marcel Kretz, C.Q.
- Paul-André Linteau, C.Q.
- Patrick Paultre, C.Q.
- Lili-Anna Pereša, C.Q.
- Danielle Perreault, C.Q.
- Fred Saad, C.Q.
- Wilson Sanon, C.Q.
- Danielle Sauvage, C.Q.
- Nicolas Steinmetz, C.Q.
- Peter F. Trent, C.Q.
- Lorraine Vaillancourt, C.Q.
- Jean-Pierre Villeneuve, C.Q.

===== Honorary Knight =====
Takeya Kaburaki, C.Q.

=== Saskatchewan Order of Merit ===
Undress ribbon for a member of the Saskatchewan Order of Merit

- National Chief Perry Bellegarde, S.O.M.
- Gail Bowen, S.O.M.
- Dr. Robert Calder, S.O.M.
- Maurice Delage, S.O.M.
- Thelma Pepper, S.O.M.
- Neil Richards, S.O.M. (1949-2018) (posthumous)

=== Order of Ontario ===
Undress ribbon for a member of the Order of Ontario

- No appointments in 2018

=== Order of British Columbia ===
Undress ribbon for a member of the Order of British Columbia

- George C. Melville
- The Honourable Lance S.G. Finch
- The Honourable David Anderson
- Tracey Herbert
- Carey Newman (Ha-yalth-kingeme)
- Brian Fehr; Domenic Cuccione
- Grand Chief Percy Joe
- Brenda Martens
- Deborah Abbey
- Mary Kitagawa
- Anne Giardini
- Joseph James Arvay
- Andrew Way Yin Joe
- William Millerd
- Brian Minter

=== Alberta Order of Excellence ===
Undress ribbon for a member of the Alberta Order of Excellence

- Reg Basken
- Rosella Bjornson
- Wayne Chiu
- k.d. lang
- David Manz
- Sol Rolinger
- Allan Wachowich
- Ralph Young

=== Order of Prince Edward Island ===
Undress ribbon for a member of the Order of Prince Edward Island

- Mark Arendz
- Heather Cutcliffe
- Irene Jewell of York

=== Order of Manitoba ===
Undress ribbon for a member of the Order of Manitoba

- David T. Barnard
- Michael Patrick Barry Belhumeur
- Jacqueline Blay
- Barbara Bruce
- Sara J. Israels
- Robert T. Kristjanson
- W. H. (Bill) Loewen
- Bernice Marmel
- Robb Nash
- Ken Opaleke
- Grant N. Pierce
- Cheryl Rockman-Greenberg

=== Order of New Brunswick ===
Undress ribbon for a member of the Order of New Brunswick

- Judy Astle
- Charles Bernard
- Roberta Dugas
- Louise Imbeault
- Gaetan Lanteigne
- Walter John Learning
- James Lockyer, C.D.
- Rebecca "Becca" Schofield, M.S.M.
- Ed and Eke van Oorschot
- Eileen Wallace

=== Order of Nova Scotia ===
Undress ribbon for a member of the Order of Nova Scotia

- Ellie Black, O.N.S.
- John L. Bragg, O.C., O.N.S.
- Dr. Clotilda Douglas-Yakimchuk, C.M., O.N.S., D. Litt.
- Janet F. Kitz (Deceased), O.N.S., M.S.M.
- Patti Ann Melanson (Deceased), O.N.S.
- Wade Holly Smith, O.N.S. (Posthumous)

=== Order of Newfoundland and Labrador ===
Undress ribbon for a member of the Order of Newfoundland and Labrador

- Cassandra E. Ivany
- Joseph Butler
- Richard Cashin
- Dr. Lloydetta Quaicoe
- Rev. Arthur G. Elliott
- Kaetlyn Osmond
- John Christopher Pratt
- Odelle Pike
- Darryl Fry
- Paula Dawe

== Territorial Honours ==
=== Order of Nunavut ===
Undress ribbon for a member of the Order of Nunavut

- Zacharias Kunuk

=== Order of the Northwest Territories ===
Undress ribbon for a member of the Order of Northwest Territories

- Les Carpenter
- Sharon Firth
- Lillian Elias

== Canadian Bravery Decorations ==
=== Star of Courage ===
Undress ribbon for the Star of Courage

- Constable Sheldon Rayad Shah
- Constable Philip Sheldon

=== Medal of Bravery ===
Undress ribbon for the Medal of Bravery

- Ali Belhis, M.B.
- Matthew Attwell, M.B.
- Stephen Baliski, M.B.
- Dennis Becker, M.B. (posthumous)
- Juan Bergoa, M.B.
- Constable Thomas Broadfoot, M.B.
- Brian Chapman, M.B.
- Janson Chapman, M.B.
- Kevin Chau, M.B.
- Anthony Colabufalo, M.B.
- Jonathan Davidson, M.B.
- Jessica Dicks, M.B.
- Warrant Officer John Dunbar, M.B.
- Brian Duncan, M.B.
- Paul Ehni, M.B.
- Constable Michael Gallagher, M.B.
- James Edward Giles, M.B.
- Christopher Hay, M.B.
- Fire Captain James Bruce Hicks, M.B.
- Angela Irvine, M.B.
- Riza Kasikcogliu, M.B.
- Corporal Alexander Keightley, M.B.
- Constable Daniel King, M.B.
- Sergeant Paul Klassen, M.B.
- Derrick Kozinski, M.B.
- Master Corporal Dale Kurdziel, M.B.
- Christopher Lang, M.B.
- Nelson Langridge, M.B.
- Cole Marshall, M.B.
- Larry Martin, M.B.
- Constable Corey McAllister, M.B.
- John McQuaid, M.B.
- Marcus Middleton, M.B.
- Javier Francisco Morales, M.B.
- Troy Morton, M.B.
- David Nelson, M.B.
- Travis Robbins, M.B.
- Jeffrey Stewart, M.B.
- Master Corporal Shawn Thorn, M.B.
- Francis Underwood, M.B.
- Paul van Doesburg, M.B.
- Shane Watson, M.B.
- Corporal Michel Westelaken, M.B.
- Clark Whitecalf, M.B.
- Derek Grahame Wilson, M.B.
- Travis Wolfe, M.B.
- Glenn Wozniak, M.B.
- Constable Dru Abernethy
- Marco Berardinucci
- John Boorsma
- Volunteer Fire Chief Shawn Porter Carey
- Guy Carrier
- Kaden Clouston
- Owen William Collins
- Constable Dale Culley
- Constable Mathieu Daigle
- Stayton Danylowich
- Wynden Danylowich
- Constable Shaun De Granpré, M.B. (This is a second award of the Medal of Bravery)
- Daniel Desrochers
- Alexandr Diaz-Papkovich
- Brian Dittmar
- Constable Eric Dubois
- Jason Eberley
- Nourredine Fard
- Constable Sidney Gaudette
- Sergeant Gregory John Gerbrandt
- Constable Fabrice Gevaudan (posthumous)
- Constable Ryan Gillis
- Andrew King
- Constable Guillaume Lapointe
- Constable Douglas Larche (posthumous)
- Rémi Lesage
- Corporal Peter Cyril MacLean
- Fire Chief A. Brent Marshall
- Constable Bryan Martell
- Terry May
- Ronald Alan Minter
- Constable Shelly L. Mitchell
- Bruce Morrison
- Kenneth Nanooch
- Samuel Nanooch
- Constable Robert Nickerson
- Harry Olivieri
- Barry Parks (deceased)
- Steve Prior
- David Provonost
- Mark Robinson
- Constable Dave Ross (posthumous)
- Michael Rouzes
- Constable Elmer Russell
- Constable Leah Russell
- Shawn Solomon
- Charles Soop
- Constable Evan Taylor
- Mackenzie Vatter-Martineau
- Michael Wassill (posthumous)
- Constable Erik White
- Taylor White
- Kevin Wiseman
- Corporal Justin Yaassoub

== Meritorious Service Decorations ==
=== Meritorious Service Cross (Military Division) ===
Undress ribbon for Meritious Service Cross in the military division

- Lieutenant-General Frederick Benjamin Hodges, III, M.S.C. (United States Army)
- Master Corporal John Archer, M.S.C., C.D.
- General Joseph Francis Dunford, Jr., M.S.C. (United States Marine Corps)
- General Lori Jean Robinson, M.S.C. (United States Air Force)
- Commander Todd Bonnar, M.S.C., C.D.

=== Meritorious Service Cross (Civil Division) ===
Undress ribbon for Meritious Service Cross in the civilian division

- Allan Ian Aitken, M.S.C.
- Murad Al-Katib, M.S.C.
- Dominic Audet, M.S.C.
- Charlene Frances Belleau, M.S.C.
- Sakchin Bessette, M.S.C.
- Jeremy Bryant, M.S.C.
- Andrée Cazabon, M.S.C.
- Sergeant Alain J. M. Clavet, M.S.C. (retired)
- Daniel Corvec, M.S.C.
- Naheed Dosani, M.S.C.
- André Dudemaine, M.S.C.
- Janice Lucille Eisenhauer, A.O.E., M.S.C.
- Éric Fournier, M.S.C.
- André Gingras, M.S.C.
- Bala Theresa (Angèle) Singareddy Gingras, M.S.C.
- Andrew Hall, M.S.C.
- Alex Harvey, M.S.C.
- Garry Wayne Janz, M.S.C.
- Sandra Laronde, M.S.C.
- Shaun Loney, M.S.C.
- Dawn Madahbee Leach, M.S.C.
- Josephine Mandamin, M.S.C.
- Sean McCormick, M.S.C.
- Ryan W. Bresser Moran, M.S.C.
- Robert Piché, M.S.C.
- Susan Jane Pond, M.S.C.
- Carolyn J. Reicher, M.S.C.
- Kenneth D. Richard, M.S.C.
- Jason Rodi, M.S.C.
- Pierre Thibeault, M.S.C.

=== Third Award of the Meritorious Service Medal (Military Division) ===
- Colonel Orest Myroslaw Babij, M.S.M., C.D.

=== Second Award of the Meritorious Service Medal (Military Division) ===
Undress ribbon for the Meritious Service Medal in the military division

- Brigadier-General Shane Brennan, M.S.M., C.D.
- Captain(N) Jeffrey Hamilton, M.S.M., C.D.
- Rear-Admiral Darren Carl Hawco, M.S.M., C.D.

=== Meritorious Service Medal (Military Division) ===
- Colonel Orest Myroslaw Babij, M.S.M., C.D.
- Colonel Angela M. Banville, M.S.M., C.D.
- Master Warrant Officer Andrew Paul Carriere, M.S.M., C.D.
- Brigadier-General Ross Ermel, M.S.M., C.D.
- Warrant Officer Pierre-Marc Girard, M.S.M., C.D.
- Commander Andrew Colin Hingston, M.S.M., C.D.
- Lieutenant-Commander Wilfred Douglas Gordon Lund, M.S.M., C.D.
- Brigadier-General Mark Allen Matheson, M.S.M., C.D. (Retired)
- Commander Jeffrey Lawrence Murray, M.S.C., M.S.M., C.D.
- Lieutenant-Colonel Todd Scharlach, M.S.M., C.D.
- Major Anthony Berardinelli, M.S.M., C.D.
- Sergeant James Dalebozik, M.S.M., C.D.
- Chief Warrant Officer David Edward Hepditch, M.M.M., M.S.M., C.D.
- Lieutenant-Colonel Christopher Lionel Robidoux, M.S.M., C.D.
- Lieutenant-Commander Paul Smith, M.S.M., C.D.
- Major Christopher Wood, M.S.M., C.D.
- Warrant Officer Sean Eldon Benedict, M.S.M., C.D.
- Leading Seaman Steven Galloway, M.S.M., C.D.
- Major Tammy Michelle Hiscock, M.S.M., C.D.
- Lieutenant-Colonel Nickolas Roby, M.S.M., C.D.
- Chief Warrant Officer Keith Michael Olstad, M.M.M., M.S.M., C.D.
- Major Carlo Rossi, M.S.M.
- Brigadier-General Brad Sullivan, M.S.M. (United States Air Force)
- Major Michael Veitch, M.S.M., C.D.

=== Meritorious Service Medal (Civil Division) ===
Undress ribbon for Meritious Service Medal in the civilian division

- Zenon Petro Andrusyszyn, M.S.M.
- Geneviève Auclair, M.S.M.
- Katelyn Bateman, M.S.M.
- Julie Bélanger Vincent, M.S.M.
- Michelle Marie-Paule Bonneau, M.S.M.
- Mitch Bourbonniere, M.S.M.
- Stella Marguerite Bowles, M.S.M.
- Laurent Brisebois, M.S.M.
- Emilie Bureau, M.S.M.
- Theresa R. Collizza Carriere, M.S.M.
- Michael Redhead Champagne, M.S.M.
- Alan Ojiig Theodore Corbiere, M.S.M.
- Gordon Cressy, O.Ont., M.S.M.
- Augustin Dalton, M.S.M.
- Neil Debassige, M.S.M.
- Jean Duchesneau, M.S.M.
- Paul S. Etherington, M.S.M.
- Mark Etherington, M.S.M.
- Sean Etherington, M.S.M.
- Didier Farré, M.S.M.
- James Favel, M.S.M.
- Kirby D. Fontaine, M.S.M.
- Marie Ann Fontaine, M.S.M.
- Merna Margaret Forster, M.S.M.
- Daniel Gaudet, M.S.M.
- Sydney Adam Goldenberg, M.S.M.
- Althea Guiboche, M.S.M.
- Margaret Louise Hewlett, M.S.M.
- Kyle Hill, M.S.M.
- Waneek Horn-Miller, M.S.M.
- Larry Hundt, M.S.M.
- Lorna Hundt, M.S.M.
- Karen Joseph, M.S.M.
- Marguerite Kazarian, M.S.M.
- Sébastien Lapierre, M.S.M.
- Fred Losani, M.S.M.
- Nathalie Maione, M.S.M.
- Assistant Commissioner Russell B. Mirasty, M.S.M. (retired)
- Larry James Morrissette, M.S.M. (posthumous)
- Robb Nash, M.S.M.
- Andrea Nemtin, M.S.M.
- Donald Wayne Nicholls, M.S.M.
- Paul Charles Nichols, M.S.M.
- Terry Lee Nichols, M.S.M.
- Jane E. Nokes, M.S.M.
- Allan Mi'kskimmiisoka'simii Pard, M.S.M. (posthumous)
- Mark W. Podlasly, M.S.M.
- Farhat Rehman, M.S.M.
- Diane Louise Roussin, M.S.M.
- Wilson Sanon, M.S.M.
- Becca Schofield, M.S.M.
- Harnarayan Singh, M.S.M.
- Fabien Sinnett, M.S.M.
- John Gordon Stewart, M.S.M.
- Michelle Sullivan, M.S.M.
- Nathan T. Tidridge, M.S.M.
- Bernard Trottier, M.S.M.
- Jennifer Nicole van Wyck, M.S.M.
- Erik Nelson Vu, M.S.M.
- Joseph Y. K. Wong, C.M., M.S.M.
- Leonard Gordon Zebedee, M.S.M.
- Helen Zukerman, M.S.M.

=== Secret appointments ===
16 June 2018: Her Excellency the Right Honourable Julie Payette, Governor General and Commander-in-Chief of Canada, on the recommendation of the Chief of the Defence Staff, has awarded seven Meritorious Service Medals to members of the Canadian Armed Forces for military activities of high standard that have brought great honour to the Canadian Armed Forces and to Canada. For security and operational reasons, the names and citations of the recipients have not been released.

== Polar Medal ==
Undress ribbon of the Polar Medal

- Christopher Robert Burn
- Norman E. Hallendy
- Jerry Kobalenko
- Carolyn Carroll
- Fay Trombley

== Commonwealth and Foreign Orders, Decorations and Medal awarded to Canadians ==
=== From Her Majesty The Queen in Right of Australia ===
==== Australian Service Medal with Counter Terrorism and Special Recovery Operations Clasp ====
Undress ribbon for the Australian Service Medal

- Warrant Officer Martin Buisson

==== Australian Operational Service Medal – Greater Middle East Operation ====
- Sergeant Ryan Edward Harding

=== From Her Majesty The Queen in Right of the United Kingdom ===
==== Member of the Order of the Companions of Honour ====
Undress ribbon for a member of the Order of the Companions of Honour Ribbon

- Ms. Margaret Olwen MacMillan

==== Commander of the Most Excellent Order of the British Empire ====
Undress ribbon for all grades of çOrder of the British Empire

- Mrs. Brenda Dianne Hebb Trenowden

==== Officer of the Most Excellent Order of the British Empire ====
- Mr. Marshall Charles Bailey

==== Member of the Most Excellent Order of the British Empire ====
- Ms. Melinda Mills

==== Royal Navy Long Service and Good Conduct Medal ====
Undress ribbon for the Royal Navy Long Service and Good Conduct Medal

- Lieutenant(N) Adam Rees

=== From the President of the Republic of Austria ===
==== Grand Decoration of Honour for Services to the Republic of Austria ====
- Mr. Renaud Sorieul

=== From His Majesty The King of the Belgians ===
==== Knight of the Order of Leopold ====
Undress ribbon for a Knight of the Order of Leopold of the Kingdom of Belgium

- Mr. Stephen Klimczuk-Massion

=== From the President of the Federative Republic of Brazil ===
==== Grand Officer of the Order of Military Merit ====
- Lieutenant-General Paul Francis Wynnyk, CMM MSM CD

Undress ribbon for a Grand Officer of the Order of Military Merit of Brazil

==== Knight of the Order of Military Merit ====
- Chief Warrant Officer Alain Guimond

==== Santos-Dumont Merit Medal ====
Undress ribbon for the Santos-Dumont Merit Medal

- Major Eric Michael Willrich

=== From the President of Burkina Faso ===
==== Knight of the Order of Merit ====
- Ms. Lucie Coulibaly-Tapsoba
- Mr. Gérard Coulombe
- Ms. Edith Gingras
- Mr. Luc Keita
- Mr. Sawadogo Mahamadou
- Mr. Jean-Paul Ruszkowski
- Mr. Kariyon Robert Somé
- Mr. Souleymane Traoré

=== From the Government of the Republic of Colombia ===
==== Grand Cross of the "José María Córdova" Order of Military Merit ====
Undress ribbon for a Grand Cross of the "José María Córdova" Order of Military Merit

- Lieutenant-General Paul Francis Wynnyk CMM MSM CD

=== From the President of the French Republic ===
==== Commander of the National Order of the Legion of Honour ====
Undress ribbon for a Commander of the National Order of the Legion of Honour

- Ms. Helen Vari

==== Knight of the National Order of the Legion of Honour ====
- Mr. Mark Hutchings
- Mr. David Kettle
- Mr. André Levesque
- Mr. Daniel Pauly
- Mr. Clément Duhaime

==== Grand Officer of the National Order of Merit ====
Undress ribbon for a Grand Officer of the National Order of Merit

- Ms. Antonine Maillet

==== Knight of the National Order of Merit ====
- Mr. Yves Tiberghien
- Ms. Céline Bak
- Brigadier-General Steven Whelan

==== Officer of the Order of Arts and Letters ====
Undress ribbon for an officer of the French Order of Arts and Letters

- Mr. Piers Handling

==== Knight of the Order of Arts and Letters ====
- Mr. Didier Farré
- Ms. Manon Barbeau
- Mr. Daniel Bertolino

==== Officer of the Order of the Academic Palms ====
Undress ribbon for an Officer of the Order of the Academic Palm of the French Republic

- Mr. Gérald Bennetot-Deveria
- Mr. Charles Romero

==== Knight of the Order of the Academic Palms ====
Undress ribbon for a Knight of the Order of the Academic Palms

- Mr. Richard Boudreault
- Mr. Richard Clément
- Ms. Edith Dumont
- Ms. Esther Gaudreault
- Mr. Ron Levi
- Ms. Claire Trépanier
- Ms. Catherine Audrain
- Mr. Frédéric Bastien
- Ms. Josette Bouchard-Muller
- Mr. Paul Cohen
- Mr. Jean-Douglas Comeau
- Ms. Patricia Guérin
- Ms. Mirna Hafez
- Mr. Marc Lapprand
- Mr. Jean-Jacques Nattiez
- Mr. Stéphane Nouaillac
- Ms. Valérie Restrepo
- Mr. Sylvain Rousseau-Egele
- Mr. Gilles Savard
- Ms. Annette Viel

==== Knight of the Order of Agricultural Merit ====
- Mr. Frédéric Tandy
- Mr. Claude Zarié

==== National Defence Medal, Gold Echelon ====
Undress ribbon for the National Defence Medal, Gold Echelon

- Brigadier-General Stephen Richardson Kelsey
- Colonel Cayle Ian Oberwarth

==== National Defence Medal, Silver Echelon ====
- Major Timothy William Francis Day

==== National Defence Medal, Bronze Echelon ====
- Sub-Lieutenant Antoine Blais

==== Foreign Affairs Medal of Honour, Bronze Echelon ====
Undress ribbon for the Honour medal of Foreign Affairs

- Mr. Denis Laroche
- Ms. Béatrice Allaire
- Mr. Yann Beaumelle
- Ms. Mirna Corona
- Ms. Sylvie Lemaire

=== From the President of the Federal Republic of Germany ===
==== Cross of the Order of Merit of the Federal Republic of Germany ====
Undress ribbon for the Cross of the Order of Merit of the Federal Republic of Germany

- Dr. Ian Simon Fraser
- Dr. Annemarie Hofer
- Mr. David Malcolm Darby
- Dr. Alexander Fried

=== From His Holiness The Pope of the Holy See ===
==== Dame and Knight Commanders of the Order of Pope Saint Sylvester ====
Undress ribbon of all grades of the Order of Pope Saint Sylvester

- Mr. Austin A. Mardon
- Ms. Catherine Mardon

=== From the President of the Republic of Hungary ===
==== Commander's Cross of the Order of Merit of Hungary (Civil Division) ====
Undress ribbon for a Commander's Cross of the Order of Merit of Hungary (Civil Division)

- Mr. Peter Forbath

==== Officer's Cross of the Order of Merit of Hungary (Civil Division) ====
- Mr. Frank Hasenfratz
- Mr. Istvan Mody

==== Knight's Cross of the Order of Merit of Hungary (Civil Division) ====
Undress ribbon for a Knight's Cross of the Order of Merit of Hungary (Civil Division)

- Mr. Miklos Gratzer
- Mr. Gabor Szilasi
- Ms. Andrea Blanar
- Mr. Peter Csermely
- Mr. Leslie Dan Louis
- Mr. Kalman Dreisziger
- Mr. Balazs Jaschko
- Mr. Marton Seregelyes
- Mr. Zoltan Vass

==== Golden Cross of Merit of Hungary (Civil Division) ====
Undress ribbon for the Golden Cross of Merit of Hungary (Civil Division)

- Dr. Laszlo Aladar Jeney

=== From the President of the Republic of Italy ===
==== Knight of the Order of Merit of the Republic of Italy ====
Knight of the Order of Merit of the Republic of Italy

- Mr. Giuseppe Asaro
- Mr. Antonino Cuffaro
- Ms. Marie-Josée Kravis

==== Knight of the Order of the Star of Italy ====
- Mr. Jean Charles Viens
- Mr. Nicola Antonio Di Donato

=== From His Majesty The Emperor of Japan ===
==== Order of the Rising Sun, Gold and Silver Star ====
Undress ribbon for the Order of the Rising Sun, Gold and Silver Star

- Mr. Mike Wallace
- Mr. Rocky Rokuji Oishi

==== Order of the Rising Sun, Gold Rays with Rosette ====
- Mr. Christian D'Orangeville
- Mr. Theodore William Goossen

==== Order of the Sacred Treasure, Gold and Silver Rays ====
Undress ribbon for the Order of the Sacred Treasure, Gold and Silver Rays

- Ms. Elizabeth van der Wind

=== From the President of Latvia ===
==== Order of Viesturs, First Class ====
Undress ribbon for the Order of Viesturs, for military awards

- General Jonathan Holbert Vance, C.M.M., M.S.C., C.D.

==== Order of Viesturs, Fourth Class ====
- Lieutenant-Colonel Wade Rutland

==== Cross of Recognition, Fifth Class ====
- Mr. Valdis Martins Vagners

=== From the President of the Republic of Lithuania ===
==== Knight's Cross of the Order for Merits to Lithuania ====
Undress ribbon for a Knight's Cross of the Order for Merits to Lithuania

- Mr. Vladas Petrauskas

=== From the President of Mongolia ===
==== Friendship Medal ====
- The Honourable Joseph A. Day

=== From His Majesty The King of the Netherlands ===
==== King Willem-Alexander Investiture Medal 2013 ====
Undress ribbon for the King Willem-Alexander Investiture Medal 2013

- The Right Honourable David Lloyd Johnston, PC CC CMM COM CD

=== From the Secretary-General of the North Atlantic Treaty Organization ===
==== Meritorious Service Medal ====
Undress ribbon for NATO's Meritorious Service Medal

- Lieutenant-Colonel Michael Brian Patrick
- Commander Sheldon Roderick Kyle Gillis
- Lieutenant-Colonel Donald Mulders
- Colonel Jacques Mario Scott O'Keefe

=== From His Majesty The King of Norway ===
==== Officer of the Royal Norwegian Order of Merit ====
Undress ribbon for an Officer of the Royal Norwegian Order of Merit

- Mr. Edward Wagner

==== Norwegian War Medal ====
- Mr. Percy Cyril Frost Danby

=== From the President of Pakistan ===
==== Star of Sacrifice ====
- Lieutenant-Colonel Mike Voith

=== From the President of the Republic of Poland ===
==== Commander's Cross with Star of the Order of Merit of the Republic of Poland ====
Undress ribbon for a Commander's Cross with Star of the Order of Merit of the Republic of Poland

- Ms. Irena Cousins
- Mr. Jan Cytowski

==== Officer's Cross of the Order of Merit of the Republic of Poland ====
- Mr. Gunnar Svante Paulsson

==== Commander's Cross of the Order of Polonia Restituta ====
Undress ribbon for a Commander's Cross of the Order of Polonia Restituta

- Mr. Ireneusz Sieranski (posthumous)

==== Knight's Cross of the Order of Polonia Restituta ====
- Mr. Jozef Palimaka

==== Cross of the Order of the Cross of Independence ====
- Ms. Barbara Maria Kryn (posthumous)

==== Cross of Freedom and Solidarity ====
Cross of Freedom and Solidaritya

- Mr. Ireneusz Sieranski
- Ms. Renata Sierańska
- Mr. Jan Stelmach
- Mr. Herbert Franciszek Rennert
- Mr. Slawomir Sadurski

==== Siberian Exiles Cross ====
- Ms. Zofia Kowalska

==== Long Marital Life Medal ====
Undress ribbon of the Medal for Long Marital Life

- Mrs. Stanislawa Janusz
- Mr. Zbigniew Janusz

=== From the President of Portugal ===
==== Commander of the Order of Merit of Portugal ====
- Mr. David Nicodemio Tavares

=== From His Majesty The King of Spain ===
==== Commander of the Order of Civil Merit ====
Undress ribbon of a Commander of the Order of Civil Merit of the Kingdom of Spain

- Dr. Andres M. Lozano

=== From the President of the United States of America ===
==== Officer of the Legion of Merit ====
Undress ribbon of an Officer of the Legion of Merit of the United States

- Colonel Patrick J. B. Carpentier
- Colonel Daniel S. Constable
- Brigadier-General Dany SSJ Fortin
- Captain (N) Steve Jorgensen

==== Defence Meritorious Service Medal ====
Undress ribbon of the Defence Meritorious Service Medal of the United States

- Lieutenant-Commander Michael A. Seed
- Lieutenant-Colonel Daniel Theriault
- Major John R. F. Waugh
- Lieutenant-Colonel Justin P. Boileau
- Major Dave J. S. Kruger
- Major Francesco Messina
- Major James R. Siebring
- Major Jennifer C. Stadnyk
- Major Timothy R. Symington
- Master Warrant Officer Jason J. Yeremiy
- Major Joel D. Levandier

==== Meritorious Service Medal ====
Undress ribbon of the Meritorious Service Medal of the United States

- Lieutenant-Colonel Frank K. Ebner
- Lieutenant-Colonel Christopher L. Robidoux
- Sergeant James R. Sceviour
- Major Louis-Philippe Tardif
- Lieutenant-Colonel Kevin J. Brown
- Captain Robert T. Curtis
- Major Philippe-André Genest
- Lieutenant-Colonel Todd W. Harris
- Major Theodore H. Moreau
- Major Michael J. Schultz
- Major Mark G. Wilson
- Major Michael E. Wood
- Superintendent Harvey L. Seddon
- Lieutenant-Colonel David Alan Coker
- Major Mario Joseph Jaques Gregoire
- Colonel Joshua James Major
- Major Cameron W. Meikle
- Captain Rishi Sehgal

==== Air Medal ====
Undress ribbon of the United States Air Medal

- Warrant Officer Kendell W. Hayward
- Captain Alexandre Ouellet
- Sergeant Daniel J. Publicover
- Warrant Officer Jamie S. Rideout

== Erratums of Commonwealth and Foreign Orders, Decorations and Medal awarded to Canadians ==
=== 03 March 2018 ===
==== From the President of Finland ====
===== Knight of the Order of the Lion of Finland, 1st Class =====
- Mr. Stephen Timmons

=== 31 March 2018 ===
==== From the President of the Republic of Italy ====
===== Knight of the Order of Merit of the Republic of Italy =====
- Mr. Giuseppe Asaro
- Mr. Antonino Cuffaro

=== 27 October 2018 ===
==== From the President of the United States of America ====
===== Meritorious Service Medal =====
- Major Ralf H. Urzinger
