= Commissionaires Long Service Medal =

Canadian service medal

- Ribbon bar of the Commissionaires Long Service Medal
- Type: Long Service Medal
- Awarded for: 12 years of service
- Presented by: The monarch of Canada
- Eligibility: Canadian Corps of Commissionaires
- Clasps: 5 additional years of service (maximum of 3 clasps)
- Status: Currently awarded
- Established: 20 August 1948

Precedence
- Next (higher): Service Medal of the Order of St John
- Next (lower): Newfoundland and Labrador Bravery Award

The Commissionaires Long Service Medal is a Canadian service medal for members of the Canadian Corps of Commissionaires. The medal honours 12 years of exemplary service by members of the Canadian Corps of Commissionaires. The medal is accompanied by a miniature CLSM and undress ribbon in a presentation box. There is no Post Nominal entitlement accompanying receipt of the medal.

For each additional five (5) years of service, a commissionaire may be awarded a 'silver' bar with a maple leaf in the centre (clasp), to be worn on the medal ribbon halfway between the medal bar and the top of the ribbon. A maximum of three such bars may be awarded and worn. A 'silver' rosette is provided with each five-year bar, and this is to be affixed to the CLSM undress ribbon if such a ribbon is worn.

For those long serving commissionaires who qualify for a further service bar having reached 32 years of service, a 'gold' bar (clasp) is awarded to replace the three 'silver' bars. A 'gold' rosette is also provided to replace the 'silver' rosettes.

This medal was first approved by the Secretary of State on 20 August 1948 although a slightly different form. An Order in Council of 26 February 1998 officially incorporated it into the Canadian Honours system.
