= John Fraser Secondary School =

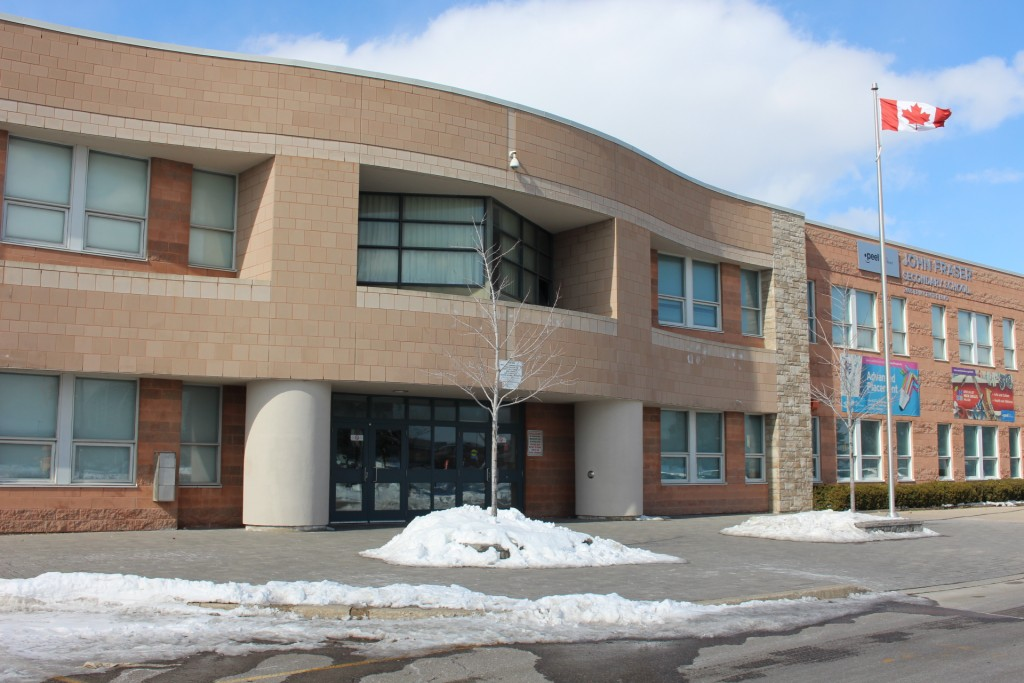
- John Fraser Secondary School Main Entrance

Location
- 2665 Erin Centre Boulevard; Mississauga, Ontario, L5M 5H6; Canada; 43.5598°N 79.7164°W

Information
- School type: Public, High school
- Founded: 1990
- School board: Peel District School Board
- Superintendent: Claudine Scuccato
- Area trustee: Brad MacDonald; Nokha Dakroub; Robert Crocker
- Principal: Brent Austin
- Grades: 9-12
- Enrolment: 1760 (2026)
- Language: English
- Colours: Blue, silver and white
- Mascot: Royal Jaguar
- Team name: John Fraser Jaguars (formerly John Fraser Royals)
- Website: johnfraser.peelschools.org

John Fraser Secondary School, colloquially referred to as Fraser, is a public high school (serving grades 9-12) located on Erin Centre Boulevard, Mississauga, Ontario, Canada. John Fraser features 2 gymnasiums, a fully equipped fitness center, an auto shop, as well as 12 portables due to increased enrolment over the years. A newly renovated rubberized track was also constructed on the north-western side opposite the main building in 2019.

Apart from regular day school, John Fraser offers co-op, Advanced Placement (AP), summer school, and night school programs. The school facilities are also regularly used by private sports and tutoring organizations during off-school hours. As of 2018, it is ranked 14th among high schools in Ontario by the Fraser Institute.

== History ==
The school was named after John Fraser who retired as Director of the Peel District School Board in 1988. The school was established in 1990. In 2002, the school began an expansion which resulted in a new wing being added to the school to meet the rising population.

== Community involvement ==
John Fraser has community partnerships with General Motors, Unifirst, Unisource, Agfa, and Computers for Schools.

The school hosts an annual Charity Week. They have raised funds for Kids Can Free the Children to build two schools in Sierra Leone and Sleeping Children Around the World to provide bed kits for 302 children around Canada. In addition, the school donated $15,150 for the Herbie Fund at the Hospital for Sick Children. Around 2010, John Fraser raised approximately $20,000 for women and girls in Afghanistan, and other profitable causes. In the 2016–2017 school year, John Fraser helped raise over $13,000 as well as approximately 1800 non-perishable food items for a local Mississauga food bank.

== Notable alumni ==
- Yi-Jia Susanne Hou, violinist
- Matt Johnson, actor and director
- Manny Malhotra, NHL player (Montreal Canadiens)
- Dalton Pompey, MLB player (Toronto Blue Jays)
- Kyle Porter, soccer player (Atlanta Silverbacks)
- Allan Rourke, professional hockey player
- A.J. Saudin, actor
- Shadia Simmons, actress
- Matt Zultek, professional hockey player, (CHL)
- Henry Shi, technology entrepreneur; co-founder of Super.com (formerly Snapcommerce)

== See also ==
- Education in Ontario
- List of secondary schools in Ontario
