= Telfer School of Management =

Business school at the University of Ottawa

Coordinates: 45.423802°N 75.68693°W

- École de gestion Telfer (French)
- Motto: Business for a Better Canada
- Type: Public business school
- Parent institution: University of Ottawa
- Dean: Stéphane Brutus
- Location: Ottawa, Ontario, Canada
- Campus: Urban

The Telfer School of Management (French: École de gestion Telfer) is a business school located at the University of Ottawa in Ottawa, Ontario, Canada. The school is named in honour of one university alumnus, Ian Telfer (MBA 1976), who made a significant donation to the University of Ottawa. The donation of $25 million to the school's business program was the largest donation in Canadian history to be given to a business school, until Steven Smith's donation of $50 Million to the Queen's University Smith School of Business.

== Degree programs ==
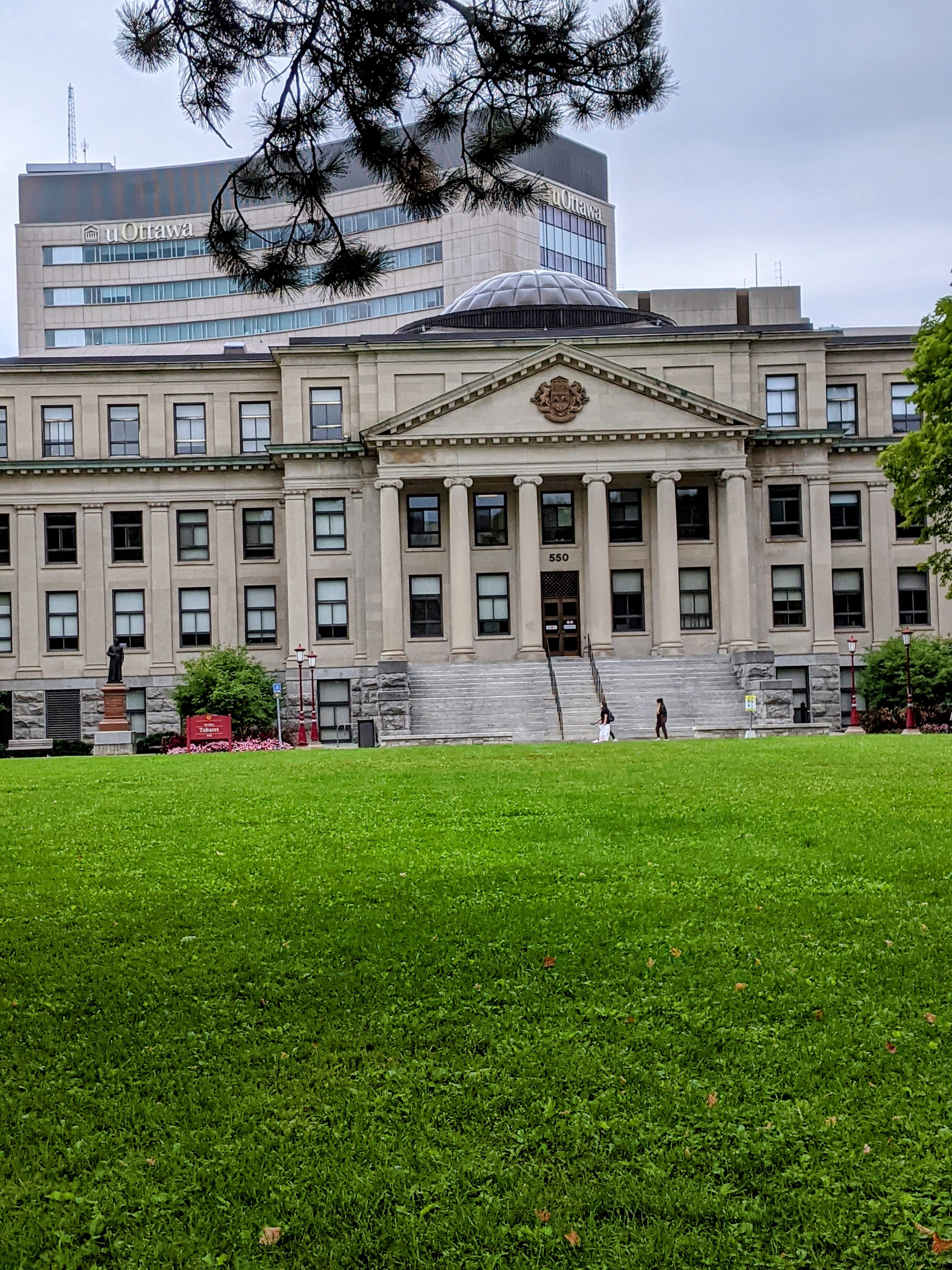

The school offers a number of undergraduate and graduate degree programs. The undergraduate programs include Accounting, MIS, e-Business, Entrepreneurship, Finance, Human Resource Management, International Business, Management and Marketing options that all earn a Baccalaureate of Commerce (BCom). The graduate programs include the Master's of Business Administration (MBA), Joint MBA-LLB Option, Executive Master's of Business Administration (EMBA), Master of Science in management, Master of Science in Health Systems and Master of Health Administration (MHA). The school also offers Inter-disciplinary graduate programs - Masters in Engineering Management, E-Business/ E-Commerce and Systems Science.

== Accreditations ==
The Telfer School of Management is one of only three schools in North America with triple accreditation. It is fully accredited by the AACSB (United States), the Association of MBAs (United Kingdom), and the EFMD (EQUIS) (Europe).

== Building ==
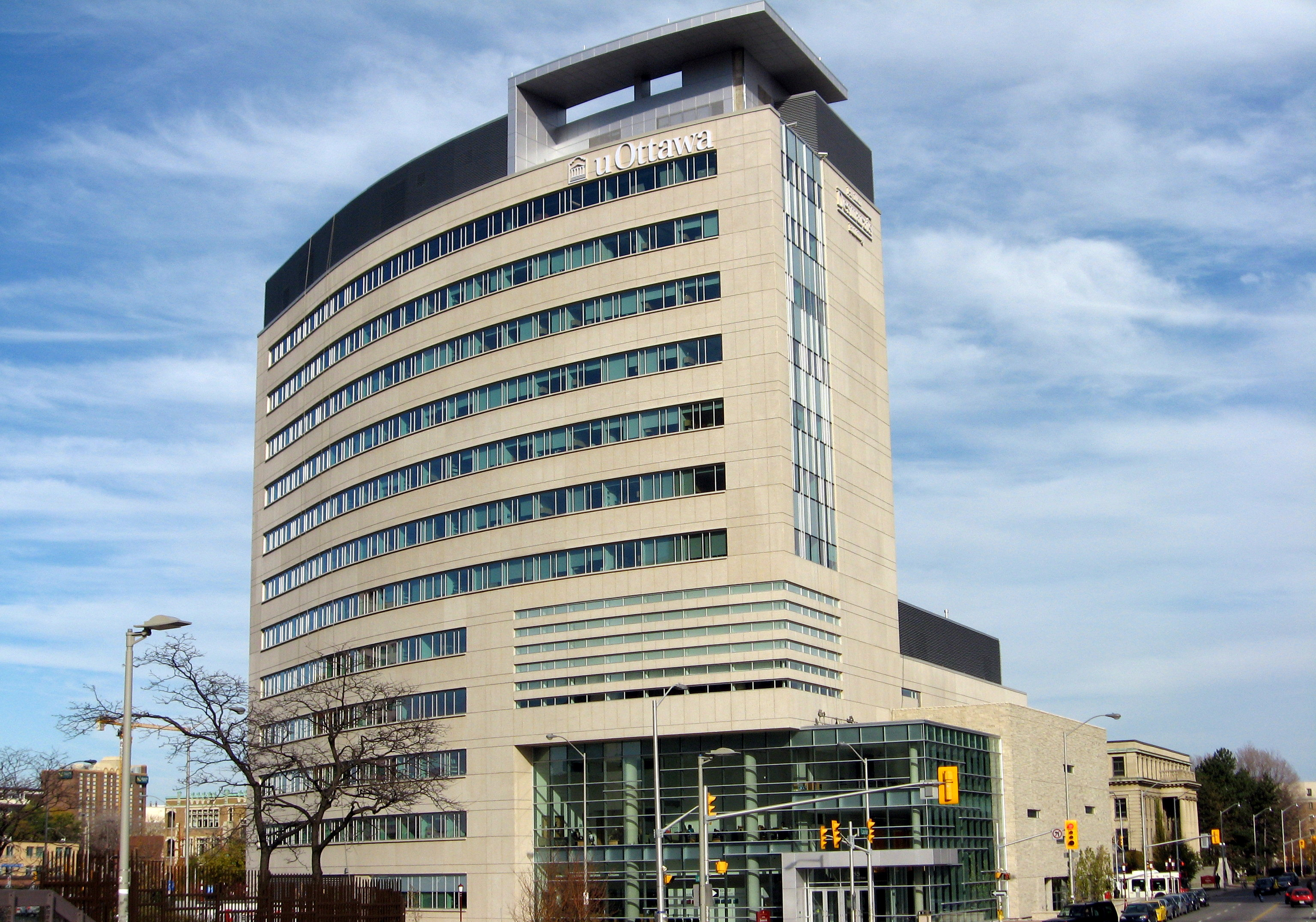
The Desmarais Building.

The school shares the newly constructed Desmarais Building (fr. Pavillon Desmarais), designed by Moriyama & Teshima Architects, with the Faculty of Arts. Construction of this new facility was made possible in part by a generous $15-million contribution from Mr. Paul Desmarais Sr., a graduate of the Telfer School of Management (BCom 1950). The Desmarais Building was completed in 2007.

== Research Centres ==
- Family Enterprise Legacy Institute
- Thriving Organizations Research Collective
- Centre for a Responsible Wealth Transition
- IBM Centre for Business Analytics and Performance
- Centre on Governance
- Mobile Emergency Triage (MET) Research Program

== Laboratories ==
- Knowledge Discovery and Data Mining Laboratory (KDD)
- Emerging Technological and Innovation Management Laboratory (ETIM)
- Market Place for Safe and Fair Trade (e-MP)
- MET Research: Computing Laboratory to Support Clinical decision Making at the Point of Care in the Emergency Department

== Research Networks ==
- Canadian Fisheries, Oceans, and Aquaculture Management (C-FOAM)
- Ocean Management Research Network (OMRN)

== Rankings ==
Business school rankings

Global
- QS MBA: 201+

In the 2006 ReportED Global Business School Ranking, the Telfer School of Management has been ranked 70th in the world and 6th among Canadian universities, for its MBA program.

The 2004 Financial Times global survey of EMBA programs ranked the U of O Executive MBA 65th out of 220 worldwide. In the 2007 rankings, the university placed 87th out of the top 90 EMBA programs.

The Telfer School of Management has also ranked among the Financial Times Top 150 business schools for the last four consecutive years (2004–2007).

The Corporate Knights magazine 2005 survey of business schools ranked the university's undergraduate program 4th in Canada. In the 2007 survey of business and law rankings, the undergraduate business program placed 10th. In the 2011 survey, the Telfer School of Management ranked 5th for its undergraduate business program (the Telfer BCom) and 8th for its MBA Program (the Telfer MBA). The rankings use additional components of social and environmental impact management infused into their curricula.

The Telfer School of Management is featured in the 2011 Edition of The Best 300 Business Schools Worldwide by Princeton Review, which produces test preparation, such as the SAT's and information regarding college admissions. The Telfer School of Management has been included in the Princeton Review's ranking of top business schools since 2005. According to the Ranking Web of Business School, the Telfer School of Management is currently ranked 123 in the world.

== Alumni ==
- Paul Desmarais Sr. (B.Com. 1950), chairman of the executive committee, Power Corporation of Canada
- Harley Finkelstein (MBA 2009), president, Shopify
- Ian Telfer (MBA 1976), former chairman of the board and director, Goldcorp Inc.
- Paul Vallée (B.Com. 1994), founder, chairman and chief executive officer, Pythian Group
- Sean Wise, managing director, Wise Mentor Capital
