= Charlotte Karam =

Canadian-born Lebanese scholar-activist

Charlotte M. Karam
- شرلوت م. كرم
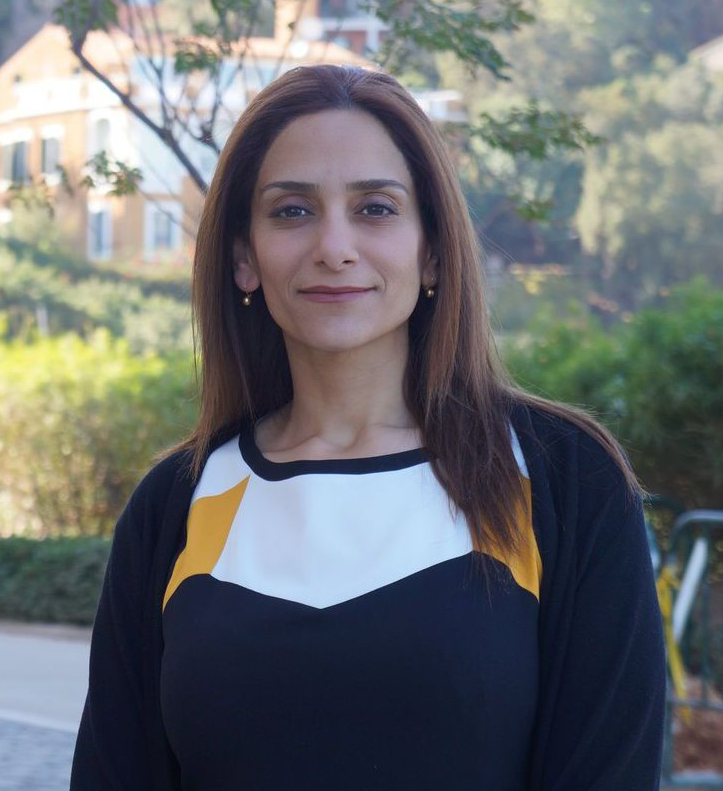
- Born: 1975, Halifax, Nova Scotia, Canada
- Occupation: Full Professor with Tenure

Academic background
- Education: PhD (2008), Applied Social Psychology
- Alma mater: American University of Beirut; University of Windsor

Academic work
- Institutions: Telfer School of Management, University of Ottawa; Olayan School of Business, American University of Beirut
- Main interests: Inclusive Human Resource Systems | Business Ethics | Leadership Development | Feminist Praxis
- Website: https://charlottekaram.com

Charlotte M. Karam is a Lebanese–Canadian university professor and scholar-activist known for her work in inclusive human resource systems, business ethics, leadership development, and feminist praxis. She currently holds the Ian Telfer Professorship in Inclusive Human Resource Systems at the Telfer School of Management, University of Ottawa.

== Background and career ==
Charlotte Karam completed her B.A. degree in psychology at the American University of Beirut before pursuing an M.A. in applied social psychology at the University of Windsor. She furthered her academic journey by obtaining her Ph.D. from the University of Windsor, focusing on the intersection of business ethics, public policy, and feminist praxis. Her first academic posting was at the Olayan School of Business (OSB), American University of Beirut, where she held various academic and administrative positions from 2008 to 2021, including department chair, associate dean, and founding director of the Center for Inclusive Business and Leadership (CIBL) for Women. Since 2021, she has been a professor at the Telfer School of Management, where she served as the director of the EMBA program. She continues to maintain an affiliation with OSB as an adjunct professor and primary investigator of The SAWI Project.

Throughout her academic career, she has been actively involved in research projects funded by various organizations, including UN Women, UNDP, the European Commission, and the U.S. Department of State Middle East Partnership Initiative. Dr. Karam has led several projects aimed at advancing women's contributions to the economy in the Middle East and North Africa. Notably, she spearheaded the development of sector-based measures for women's recruitment, retention, and promotion in workplaces.

She was listed among the 100 Most Influential People in Gender Policy by Apolitical and also was featured on the University of Bath’s Thinklist 30. Her work has also been acknowledged twice (2018, 2022) as one of AACSB International’s Innovations that Inspire.

Dr. Karam has also contributed to numerous academic journals and serves as a co-editor in chief of the Journal of Business Ethics.
