= Myrie =

Myrie is a surname. Notable people with the surname include:

== Association football ==
- David Myrie (born 1988), Costa Rican footballer
- Kenay Myrie (born 2006), Costa Rican footballer
- Roy Myrie (born 1982), Costa Rican footballer

== Other ==
- Clive Myrie (born 1964), British journalist and presenter
- Eliza Myrie (born 1981), American artist
- Evelyn Myrie (born 1959), Canadian community activist
- Zellnor Myrie (born 1986), American politician
