= Tehama =

Tehama may refer to:

- Tehama bonifatella, a species of the moth in the monotypic genus Tehama
- Tehama, California, United States, a city
  - Tehama County, California, in which the city is situated
- Mount Tehama, a now-eroded volcano in the Cascade Range in northern California
- Tihamah, a region of the western Arabian Peninsula
- Tehama Inc., a Desktop-as-a-Service vendor
