= Hussein Fazal =

Canadian-born American entrepreneur

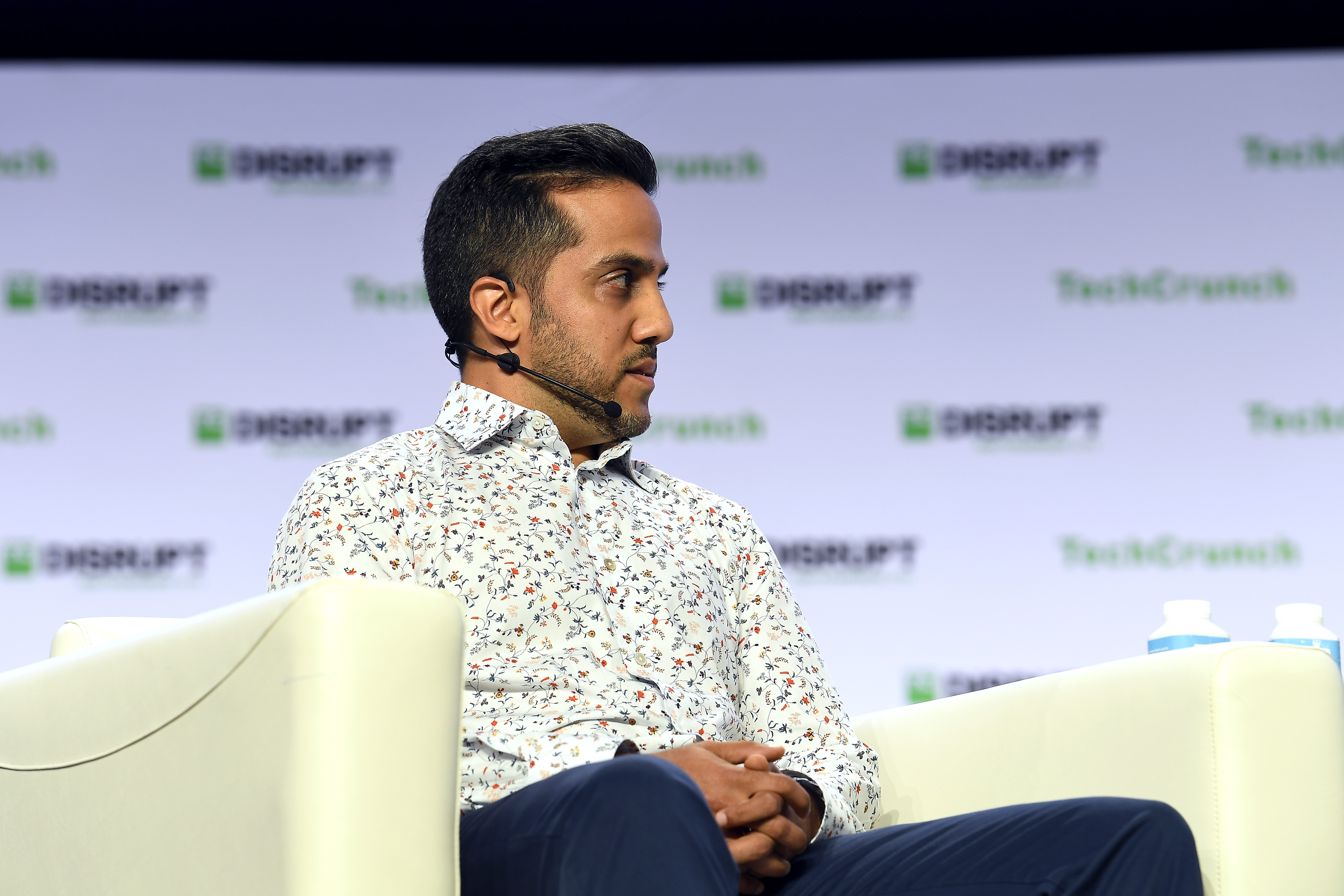
- Born: Vancouver, Canada
- Education: University of Waterloo
- Occupation: Entrepreneur
- Years active: 2008-present
- Organization(s): Super.com, AdParlor
- Board member of: CrowdRiff

Hussein Fazal is a Canadian-born American serial entrepreneur based in San Francisco. He is the co-founder and CEO of Super.com, an American technology company. Previously, Fazal co-founded AdParlor, one of the earliest Facebook ad optimization companies, later acquired by AdKnowledge in 2011.

== Early life and education ==
Fazal was born and raised in Vancouver, Canada. His family are Ismaili Muslims.

Fazal attended the University of Waterloo, where he earned a computer science degree. Fazal also attended Waterloo's co-op program along with Henry Shi. In 2011, He was accepted into the NEXT 36 program.

== Career ==
Fazal started his career as a software developer at Bell Canada in 2008. Later that year, he along with Kristaps Ronka co-founded AdParlor, a bootstrapped Facebook and X ad optimization platform. As one of the first companies to focus on performance marketing for social media, AdParlor worked with advertisers to scale their campaigns. The company generated over $100 million in revenue and later in 2011 was acquired by AdKnowledge.

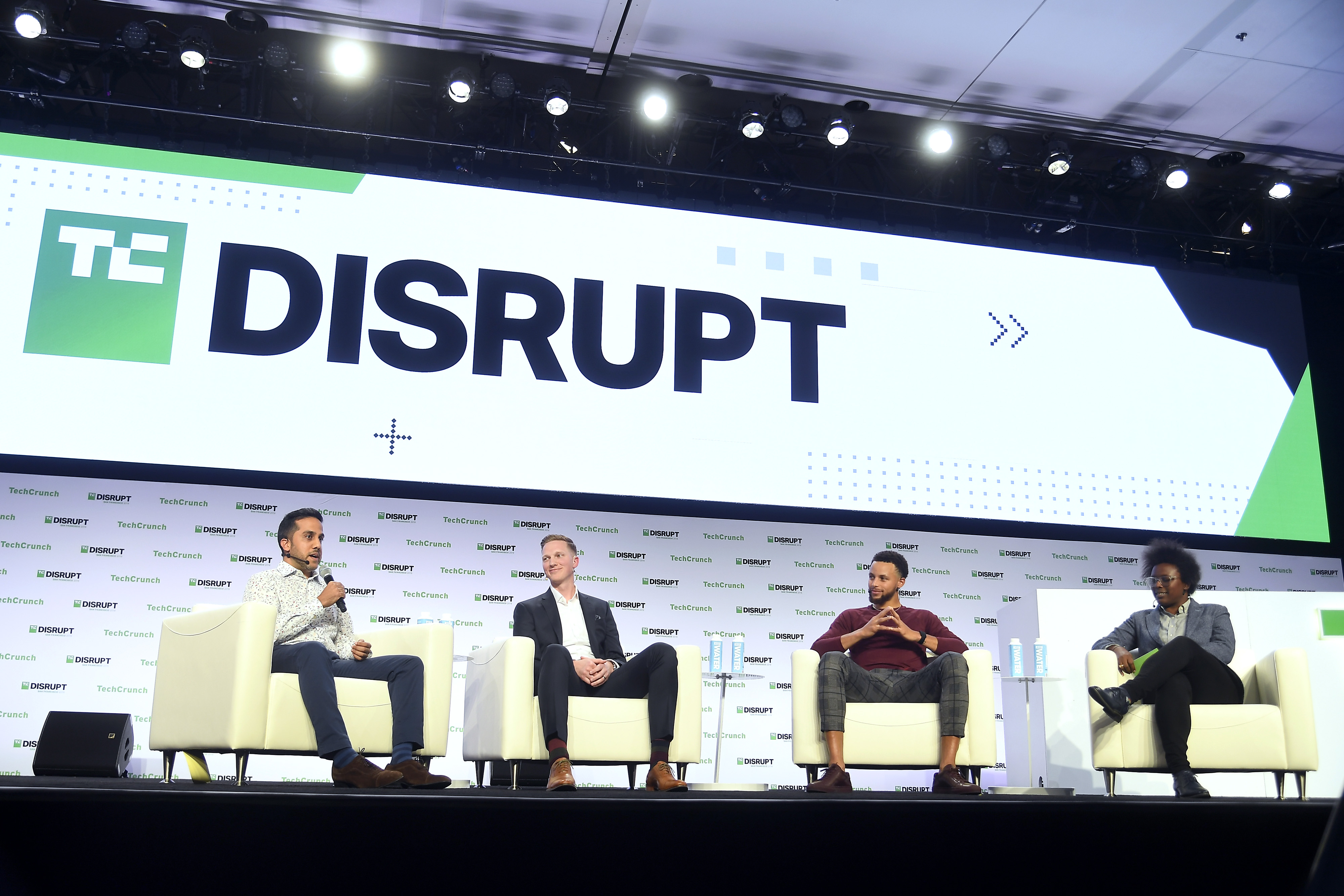
Hussein Fazal at the TechCrunch Disrupt San Francisco 2019

In 2016, Fazal co-founded SnapTravel, a conversational AI platform designed to help users book hotels via SMS and messaging apps like WhatsApp. Over time, SnapTravel expanded its offerings, integrating financial tools and retail discounts, and rebranded briefly to SnapCommerce and then Super.com in 2022. In 2024, Super.com was named one of the America's fastest growing companies by Financial Times. In March 2025, Fazal spoke about 'the rise of Super Apps in the year 2024' at South by Southwest along with Ben Shen of Cash App and Loren Kosloske of Uber. Later that year in October, he hosted a session on 'The Modern Company' with Shopify president Harley Finkelstein in the Canadian Elevate Festival. Fazal has written for TechCrunch and Ad Age.

== Awards and recognition ==
- Forbes Fintech 50, 2023
- Entrepreneur of the Year Ontario region, EY Entrepreneur of the Year, 2022
- 30 Most Creative People In Advertising Under 30, Business Insider, 2012
- 30 Under 30, Inc. Magazine, 2011
