= Paul Vallée =

Canadian businessman (born 1972)

- Born: March 7, 1972 (age 54)
- Education: University of Ottawa
- Employer: Tehama Inc.
- Known for: Pythian, Tehama, Basic Income Canada Network
- Title: Founder and chief executive officer
- Website: Paul Vallée - Tehama

Paul Vallée (born 1972) is a Canadian data specialist and businessperson. He is the founder and chief executive officer of Tehama Inc., a company offering a secure virtual-workforce platform in a Software as a Service paradigm.

== Life and career ==
Vallée holds a bachelor's degree in Management Information Systems from the University of Ottawa. He started his career as a data scientist and continued as a systems architect; by the age of 25 (1997), he had started his fourth company — database infrastructure management, architecture, and performance outsourcing company, Pythian. He received the Ottawa Forty Under 40 award from the Ottawa Business Journal in 2011, an award that recognizes the achievements of forty business people under the age of forty.

In 2014, he was appointed Chief Executive Officer (CEO) of Pythian. In the same year, he was awarded the Trudeau Medal from the Telfer School of Management of the University of Ottawa. This recognizes the leadership, initiative, and contributions of Telfer alumni to the business world, the community, and their alma mater.

In 2016, the Canadian Women in Communications and Technology organization awarded Vallée the Diversity Champion Award for "[having] publicly spoken out against the 'bro culture'" in the technology industry, and for "[having] made Pythian the first Canadian company to release its gender statistics and set clear goals to recruit more capable women."

In 2019, Vallée led the evolution of a new company, Tehama, from Pythian, based on cybersecurity and compliance technologies developed and employed at the latter company. He is CEO of Tehama, and continues to sit on Pythian's board of directors.

Vallée is a proponent of basic income. He serves on the board of directors for the Basic Income Canada Network, Canada's national basic income advocacy organization.

In the early phases of the COVID-19 pandemic, Vallée publicly argued for greater pandemic preparedness in businesses and organizations, with special regard to remote work strategies and policies.

Vallée also advocates for a Canadian national data strategy. In this pursuit, he has published with the Centre for International Governance Innovation.
