= Lieutenant Governor of Ontario =

Provincial representative of the monarch of Canada in Ontario

- Emblem of the lieutenant governor

- Standard of the lieutenant governor of Ontario

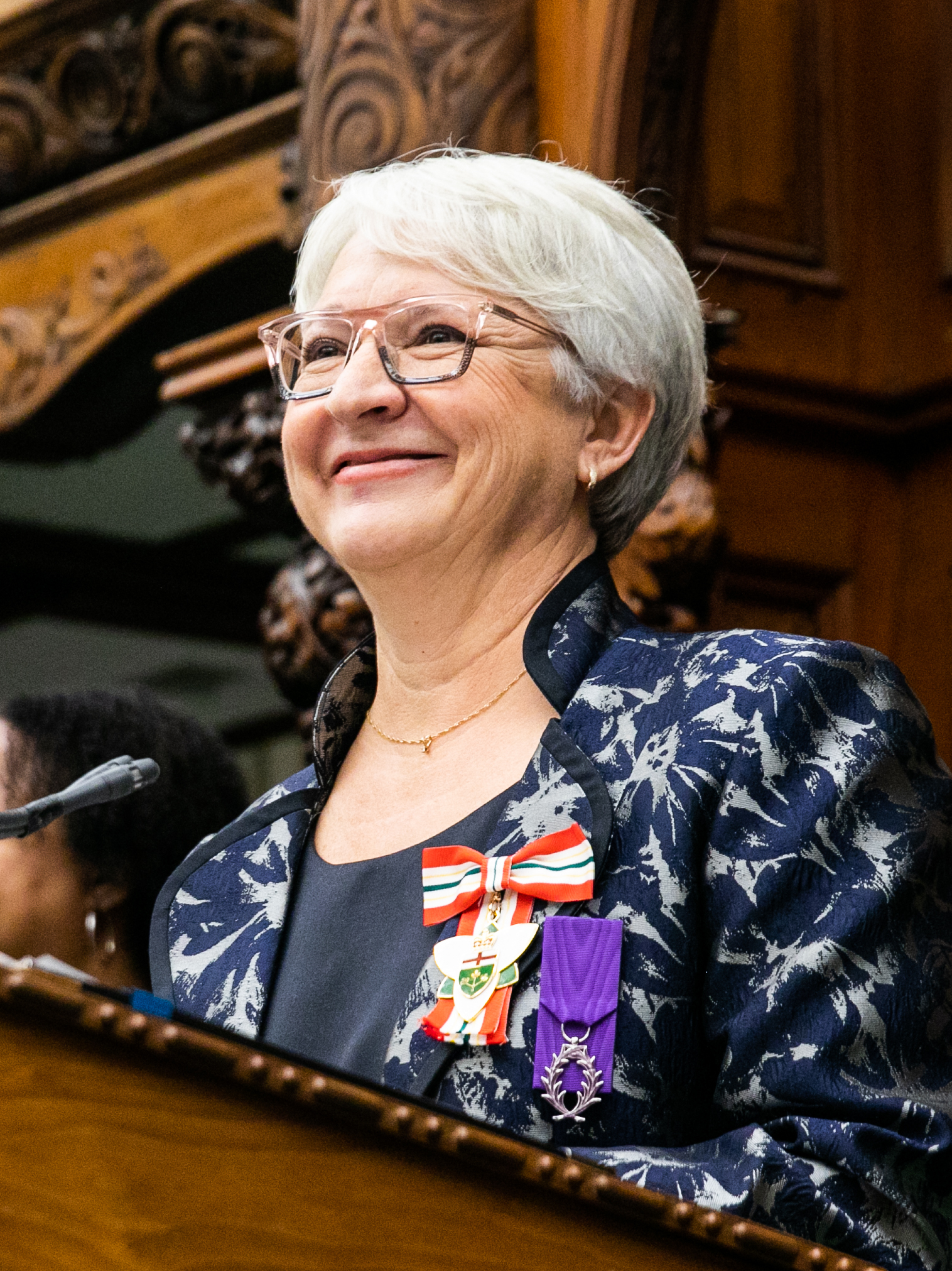
- Incumbent; Edith Dumont since 14 November 2023
- Viceroy
- Style: Her Honour the Honourable
- Nominator: Prime Minister of Canada
- Appointer: Governor General of Canada
- Term length: Five year term with dismissal only for cause; can continue in office after five years, at the governor general's pleasure
- Constituting instrument: Constitution Act, 1867
- Formation: 1 July 1867
- First holder: Henry William Stisted
- Website: www.lgontario.ca

The lieutenant governor of Ontario (/lɛfˈtɛnənt/, in French: Lieutenant-gouverneur (if male) or Lieutenante-gouverneure (if female) de l'Ontario) is the representative of the monarch of Canada, Canada's constitutional head of state, in the province of Ontario. The lieutenant governor, in normal circumstances, discharges the sovereign's ceremonial functions and exercises the formal constitutional authority of the Crown on the sovereign's behalf with the advice and consent of the Ontario cabinet. The lieutenant governor operates distinctly from the governor general and acts only on the advice of the Ontario cabinet on matters within provincial jurisdiction. Similar to the role of the governor general, the office holder performs a wide range of ceremonial and civic duties and attends community events in similar manners as the royal family and the governor general.

The lieutenant governor is appointed by the governor general on the nomination of the prime minister for terms no shorter than five years. During the first five years, the lieutenant governor can only be removed by the governor general "for cause assigned", reported to both houses of Parliament. The current lieutenant governor of Ontario is Edith Dumont, sworn in on November 14, 2023.

== Role and presence ==
The office of lieutenant governor is created by the Constitution Act, 1867 which sets out the office's authorities, duties and rules of engagement.

=== Formal constitutional functions ===
Ontario is a province within the federation of Canada, a constitutional monarchy. In this framework, the lieutenant governor exercises the duty of monarch in relation to the Government of Ontario, namely appoints individuals with electoral mandate to be government ministers, and on the advice of these ministers takes action in the monarch's name.

In carrying out this governor-in-council function, the lieutenant governor acts within the tight confine of written law and constitutional conventions, and in practice exercises virtually no discretion in policy setting or decision implementation. For example, convention dictates that the lieutenant governor appoint the member of the legislative assembly who commands the confidence of the legislature as premier and appoint individuals nominated by the premier as ministers of the Crown to the council of ministers. Once a ministry is in office, the government's executive power, including prerogative power, is formally exercised in the sovereign's name through written instructions issued by the lieutenant governor called orders-in-council. Provincial legislations are enacted upon the lieutenant governors giving royal assent in the sovereign's name.

In policy areas under provincial jurisdiction, the lieutenant governor represents the sovereign directly and their authority is unfettered by the governor general or the federal government.

=== Reserve Power ===
By constitutional convention, the lieutenant governor is required to act in accordance to the advice of the cabinet. Therefore, the authorities mentioned above is largely ceremonial. In theory, lieutenant governor as viceroy may invoke reserve powers in exceptional circumstances, such as in a constitutional crisis, to deny the cabinet's request for the dissolution of the legislature or to dismiss a cabinet no longer in command of the legislature's confidence. The exercise of such power is subject to intense debate by constitutional scholars and armchair pundits alike. While there had been recent precedents of such power being exercised in another province, there had been no documented instances in which the lieutenant governor of Ontario made such a decision.

It was however a possibility following the 1985 provincial election that reduced the incumbent Progressive Conservative Miller ministry to minority. Premier Frank Miller contemplated publicly about seeking dissolution of the legislature less than two months after the previous election. Whether Lieutenant Governor John Black Aird in any way indicated to Miller his likely response to such a request is unknown. Miller ultimately opted to face certain defeat in the legislature and advised the lieutenant governor in his resignation letter that Liberal leader David Peterson "would appear" to be in command of the confidence of the legislature, sparing Aird the test of his reserve power.

=== Ceremonial and civic roles ===
In reality, the day-to-day function of the lieutenant governor are mostly ceremonial. For instance, the lieutenant governor acts as patron of certain Ontario institutions, such as the Royal Ontario Museum. Also, the viceroy, themselves a member and Chancellor of the order, inducts individuals into the Order of Ontario, and upon installation customarily becomes a Knight or Dame of Justice and the Vice-Prior in Ontario of the Most Venerable Order of the Hospital of Saint John of Jerusalem. The LG, as the office holder is often referred to in government operation, regularly discharges duties in support of the citizenship function of the provincial government through presentation of various provincial honours and decorations to individual Ontarians in recognition of their civic contributions, including awards that are named for and presented by the lieutenant governor; these are generally created in partnership with another government or charitable organization and linked specifically to their cause. These honours are presented at official ceremonies, which count amongst hundreds of other engagements the lieutenant governor partakes in each year, either as host or guest of honour. The lieutenant governor also regularly attends community events and engagement on invitation, and issues greetings or congratulatory scrolls upon requests. As a statistical example, former lieutenant governor Elizabeth Dowdeswell conducted 1,066 civic engagements in an eighteen-month period, at a rate of 711 engagements per year.

Standard of the lieutenant governor of Ontario from 1981 to 2026

Standard of the lieutenant governor of Ontario from 1870 to 1959, and again from 1965 to 1981

Standard of the lieutenant governor of Ontario from 1959 to 1965

At these events, the lieutenant governor's presence may be marked by the post's official flag, consisting of a blue field bearing the escutcheon of the Arms of his Majesty in Right of Ontario surmounted by a crown and surrounded by ten gold maple leaves, symbolizing the ten provinces of Canada. At Ontario government events, the lieutenant governor ranks first in the order of precedence.

Since 2011, the incumbent lieutenant governor has served ex officio as the Colonel of the Regiment of the Queen's York Rangers, a unit in the Canadian Army. The honorary appointment recognizes the regiment's links to John Graves Simcoe, the first lieutenant governor of Upper Canada and the regiment's commander during the American War of Independence.

== History ==
A similar predecessor office existed from 1791 to 1841, when southern Ontario was the British Colony Upper Canada. The office was subordinate to the office of the Governor General of the Canadas (and later of British North America), though some office holders held the both posts simultaneously. The first office holder was John Graves Simcoe a military officer who named Lake Simcoe and Simcoe County in honour of his father. Sir Isaac Brock, namesake of numerous locales and structures in Ontario, held the office in an acting capacity.

The office of the lieutenant governor of Ontario came into being in 1867, upon the creation of Ontario at Confederation. Since that date, 30 lieutenant governors have served the province. Until the late 1990s, most lieutenant governors were former politicians or key figures in the two main parties., among whom were notable firsts:

- Pauline Mills McGibbon, appointed in 1974 on the advice of Prime Minister Pierre Trudeau, was the first woman to hold a viceregal office in Canada.
- Lincoln Alexander, appointed in 1985 on the advice of Prime Minister Brian Mulroney, was the first black person and the first visible minority Canadian to hold a viceregal office in Canada; he was also the first black Canadian elected MP.

The shortest tenure by a lieutenant governor of Ontario was of Henry William Stisted. He was the senior military commander in Canada West at Confederation, and was appointed provisional lieutenant governor, holding office from 1 July 1867 to 14 July 1868. The longest tenure was of Albert Edward Matthews, from November 1937 to December 1946.

=== Official residence ===
An official residence, known as the Government House, was provided to the lieutenant governor between 1800 and 1937.

- The first government house was located at Fort York, and was destroyed when a nearby powder magazine exploded in 1813 during the War of 1812.
- The Elmsley House, a purchased residence, situated near the First Ontario Parliament Buildings, served as the Government House from 1815 to 1841
- Third Government House was custom build and was completed in 1870, and was sold to the Canadian Pacific Railway in 1912
- Chorley Park, a custom built French Renaissance style châteaux in Rosedale, served as the Government House between 1915 and 1937. It was one of the most expensive residences ever constructed in Canada at the time and outshone even Rideau Hall in size and grandeur.

With the election in 1937 of the Liberal Party to a majority in the Legislative Assembly, the lieutenant governor in Ontario was targeted for spending cutbacks. Government House was closed and the viceroy given a suite at the Legislative Building as a replacement. Ontario was the first province in to not have a government house, but was soon followed by other provinces.

== See also ==
- Government of Ontario
- Great Seal of Ontario
- Lieutenant Governor (Canada)
- Monarchy in the Canadian provinces

Order of precedence
Preceded by Pierre Poilievre as Leader of the Official Opposition	Order of Precedence of Canada as Lieutenant Governor of Ontario	Succeeded by Manon Jeannotte as Lieutenant Governor of Quebec
