= Super.com =

American technology company

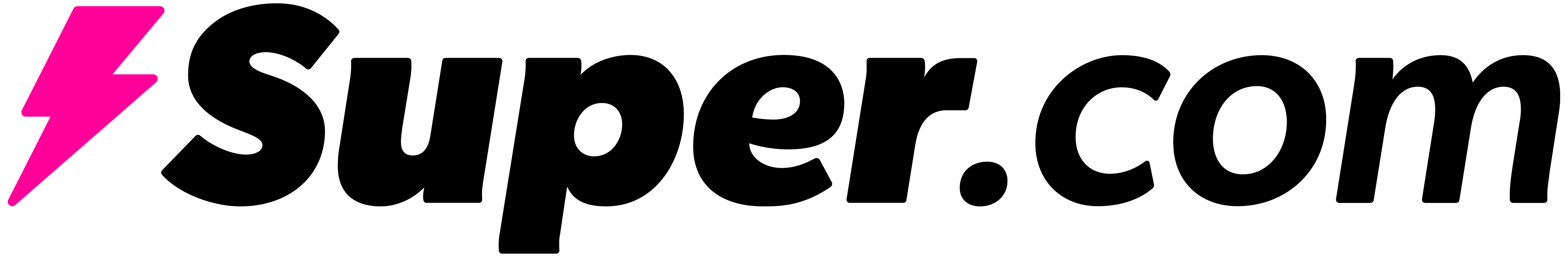
- Formerly: SnapTravel; Snapcommerce
- Type: Private
- Industry: Technology
- Founded: 2016
- Founder: Hussein Fazal and Henry Shi
- Headquarters: San Francisco, United States
- Services: Financing; Travel agency
- Number of employees: 225 (2025)
- Website: super.com

Super.com (formerly Snapcommerce and SnapTravel) is a technology company headquartered in San Francisco and co-founded by Hussein Fazal and Henry Shi. The company provides financial services, including reward programs and travel bookings.

== History ==
Super.com was officially founded by Hussein Fazal and Henry Shi in April 2016. The company's first product was SnapTravel, a platform for finding and booking hotel deals via SMS and messaging platforms like WhatsApp. In July of the same year, the company raised $1.2 million during a seed round.

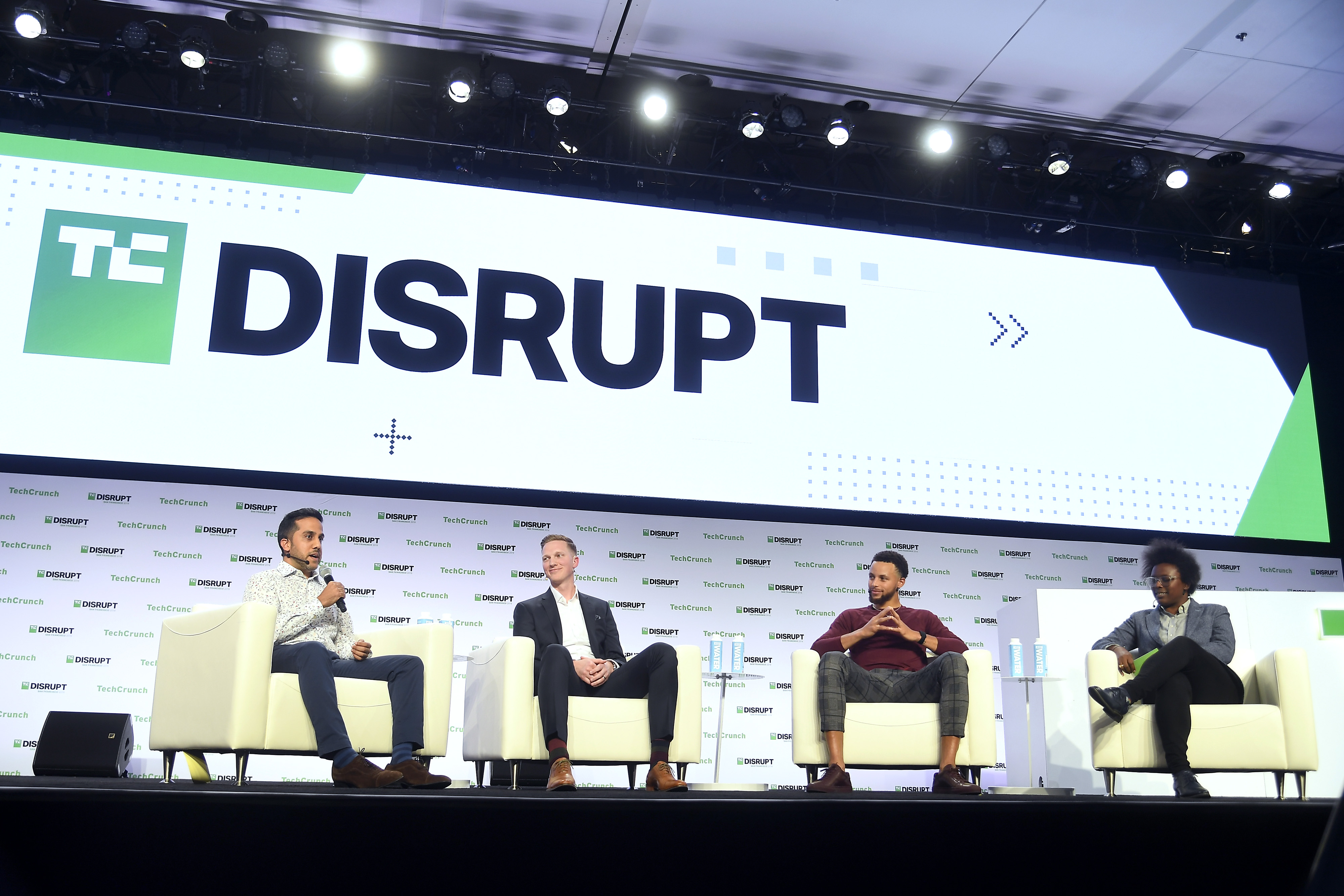
Hussein Fazal, Stephen Curry, and TechCrunch Senior Reporter Megan Rose Dickey during TechCrunch Disrupt San Francisco 2019

In 2021, according to Deloitte, the company was named the 5th fastest growing company in North America. It raised $85 million in a Series B round in the same year led by Inovia Capital and Lion Capital.

In October 2022, Snaptravel was renamed Super Travel, and the parent company Snapcommerce was renamed Super. The domain name Super.com was acquired for an undisclosed amount.

In 2023 Super launched new financial products, including cash advance, earning products, loyalty programs and credit building tools. Later that year, Financial Times ranked Super.com as the 11th fastest growing company in North American region.

In 2024 Super.com launched its Super+ membership program, offering members additional savings and exclusive products. Super.com has processed over $2 billion in sales since launch.

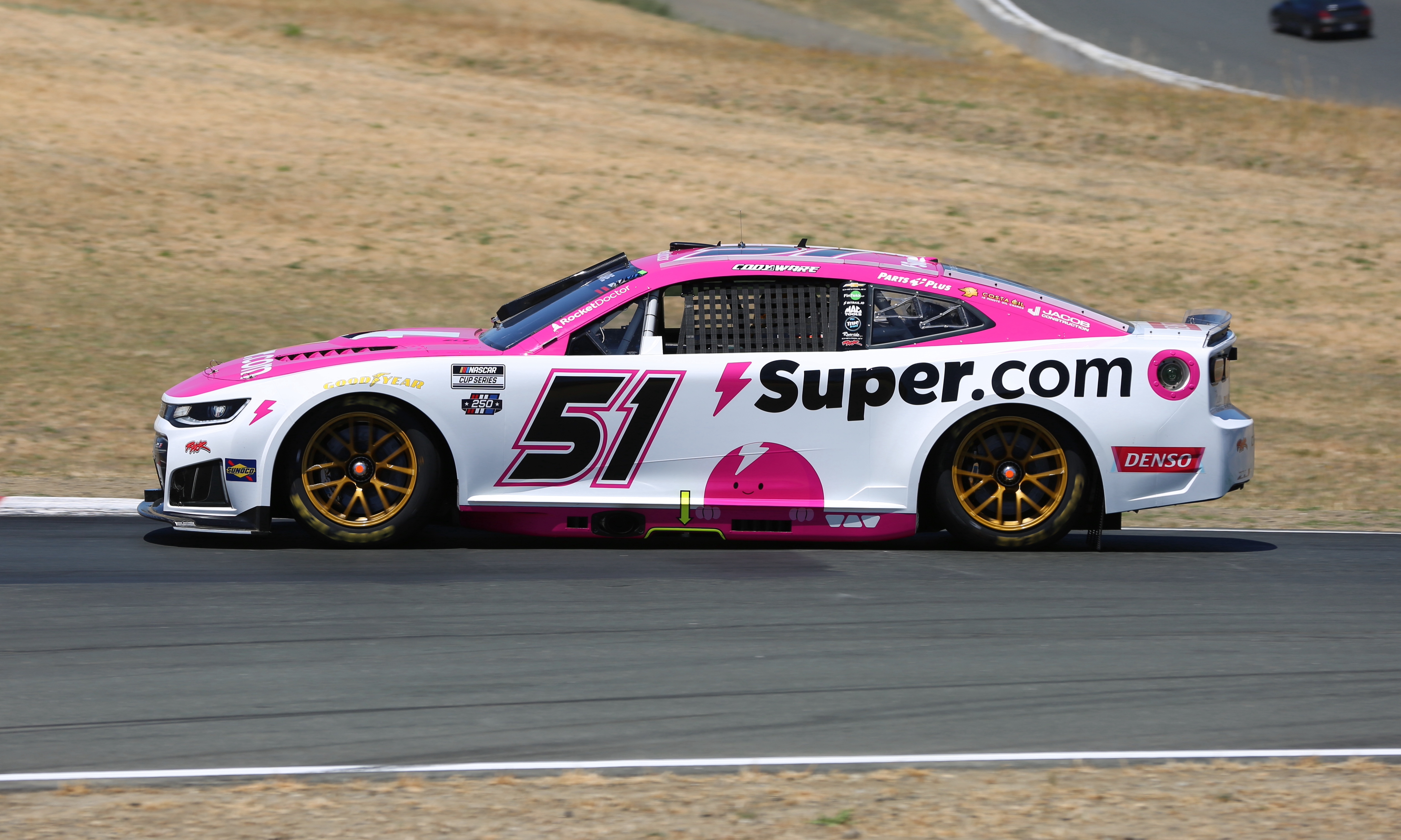
Cody Ware's Super.com-sponsored race car at Sonoma Raceway

In March 2026, Super.com became the official savings partner of NASCAR for the 2026 season. Earlier that month, Super.com had debuted as the primary sponsor of Cody Ware's No.51 RWR Chevrolet at Phoenix Raceway.

=== Investments ===
The company received venture capital funding from firms including iNovia Capital, Titanium Ventures, and Acrew Capital. Individual investors include basketball player Steph Curry, Shopify president Harley Finkelstein, and software engineer Neha Narkhede.

Super.com raised $1.2 million seed round in 2016. This was followed in 2017 by a $8 million Series A round. In 2021 the company raised an $85 million Series B round led by Inovia Capital and Lion Capital and another $85 million Series C round in 2023, also led by Inovia Capital.Later that year Super.com was named under Forbes fintech 50 list. According to Fortune, In 2026, Series D round led by TPG Inc. raised $65 million, valuing the company at $1.2 billion.

== Publications ==
- Satchu, Reza, and Tom Quinn. "SnapTravel: Betting on 'Super.com'." Harvard Business School Case 824-196, June 2024.
