= Hélène Campbell =

Canadian organ donation activist

Hélène Campbell (born April 18, 1991) is a Canadian activist who has raised awareness for organ donation, largely through documenting her own need for new lungs via social media and by attracting support from celebrities including Justin Bieber and Ellen DeGeneres.

== Hélène's story ==
Campbell had suffered from breathing problems from a young age. When she was 12, she was misdiagnosed with asthma. She was prescribed various inhalers, which did not improve her condition. Her health deteriorated as she grew older and she would experience shortness of breath and frequent coughing fits.

In September 2011, her pulmonary function was only 26 per cent and she was admitted to the Ottawa Hospital Rehabilitation Centre for four weeks. By October, it had dropped to 24 per cent. She was diagnosed with advanced idiopathic pulmonary fibrosis, an incurable and degenerative disease that causes scarring and thickening of the lungs. She was told she would need a double lung transplant. Since lung transplants were not done in Ottawa, she and her mother moved to Toronto in January 2012 to be placed on the transplant waiting list.

As her condition continued to worsen, she became an ambassador for organ donation. She launched a website, alungstory.ca, as well as a Twitter account, where she chronicled her wait for a transplant. Using the hashtag #BeAnOrganDonor, she rallied her followers to encourage celebrities to spread awareness about organ donation. On January 21, 2012, her campaign was re-tweeted by Justin Bieber. She also caught the attention of celebrities such as Ellen DeGeneres, Jann Arden, Howie Mandel, and Don Cherry.

In February, Campbell appeared on The Ellen DeGeneres Show through Skype to talk about her cause to encourage people to register as organ donors.

By March, Campbell's pulmonary function had decreased to 20 per cent. In early April, however, her condition began to deteriorate rapidly and, on April 4, she was admitted to Toronto General Hospital. Her pulmonary function fell to just six per cent. On April 6, Campbell underwent a successful double lung transplant at the Toronto General Hospital. Given the precarious state of Campbell's health, her doctors opted to perform a lobar transplant, using only a portion of the donor's lungs, rather than wait for a donor with a similar body frame. The operation took seven hours and involved a 10-member team.

In February 2013, Campbell appeared on The Ellen DeGeneres Show in person where she and DeGeneres danced to Bieber's Baby.

Since her transplant, Campbell has continued to raise awareness about organ donation. Among other things, in 2013, she launched the Give2Live campaign to raise money to cover equipment, travel, and accommodation expenses for patients awaiting transplants.

In September 2017, Campbell received a second double lung transplant, as her body was gradually rejecting the lungs she had received in 2012.

== The Hélène Effect ==
Between December 2011 and April 2012, more than 8,000 people in Ottawa registered to be organ donors, a surge the Trillium Gift of Life Network attributed to the Helene Campbell effect.

== Awards and recognition ==
On May 23, 2012, Campbell received a Queen Elizabeth II Diamond Jubilee Medal, awarded by Prime Minister Stephen Harper in recognition of her work in raising awareness of the importance of organ donation. In November, she was inducted into the Order of Ottawa.

In 2013, Campbell received the Community Builder Award from the United Way.

In 2016, the western extension of Jockvale Road in Barrhaven was renamed Hélène Campbell Road. The street is located only a few blocks from the home where Campbell grew up.

In 2018, the City of Ottawa awarded Campbell the Key to the City.
