= Elizabeth Dowdeswell =

Lieutenant Governor of Ontario from 2014 to 2023

The Honourable Elizabeth Dowdeswell OC OOnt
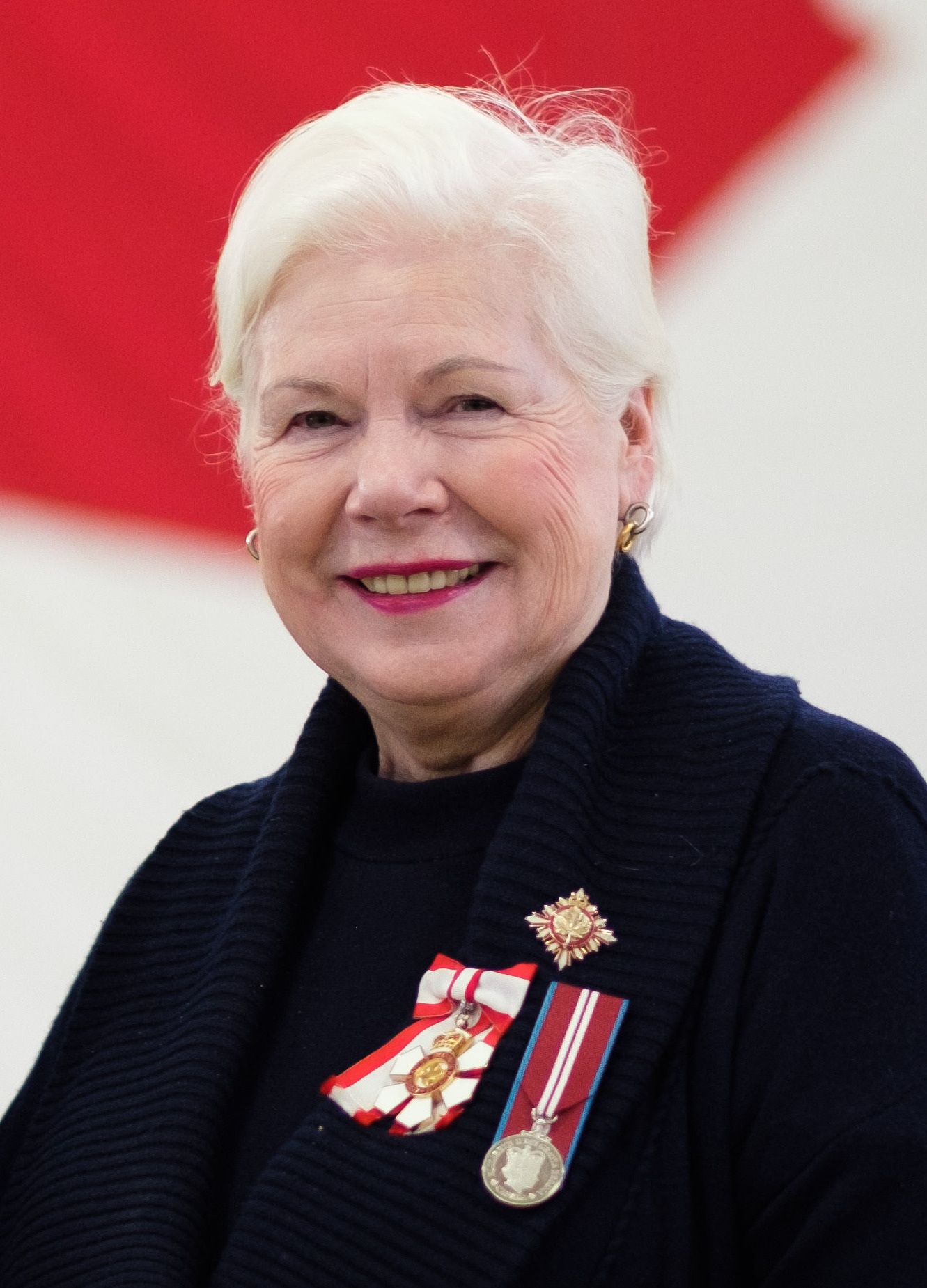
- Dowdeswell in 2020

29th Lieutenant Governor of Ontario
- In office September 23, 2014 – November 14, 2023
- Monarchs: Elizabeth II; Charles III
- Governors General: David Johnston; Julie Payette; Mary Simon
- Premier: Kathleen Wynne; Doug Ford
- Preceded by: David Onley
- Succeeded by: Edith Dumont

3rd Executive Director of the United Nations Environment Programme
- In office 1992–1998
- Secretary-General: Boutros Boutros-Ghali; Kofi Annan
- Preceded by: Mostafa Kamal Tolba
- Succeeded by: Klaus Töpfer

Personal details
- Born: Violet Elizabeth Patton; November 9, 1944 (age 81) Belfast, Northern Ireland
- Education: University of Saskatchewan (BSc, TC); Utah State University (MSc)
- Occupation: Civil servant

Violet Elizabeth Dowdeswell (née Patton; born November 9, 1944) is a Canadian civil servant who served as the 29th lieutenant governor of Ontario from 2014 to 2023. As lieutenant governor, Dowdeswell was the viceregal representative of the Crown in Right of Ontario. A champion of civil society, environmental protection, inclusive growth and liberal democracy, she is also the longest-serving lieutenant governor in Ontario's history. (Note: Albert Edward Matthews, Ontario's 16th lieutenant governor, previously held this record, serving from November 30, 1937, to December 26, 1946. Dowdeswell surpassed his tenure of nine years and 26 days on October 20, 2023.) (Note: Building resilience and sustainability through inclusive prosperity, environmental stewardship, and social cohesion, as well as safeguarding democracy, have been the focus of her mandate.)

== Early life ==
Violet Elizabeth Patton was born in Belfast, Northern Ireland, on November 9, 1944. She moved with her family to Canada in 1947, settling in rural Saskatchewan. Her father, Desmond Granville Patton (1920-2008), was a minister of the United Church of Canada. Dowdeswell married at a young age but soon divorced. She attended the University of Saskatchewan and Utah State University, and she later became a teacher and university lecturer.

== Career ==
Dowdeswell left teaching and entered public service as a special assistant to Saskatchewan's deputy education minister for two years (1976–78), then worked as deputy minister of culture and youth during the New Democratic Party government of Allan Blakeney. She was then dismissed, along with other deputy ministers, after the Progressive Conservative government of Grant Devine took power in 1982.

She held various positions in the federal public service during the 1980s, working at one point as assistant deputy minister at Environment Canada with responsibility for the Atmospheric Environment Service and negotiating the Framework Convention on Climate Change. She also led a public inquiry into Canada's unemployment benefits program and federal water policy.

In 1992, Dowdeswell was selected to lead the United Nations Environment Programme in Nairobi, Kenya, serving a full four-year term and a one-year extension until she resigned in 1998.

From 1998 to 2010, she was an adjunct professor at the McLaughlin-Rotman Centre for Global Health at the University of Toronto, while also serving as founding president and CEO of the Nuclear Waste Management Organization. From 2010 until her appointment as Lieutenant Governor, she was the president and CEO of the Council of Canadian Academies.

== As lieutenant governor ==
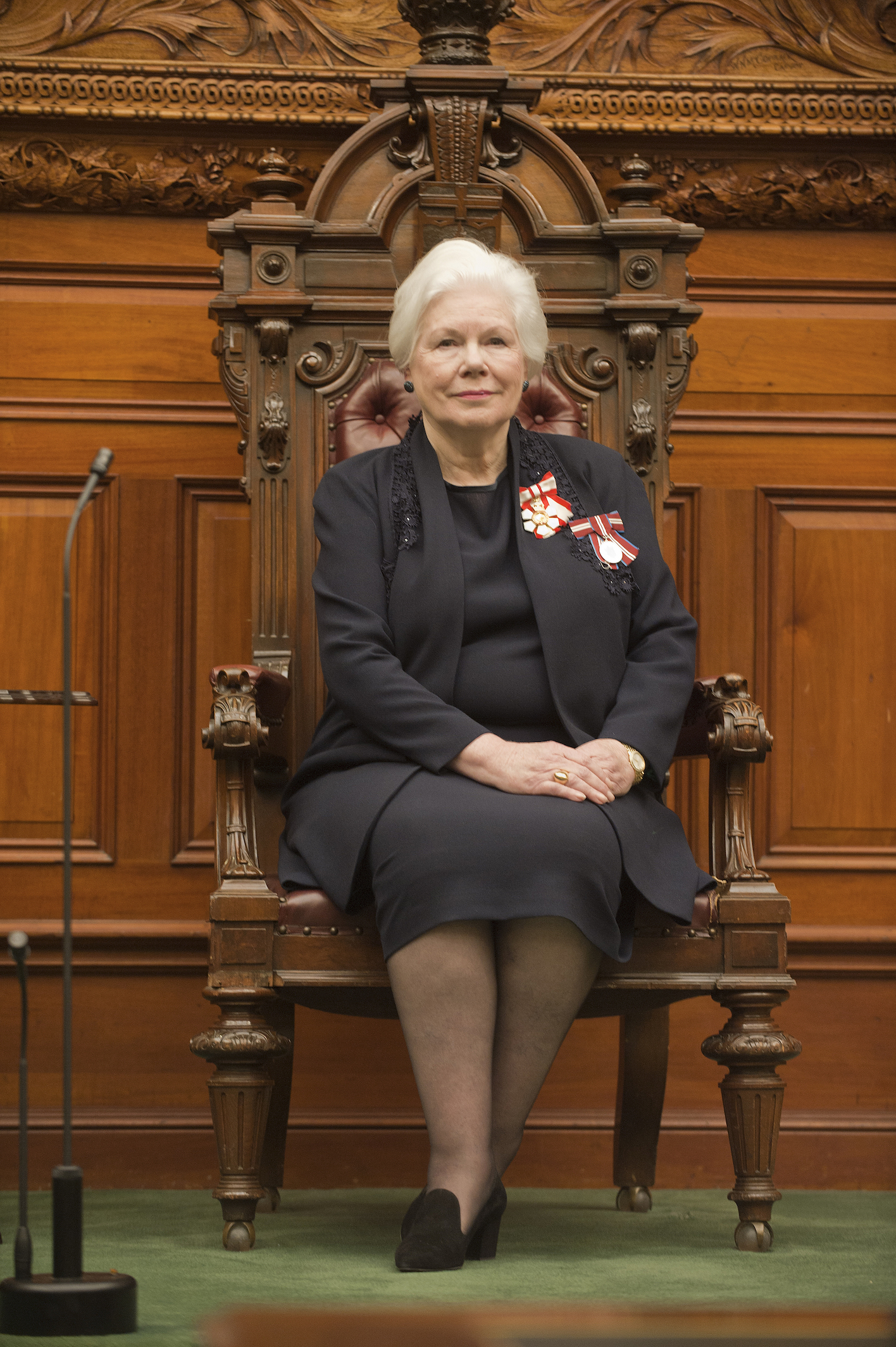
Dowdeswell seated on the throne during her installation ceremony in 2014

Dowdeswell was appointed as lieutenant governor by Governor General David Johnston on the advice of Prime Minister Stephen Harper, who selected Dowdeswell from a shortlist devised by the Advisory Committee on Vice-Regal Appointments. On September 23, 2014, she was sworn in during a ceremony held at Queen's Park in Toronto. She is the third woman to serve in the position, after Pauline Mills McGibbon and Hilary Weston.

Dowdeswell declared in her installation address that she would not immediately espouse a particular area of focus during her time as lieutenant governor. Instead, she said she would engage the people of Ontario, listening to their concerns and ideas. She has since adopted "sustainability" and "Ontario in the world" as personal themes. In addition, Dowdeswell has called herself Ontario's unofficial "Storyteller-in-Chief".

According to annual reports published on her office's website, Dowdeswell has conducted, on average, more than 700 public engagements yearly as lieutenant governor, as well as numerous visits abroad to the United States, the United Kingdom, France, Italy, Switzerland, Germany and Denmark. She has visited all of Ontario's provincial electoral districts.

On September 22, 2022, the Russian Ministry of Foreign Affairs announced the addition of Dowdeswell, alongside other Canadian lieutenant governors, to the country's so-called stop list banning entry to Russian territory.

Dowdeswell's mandate came to an end on November 14, 2023, and she was succeeded by Edith Dumont.

== Titles, styles, honours and arms ==
=== Titles and styles ===
As a former lieutenant governor in Canada, Dowdeswell is entitled to be styled the Honourable for life. She had the additional style of Her Honour while in office.

=== Honours ===
Ribbon bars of Elizabeth Dowdeswell

Appointments

- May 24, 2012: Officer of the Order of Canada (OC)
- November 26, 2014: Dame of Justice of the Most Venerable Order of the Hospital of St. John of Jerusalem
  - November 26, 2014 – November 14, 2023: Vice Prior of the Priory of Canada of the Most Venerable Order of the Hospital of St. John of Jerusalem (while in office)
- September 23, 2014: Member of the Order of Ontario (OOnt)
  - September 23, 2014 – November 14, 2023: Chancellor of the Order of Ontario (while in office)

Medals

- (Canada) June 18, 2012: Queen Elizabeth II Diamond Jubilee Medal
- 2022: Queen Elizabeth II Platinum Jubilee Medal (Nova Scotia)
- (Canada) May 6, 2024: King Charles III Coronation Medal

Other awards

- November 18, 2020: Louie Kamookak Medal of the Royal Canadian Geographical Society

Honorary appointments

- (Canada) September 23, 2014 – November 14, 2023: Colonel of the Regiment of The Queen's York Rangers (while in office)
- September 23, 2014 – November 14, 2023: Honorary Commissioner of the Ontario Provincial Police

=== Honorary degrees ===
Dowdeswell has received several honorary degrees from various universities in Canada and Europe. These include:

Jurisdiction	Date	School	Degree
Saskatchewan	May 25, 1994	University of Saskatchewan	Doctor of Laws (LLD)
Nova Scotia	1998	Mount Saint Vincent University	Doctor of Humane Letters (DHL)
Ontario	Spring 1999	York University	Doctor of Laws (LLD)
British Columbia	October 22, 1999	Royal Roads University	
Saskatchewan	Spring 2001	University of Regina	
Ontario	2013	University of Ontario Institute of Technology	Doctor of Science (DSc)
Ontario	June 9, 2015	University of Western Ontario	Doctor of Laws (LLD)

=== Arms ===
Coat of arms of Elizabeth Dowdeswell
Crest Issuant from a circlet of garbs Or and trillium flowers proper, a demi-globe Azure resting thereon a balance Or. Escutcheon Azure on an oval Argent environed by two branches of laurel Or, a viceroy butterfly volant Purpure embellished Or. Supporters Two doves Argent beaked and legged Or each charged on the wing with an oval Purpure, that to the dexter bearing a Celtic cross, that to the sinister bearing a harp Or, and standing on a grassy mount Vert. Motto SERVIRE VITÆ IN TERRA (To Serve Life On Earth).

== Footnotes ==
Government offices
Preceded by David Onley	Lieutenant Governor of Ontario; 2014–2023	Succeeded by Edith Dumont
