= Bernard Poulin =

- Born: January 4, 1945 (age 81); Windsor, Ontario, Canada
- Spouse: Marie Charette-Poulin
- Children: 2

Bernard Aimé Poulin is a Canadian visual artist.

Bernard Aimé Poulin, a native of Windsor, Ontario, was born on 4 January 1945. He is married to retired (2015) Canadian Senator Marie-P. Charette-Poulin. They have two adult daughters, Elaine and Valérie.

== Artistic work ==
Poulin specializes in corporate and private portraiture as well as commissioned exhibitions. A Fellow of the Canadian Institute of Portrait Artists (CIPA) he was its President for the 2003–2005 term. Poulin has created portraits of politicians, royalty, corporate executives, artists, athletes and religious figures. His exhibitions include subjects such as Tuscany and Venice (1996), Provence (1998), Jerusalem (2000), Paris (2005) and a Grand Tour Exhibition in 2007.

Poulin also sculpts in bronze, using the lost wax process. As a muralist, he has created several three-dimensional, mixed-media projects such as the donor wall in the lobby of the Children's Hospital of Eastern Ontario, the Ottawa Children's Aid Society and the Solange Karsh Center for Medical Research.

== Publications ==
Poulin has participated in the creation of more than 10 books dedicated to the process of drawing. His articles and television appearances have been translated into Portuguese and Italian. He is the author of 11 of his own books. His Complete Colored Pencil Book was published by FW Publications (North Light division) in 1992. It has sold more than 75,000 copies in its first edition. Its French translation, Le crayon de couleur, was published in Paris in 1995. The softcover re-issue of The Complete Colored Pencil Book appeared in 2002 and was again re-released in a revised version under the banner of North Light Classics in 2011.

In December 2010, Poulin's 40-year research project on creativity was published under the title Beyond Discouragement – Creativity. Written in the form of a classic essay, it discusses the effects of the past century on creativity.

In 2015, On Life, Death And Nude Painting was published under the Classic Perceptions banner. This book's theme is the encouragement of "thinking."

== Legacy ==
In 1990 the Hadassah WIZO of Canada created the Bernard Aimé Poulin Scholarships for students pursuing studies in the visual arts.

In 2011, Poulin was named "chevalier" (knight) of the Order of La Pléiade|Ordre de la Pléiade by the Assemblée parlementaire de la francophonie, in recognition of his contribution to the visual arts and the French language and culture.

In June 2019, Poulin was awarded an Honorary Doctorate by Laurentian University of Sudbury.

On 14 July 2019, The Masterworks Museum of Bermuda unveils 4 major Poulin artworks for their collection. The Museum also celebrates the 46 years Poulin has been painting Bermuda and its people. The honorary Patron of this event was Dame Jennifer Smith, past Premier of Bermuda.

On 25 September 2019 the biography of the artist: Bernard Aimé Poulin - a portrait, un portrait is launched at the Galerie Jean-Claude Bergeron in Ottawa. The heavily illustrated biography was written by the author Benoît Cazabon.

On 21 November 2019, Poulin was awarded the Order of Ottawa by the Mayor Jim Watson.
