= Marie Charette-Poulin =

Canadian politician

The Honourable Marie-P. Charette-Poulin

Canadian Senator from Ontario
- In office September 21, 1995 – April 17, 2015
- Appointed by: Jean Chrétien

Personal details
- Born: June 21, 1945 (age 81) Sudbury, Ontario, Canada
- Party: Liberal
- Spouse: Bernard Poulin
- Children: 2

Marie-Paule Charette-Poulin (born June 21, 1945) is a Canadian politician. She represented Northern Ontario in the Senate of Canada from September 1995 until her resignation in April 2015. She was the president of the Liberal Party of Canada from 2006 to 2008.

== Early life and education ==
Born as Marie-Paule Charette in Sudbury, Ontario, on June 21, 1945. She attended Laurentian University, graduating with a Bachelor of Arts in 1966. In 1969, at the University of Montreal, Charette-Poulin obtained her Master's of Social Science.

Before politics, Charette-Poulin worked for CBC/Radio-Canada, as a university lecturer, and as a radio producer.

Marie-Paule left the CBC/Radio-Canada fold to become Deputy Secretary to the Cabinet at the Privy Council Office.

== Political career ==
In September 1995, Charette-Poulin was called to the Senate on the recommendation of Prime Minister Jean Chrétien. She represented Northern Ontario for the Liberal Party of Canada from 1995 to 2015.

Charette-Poulin was a member of the Senate Committee on National Finance, a member of the Senate Standing Committee on Agriculture and Forestry, of the Senate Standing Committee on Official Languages, of the Senate Standing Committee on Internal Economy, Budgets and Administration, of the Senate Standing Committee on National Security and Defence and of the Standing Committee on Banking, Trade and Commerce. She chaired the Senate Standing Committee on Transport and Communications, and as Chair of the Communications Subcommittee, she led the review on Canada's national and international position in communications and telecommunications.

Charette-Poulin was the first woman to chair the Senate Liberal Caucus and the first senator to chair the Northern Ontario Liberal Caucus. From December 2006 to April 2008, she served as President of the Liberal Party of Canada. Charette-Poulin ran for the presidency of the Liberal Party of Canada at the party's leadership convention in 2006. She defeated former MP Tony Ianno and party activist Bobbi Ethier to win the election. She was the second woman and first francophone woman to hold this position.

Charette-Poulin suffered a mild stroke in April 2008. Although she was expected to make a full recovery, she said that she would be stepping down immediately as Liberal Party President, saying that she was now unable to put in the many hours a week that the party job demanded.

On January 29, 2014, Liberal Party leader Justin Trudeau announced that all Liberal Senators, including Charette-Poulin, were removed from the Liberal caucus, and would continue sitting as independents. According to Senate Opposition leader James Cowan, the Senators would still refer to themselves as Liberals even if they were no longer members of the parliamentary Liberal caucus.

Charette-Poulin resigned from the Senate on April 17, 2015, for health reasons.

== Personal life ==
Charette-Poulin is married to international portrait artist Bernard A. Poulin. They have two adult daughters, Elaine and Valerie.

== See also ==
- List of Ontario senators

Party political offices
Preceded by Mike Eizenga	President of the Liberal Party of Canada; 2006–2008	Succeeded by Doug Ferguson
