= Order of Ottawa =

Awarded by the Mayor of Ottawa
- Type: Municipal order
- Established: 2012
- Eligibility: Residents of Ottawa
- Criteria: Recognition of citizens for a high level of achievement and significant contributions to the city
- Founder: Jim Watson
- Mayor: Mark Sutcliffe

Statistics
- Total inductees: 165
- Ribbon of the Order of Ottawa

The Order of Ottawa is a municipal honour awarded to residents of the city of Ottawa. Instituted in 2012, the order is administered by the incumbent mayor of Ottawa and recognizes individuals for their high level of achievement and significant contributions to the city.

== History ==
The order was established in 2012 by then-mayor Jim Watson to recognize achievement by citizens of Ottawa in various fields. The order is open to any resident of Ottawa who has made significant contributions to the community through career and volunteer work.

== Insignia ==
Recipients of the order receive a medal bearing the city's coat of arms on a green and blue ribbon, echoing the colours of the civic flag. As an unofficial award lying outside the Canadian order of precedence (decorations and medals), neither the medal nor its ribbon may be worn or mounted with Canadian honours.

== Notable recipients ==
Since its inception in 2012, the following notable individuals have received the order:

- 2012: John Cameron Bell
- 2012: Hélène Campbell
- 2012: Jim Durrell
- 2012: Russell Mills
- 2013: Raymond Desjardins
- 2015: Guy Cousineau
- 2015: Bryan Murray
- 2015: Allan Rock
- 2016: Brian Coburn
- 2016: Harley Finkelstein
- 2016: Chris Phillips
- 2016: Dave Smart
- 2016: Mark Sutcliffe
- 2017: Thomas d'Aquino
- 2017: Edith Dumont
- 2017: Cyril Leeder
- 2017: Todd Nicholson
- 2018: Lawrence Greenspon
- 2019: Roland Armitage
- 2019: Claude Bennett
- 2019: Kathleen Edwards
- 2019: Jean-Michel Lemieux
- 2019: Madeleine Meilleur
- 2019: Bernard Poulin
- 2020: Bob Monette
- 2021: Jeff Hunt
- 2022: Harvey Glatt
- 2023: Anne Merklinger
- 2023: Marianne Wilkinson
- 2024: Lisa Weagle
- 2025: Jim Watson
- 2025: Jo-Anne Polak

== See also ==
- Order of Montreal
- Order of Hamilton
