= Tehama Inc. =

Canadian IT services company

Tehama Technologies
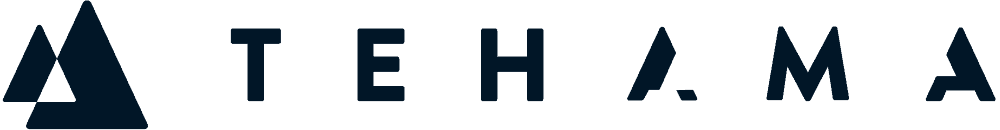
- Type: Private
- Industry: Internet, IT Services, IT Consulting
- Founded: September 2019; 6 years ago Ottawa, Ontario, Canada
- Founders: Paul Vallée
- Headquarters: Ottawa, Ontario, Canada
- Area served: Worldwide
- Services: Virtual Desktop Infrastructure, Service Delivery Platform
- Number of employees: 50-100.
- Website: tehama.io

Tehama (/təˈheɪmə/ tə-HAY-mə) is a Canadian Software as a service (SaaS) company headquartered in Ottawa, Ontario, that provides a virtual, cloud-based, Desktop as a Service (DaaS) platform for the secure exchange of work over the internet, allowing organizations to securely manage remote workers, third-party vendors, and freelancers, and integrate them into their working environments.

== History ==
Tehama began as a suite of virtual desktop, zero-trust network access, auditable secret and file sharing and workflow-automation technologies enabling secure, remote Internet-based work amongst the global workforce and clientele of Pythian, an IT services company founded in 1997. In September 2018, to offer the Tehama platform to the public, CEO and entrepreneur Paul Vallée launched Tehama as a subsidiary business unit of Pythian.

In September 2019, in response to a surge in demand for the Tehama platform, the Tehama unit was spun-off as a company in its own right, independent of Pythian. Financing for this venture was provided by the New York-based private equity firm Mill Point Capital, which thereby gained a majority stake in Pythian. Vallée left his position at Pythian to become Tehama's CEO.

As one of Tehama's core services facilitates remote work, the company saw a notable upswing in interest in March 2020 during the COVID-19 crisis, with a 35-fold increase in inquiries from the prior month. By May 2020, having seen its client base grow to more than 150, Tehama announced that it had raised US$10,000,000 through Series A funding round led by OMERS Ventures.

In July 2020, Tehama conducted the Digital by Default Summit, an online virtual conference on the subject of remote work, with particular focus on its greater adoption in the wake of the COVID-19 crisis. The event occurred again in 2021 and featured a closing fireside chat with remote work expert Kate Lister.

== See also ==
- Remote work
- Platform as a Service
- Desktop as a Service
