= Dalton Pompey =

Canadian baseball player (born 1992)

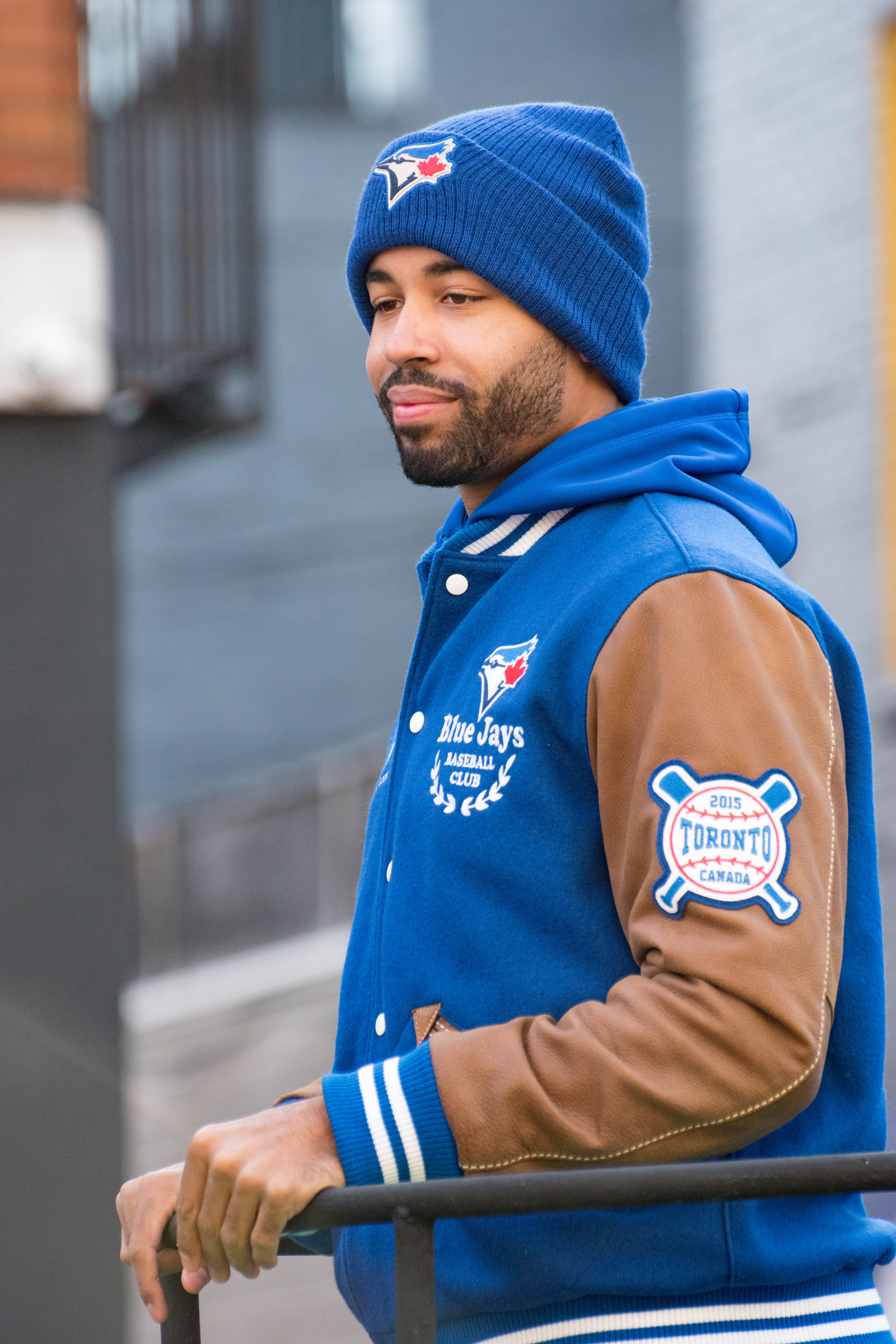
- Pompey with the Toronto Blue Jays
- Center fielder
- Born: December 11, 1992 (age 33); Mississauga, Ontario, Canada
- Batted: Switch Threw: Right

MLB debut
- September 2, 2014, for the Toronto Blue Jays

Last MLB appearance
- May 11, 2018, for the Toronto Blue Jays

MLB statistics
- Batting average: .221
- Home runs: 3
- Runs batted in: 10
- Stats at Baseball Reference

Teams
- Toronto Blue Jays (2014–2016, 2018)

Dalton Kenrick Pompey (born December 11, 1992) is a Canadian former professional baseball center fielder. He played in Major League Baseball (MLB) for the Toronto Blue Jays. After five seasons in the minor leagues, Pompey made his MLB debut on September 2, 2014, becoming only the sixth player born in Ontario to play for the Blue Jays. He left the team in 2019 and played for several others until retiring from baseball in 2022 after a stint with the Guelph Royals of the Intercounty Baseball League, although he re–signed with the Royals in 2024.

== Professional career ==
=== Toronto Blue Jays ===
Pompey was drafted by the Toronto Blue Jays in the 16th round of the 2010 MLB draft out of John Fraser Secondary School in Mississauga, Ontario. He made his professional debut for the Gulf Coast League Blue Jays that season, hitting .191 with two home runs and five runs batted in (RBI) in 11 games. Pompey spent 2011 with the Gulf Coast League Blue Jays and Bluefield Blue Jays. Overall, he played in 60 games and hit .239 with five home runs, 17 RBI, and 23 stolen bases.

Pompey played in only 20 games in 2012 due to a broken left hand. Splitting time with Bluefield, the Vancouver Canadians, and the Lansing Lugnuts, he hit .286 with eight RBI and five stolen bases. He returned to Lansing in 2013 to play in 115 games, and finished the year batting .261 with six home runs, 40 RBI, and 38 stolen bases. After the season, he was awarded a minor league Gold Glove Award, playing the full season without recording an error.

Pompey started the 2014 season with the Dunedin Blue Jays, and was named to the 2014 All-Star Futures Game on June 24, 2014. Up to his selection to the team, he had posted a .313/.392/.460 triple-slash line in 67 games, along with six home runs and 27 stolen bases. Pompey was promoted to the Double-A New Hampshire Fisher Cats on June 27, 2014, and to the Triple-A Buffalo Bisons on August 20. On August 26, the Blue Jays organization announced that Pompey would play for the Mesa Solar Sox of the Arizona Fall League at the completion of the 2014 season. He finished the 2014 minor league season with a .313 batting average, nine home runs, 52 RBI, and 43 stolen bases in 112 games played. On September 3, Pompey was named to Baseball America's Second Team All-Stars for 2014.

On September 1, 2014, Pompey was announced as one of the Blue Jays' September call-ups. He made his MLB debut against the Tampa Bay Rays on September 2 as a pinch-runner for Edwin Encarnación. After three additional appearances as a pinch-runner, Pompey had his first at-bat on September 10 against the Chicago Cubs and earned an RBI on a groundout to first base. On September 19, Pompey recorded his first Major League hit, a single to right-field against New York Yankees starting pitcher Hiroki Kuroda. Three days later he earned his first MLB multi-hit game and run in a 14–4 win over the Seattle Mariners. Pompey would hit his first career home run, a solo shot to right field, off Mariners ace Félix Hernández the following day. Playing against the Baltimore Orioles on September 26, Pompey had the best game of his young career, posting two runs scored and two RBI by hitting his first double and two triples, finishing the night 3–4. He became the third Blue Jays rookie to record two triples in one game, and first since Alex Ríos in 2005.

Prior to the start of the 2015 season, MLB named Pompey the number two prospect in the Blue Jays' organization, the 7th best outfield prospect in baseball, and the 43rd overall prospect on their top 100 list. Pompey opened the 2015 season as the starting centre fielder for the Blue Jays. He struggled to open the season, batting just .193 through 23 games, and on May 2 he was optioned back to Triple-A Buffalo. After continuing to struggle at the Triple-A level, Pompey was sent down to Double-A New Hampshire on June 6. On September 1, Pompey was called up by the Blue Jays. He appeared in 34 games for the Blue Jays in the 2015 regular season, and batted .223 with two home runs, six RBI, and five stolen bases. Pompey was on the Blue Jays postseason roster, appearing mostly as a pinch runner. In five postseason games, he recorded a single in his lone at-bat, as well as four stolen bases.

Pompey attended 2016 Major League spring training, and was optioned to minor league camp on March 18. He played with the Buffalo Bisons until September 1, when he was called up by the Blue Jays. Pompey played in eight games for the Blue Jays in 2016, mostly as a pinch runner. He scored three runs and stole two bases. He was added to the Wild Card roster but did not play in the game. Pompey was not on the Division Series roster, but was added to the Championship Series roster on October 14.

During the 2017 World Baseball Classic, Pompey suffered a concussion as he slid into second base during a play and was subsequently placed on the 60-day disabled list by the Blue Jays. He did not make an appearance with Toronto during the 2017 season.

On May 4, 2018, Pompey returned to the majors for the first time since 2016 in a game against the Tampa Bay Rays. On May 12, he was optioned down to the Triple-A Buffalo Bisons. In a May 29, 2018 game for Buffalo, Pompey suffered a partial tear of the ulnar collateral ligament in his left thumb, sustaining the injury sliding headfirst into third base. He did not appear in the majors again that year as he continued to rehab in the minor leagues.

Before a March 21, 2019 spring training game, Pompey was pulled from the lineup after he hit his head on some bats at the top of his locker before the game. Pompey was diagnosed with a concussion and was placed on the injured list. On April 2, Pompey was transferred to the 60-day injured list. On July 23, 2019, Pompey was designated for assignment. He spent the remainder of the 2019 season in the minors and on November 4, 2019, Pompey elected free agency.

=== Arizona Diamondbacks ===
Pompey signed a minor league contract with the Arizona Diamondbacks on February 24, 2020. He did not play in a game for the organization due to the cancellation of the minor league season because of the COVID-19 pandemic. On May 22, Pompey was released by the Diamondbacks.

=== Sugar Land Lightning Sloths ===
In July 2020, Pompey signed on to play for the Sugar Land Lightning Sloths of the Constellation Energy League (a makeshift 4-team independent league created as a result of the COVID-19 pandemic) for the 2020 season. He played in 4 games for the club, notching only 1 hit in 14 at-bats.

=== Los Angeles Angels ===
On April 21, 2021, Pompey signed with the Québec Capitales of the Frontier League. However, before the beginning of the Frontier League season on May 9, Pompey signed a minor league contract with the Los Angeles Angels organization. Pompey split time in 2021 with the Double-A Rocket City Trash Pandas and the Triple-A Salt Lake Bees, hitting .276 with 5 home runs and 12 RBI. On August 25, Pompey was released by the Angels.

=== Guelph Royals ===
On March 25, 2022, Pompey signed with the Royals. In 30 games for the team, he batted .381 with five home runs, 22 RBI, and 13 stolen bases. Pompey announced his retirement following the 2022 season in order to pursue a career in emergency services.

On July 24, 2024, Pompey came out of retirement and re–signed with the Royals. He became a free agent following the season.

== International career ==
Pompey was selected to the Canada national baseball team at the 2017 World Baseball Classic, 2019 Pan American Games Qualifier, and 2019 WBSC Premier12.

== Personal life ==
Pompey's parents are Ken and Valerie Pompey, who taught him to switch-hit at age 3. He has a brother, Tristan, and a sister, Kayla. Tristan is also a professional baseball player most recently with the Guelph Royals.

Pompey's father Ken was also known to TV viewers as the dancing cowboy on the popular Canadian TV program Electric Circus. His stint on the program was later commemorated by Great Lakes Brewery with a custom beverage called Electric Circus Tropical Pale Ale. In 2023, Pompey joined the Hamilton Police Service to work as a police officer.
