= Edith Dumont =

Lieutenant Governor of Ontario since 2023

Her Honour the Honourable Edith Dumont OOnt
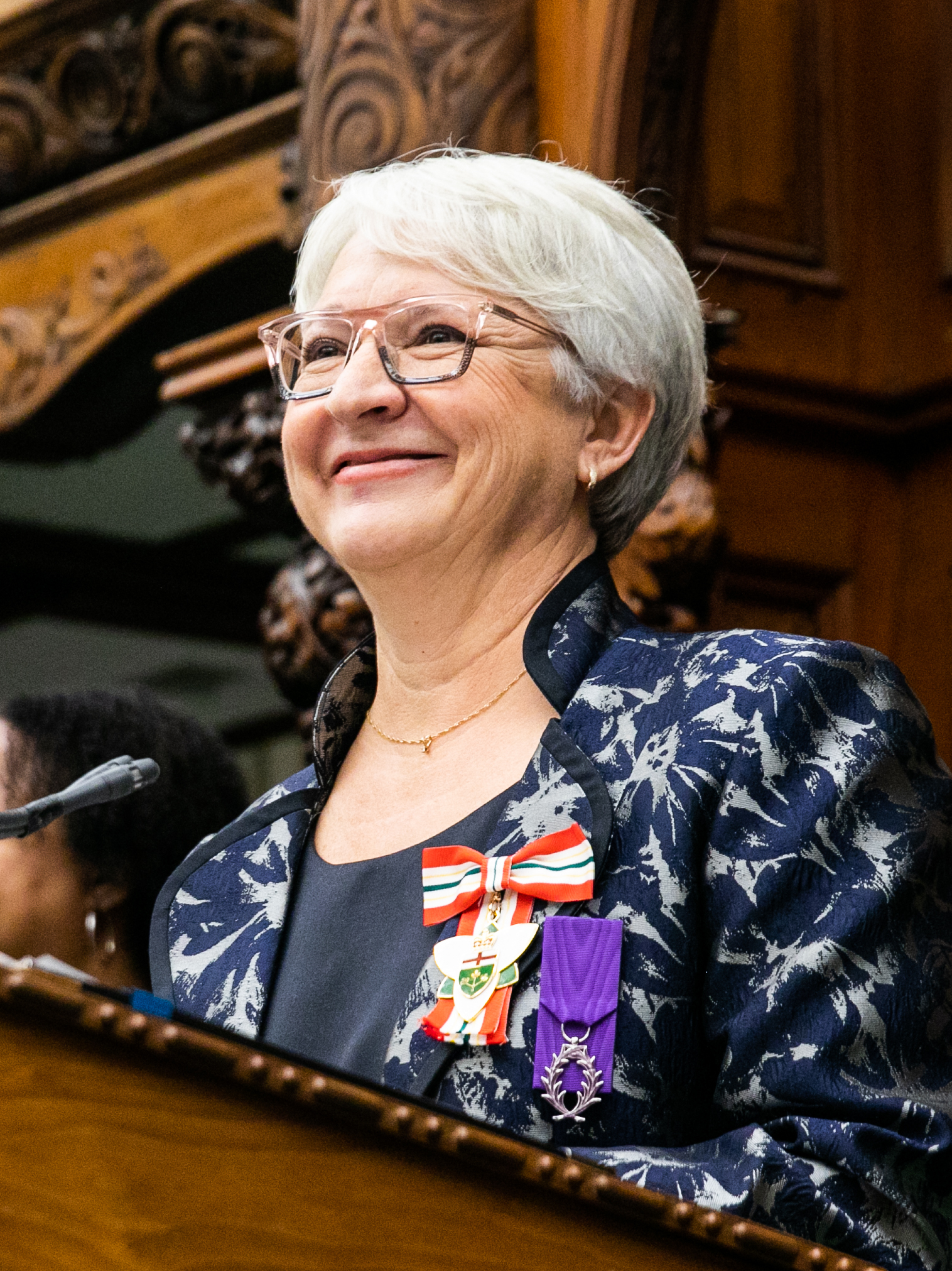
- Dumont in 2023

30th Lieutenant Governor of Ontario
- Incumbent
- Assumed office November 14, 2023
- Monarch: Charles III
- Governors General: Mary Simon; Louise Arbour
- Premier: Doug Ford
- Preceded by: Elizabeth Dowdeswell

Personal details
- Born: 1964 (age 61–62) Salaberry-de-Valleyfield, Quebec, Canada
- Spouse: Tony Viscardi (m. 1993)
- Children: 3
- Education: University of Ottawa (BA, MEd); University of Montreal; Université du Québec en Outaouais
- Occupation: Educator
- Website: www.lgontario.ca

Edith Dumont (born 1964) is a Canadian educator who has served as the 30th lieutenant governor of Ontario since November 14, 2023.

== Early life and education ==
Dumont was born in 1964 in Salaberry-de-Valleyfield, Quebec. She was educated at the University of Ottawa, graduating with a Bachelor of Arts (BA) in psychology in 1985 and a Master of Education (MEd) in 1997, the Université de Montréal, completing a specialization in psychology in 1986, and the Université du Québec en Outaouais, graduating with a Bachelor's degree in orthopedagogy in 1988.

== Career ==
Dumont worked for the Conseil des écoles publiques de l'Est de l'Ontario for 30 years, becoming its director of education and secretary-treasurer. She was the first woman to lead the board. From April 2020 until her viceregal appointment, she served as vice-president of partnerships, communities and international relations at the Université de l'Ontario français in Toronto. She has served on the boards of the Regroupement national des directions générales de l’éducation, Office des télécommunications éducatives de langue française de l’Ontario and the Ottawa Network for Education.

== Lieutenant Governor of Ontario ==
On August 3, 2023, Dumont's appointment by Mary Simon, Governor General of Canada (representing Charles III, King of Canada), on the advice of Justin Trudeau, Prime Minister of Canada, as the 30th lieutenant governor of Ontario was announced. She is the first Franco-Ontarian lieutenant governor and the fourth woman to serve in the position, after Pauline Mills McGibbon, Hilary Weston, and Elizabeth Dowdeswell.

Dumont was sworn-in during a ceremony in the legislative chamber at the Ontario Legislative Building on November 14, 2023. She was received in audience by King Charles III at Buckingham Palace on November 20, 2024.

Following the request of Premier Doug Ford, Dumont dissolved the 43rd Parliament of Ontario in January 2025, issuing writs for the 2025 general election. Following the election, she opened the 44th Parliament of Ontario.

== Personal life ==
Since 1993, Dumont has been married to Tony Viscardi, an aerospace engineer and former officer in the Canadian Armed Forces. They have three children: Éloïse, Antoine and Gabrielle.

== Titles, styles, honours and arms ==
Viceregal styles of Edith Dumont (2023–)
- Reference style: Her Honour the Honourable
- Spoken style: Your Honour

As a lieutenant governor in Canada, from November 14, 2023, Dumont is entitled to be styled "The Honourable" for life and "Her Honour" while in office.

Ribbon Bar of Edith Dumont

=== National honours ===
==== Appointments ====
Jurisdiction	Date	Honour	Ribbon	Post-nominal letters
Ontario	November 14, 2023 – present	Chancellor of the Order of Ontario (Note: Ex officio as lieutenant governor.)		
Ontario	November 14, 2023 – present	Member of the Order of Ontario		OOnt
Canada	November 14, 2023 – present	Vice Prior of the Priory of Canada of the Most Venerable Order of the Hospital of Saint John of Jerusalem		
Canada	November 14, 2023 – present	Dame of Justice of the Most Venerable Order of the Hospital of Saint John of Jerusalem		DStJ (Note: Post-nominal letters used only within the organization.)

==== Decorations ====
Jurisdiction	Date	Honour	Ribbon	Post-nominal letters
Canada	May 6, 2024	King Charles III Coronation Medal (Canadian version)		

=== Foreign honours ===
Country	Date	Appointment	Ribbon	Post-nominal letters
France	2018	Knight of the Order of Academic Palms		
France	December 10, 2025	Officer of the National Order of the Legion of Honour		

=== Honorary appointments ===
- November 14, 2023 – present: Colonel of the Regiment, The Queen's York Rangers (1st American Regiment)
- November 14, 2023 – present: Honorary Commissioner, Ontario Provincial Police

=== Non-national honours and awards ===
- 2021: Médaille de l'Ordre de la Pléiade de l'Ontario by l'Organisation internationale de la Francophonie
- 2020: Prix Bernard Grandmaître by le conseil régional d'Ottawa-Carleton of l'Association canadienne-française de l’Ontario
- 2017: Order of Ottawa by the City of Ottawa

=== Honorary degrees ===
- Doctorate honoris causa, Saint Paul University, June 19, 2026

=== Arms ===
Coat of arms of Edith Dumont

Crest
A hare holding an apple tree branch fructed proper and issuant from a coronet set with maple leaves Or and snowflakes Argent.
Escutcheon
Per chevron Azure and Or, three trilliums each florencé in chief and flory in base counterchanged.
Supporters
Two tree swallows volant proper.
Motto
AVEC ESPÉRANCE ET BIENVEILLANCE (With hope and kindness).

== Notes ==
Government offices
Preceded by Elizabeth Dowdeswell	Lieutenant Governor of Ontario; 2023–present	Incumbent
