= Order of Hamilton =

Canadian municipal order

Awarded by the mayor of Hamilton
- Type: Municipal order
- Established: April 10, 2019
- Eligibility: Residents of the city at the time of the awarding of the order
- Awarded for: Demonstrations of "exceptional voluntary contribution to community building and/or service in Hamilton"
- Status: Currently constituted
- Mayor: Andrea Horwath
- Post-nominals: O.H.
- Website: www.hamilton.ca/city-awards/order-hamilton/

Statistics
- First induction: January 5, 2020
- Total inductees: 30 (as of January 2022)

The Order of Hamilton is the most prestigious municipal order awarded to residents of the city of Hamilton. Instituted in 2019, the order is administered by the incumbent mayor of Hamilton for "significant volunteer achievements" in service to the city or communities therein.

== History ==
The order was announced on April 10, 2019, by then-mayor Fred Eisenberger, and the first orders were awarded on January 5, 2020, at the Mayor's New Year's Levee. The city created the order as a way to award "[t]he unsung heroes of our communities [who] are the endless volunteers".

Similar awards from other cities in Ontario include the Order of Vaughan, and the Order of Ottawa, and the Order of Montreal is awarded in the Province of Quebec.

== Recipients ==
Recipients are awarded the order annually at the Mayor's New Year's Levee.

2019

- Kathy Cooper
- Dave Glover
- Kenneth Hall
- Dr. Joan Heels
- Nancy Hewer
- Latisha Laing
- Nina Maljar
- Robin McKee
- Evelyn Myrie
- Dr. Anne Pearson

2020

- Rabia Saleem Awan
- Jim Cimba
- Dr. Margaret Denton
- Brenda Duke
- Mary Elop
- Anthony Frisina
- George Geczy
- Dr. Nadia Eva Rosa
- Raven Van Bommel
- Robert J. Wilkins

2021

- Randy and Susan Bassett
- Margaret Bennett
- Zaigham Shafiq Butt
- Ward Campbell
- Dr. Zobia Jawed
- Alex Moroz
- Nicholas Scime
- Edmund Shaker
- Mark Wu
- Rob Young

2022

- Bill Custers
- Mike Moore
- Karen Nelson
- Dr. Steven Zizzo
- Cathy Ferreira and Sidney Stacey
- Patricia Smith
- Jan Lukas

== See also ==
- Order of Montreal
- Order of Ottawa
