= Ian Telfer =

Canadian mining executive and entrepreneur

- Born: Oxford, England
- Education: University of Toronto, University of Ottawa
- Occupations: mining executive, entrepreneur

Ian Telfer is a British-born Canadian mining executive, entrepreneur and former chairman of Goldcorp Inc. Besides leading Goldcorp, he is known for founding and leading other Canadian mining companies, including TVX Gold, Silver Wheaton Corp., and Uranium One, as well as for his philanthropic efforts that include a donation of $25 million to the University of Ottawa's School of Management, now the Telfer School of Management.

== Early life and education ==
Ian Telfer was born in Oxford, England. Telfer's father, John Telfer, served as a Royal Air Force pilot, then as an accountant, while his mother worked as a schoolteacher. When Telfer was two years old, his family moved from England to Canada.

Telfer's family first lived in Moose Jaw, Canada for five years before moving to the Downsview neighbourhood of Toronto, which is where Telfer was raised. Telfer attended the University of Toronto, graduating from the university with a Bachelor of Arts degree in political science and economics in 1968. Telfer graduated with an uncertainty as to what to do with his life and what his next step would be.

At age twenty-five, following five years of working at "nondescript" sales jobs, Telfer realized he needed to "reboot" his life and applied to a number of MBA programs in Canada. Because of his grades, he was rejected by all of the schools. The day before classes began, Telfer was accepted to the University of Ottawa’s MBA program. In Telfer’s words, being accepted to this university’s MBA program changed his life and "kick-started everything".

After earning his MBA from the university in 1976, Telfer earned his certified accountant credentials, becoming a Fellow of the Institute of Chartered Accountants.

== Career ==
Telfer first worked at Hudson Bay Mining as a financial analyst. At Hudson Bay, Telfer learned the essentials of the mining business, such as strategic planning and how to evaluate businesses. As Telfer has explained in the past, "Everything I learned (about the mining business), I learned there." Though Telfer had no long-term plans of working in the mining industry, he credits getting a job at Hudson Bay as a "coincidental opportunity" and something that lit up his entrepreneurial ambitions.

After working at Hudson Bay, in 1983, Telfer, along with several other colleagues in the mining industry, formed TVX Gold, with Telfer serving as the company's chief executive officer. The ambition behind TVX Gold was to take advantage of the gold rush occurring in Brazil at the time. Telfer moved to Rio de Janeiro and spent the next six years leading TVX Gold in Brazil and working with mining executive and entrepreneur Eike Batista. TVX Gold would later merge with Kinross Gold Corp.

=== Vengold Inc. ===
After TVX Gold, in the 1990s, Telfer formed and led Vengold Inc. as its chief executive officer. Vengold was a gold mining company with ambitions of becoming the largest shareholder in Lihir Gold, a gold mining company based in Papua New Guinea.

In order to achieve this goal, Telfer led Vengold in purchasing shares of Lihir Gold from the government of Papua New Guinea through a line of credit. While doing so, the price of gold decreased, leading Vengold to have more debt than equity.

As Telfer recalls, seeing that the end was near for Vengold, on September 29, 1999, gold experienced a brief uptick in price. Taking advantage of the brief window, Telfer sold all the shares of Vengold to pay off the banks, leaving him and his shareholders with a shell company with $30 million to its name.

As Telfer describes, at the time, dot-com companies were the "flavour of the moment" and for the sake of investors, Telfer morphed this shell company into a dot-com venture called Itemus Inc., an Internet incubator.

Itemus stock ran up from $0.06 to $5 and some investors did make money. However, lacking a sustainable revenue source, Itemus filed for bankruptcy in 2001.

=== Wheaton River Minerals Inc. ===
After a five-year lull, in 2002, the price of gold began to see a rebound. In 2001, Telfer was approached by mining financier, Frank Giustra. At the time, gold was still trading at a low $300 an ounce level. Together, Telfer and Giustra discussed plans of re-entering the gold market and finding an appropriate investment vehicle to do so. Giustra pinpointed Wheaton River Minerals, which at the time was a shell company with $5 to $10 million and 6 employees.

Telfer and Giustra raised the capital to buy into Wheaton River, and in October 2001, Telfer became Wheaton River's chief executive officer. By December of the same year, with gold prices rebounding, Telfer began looking for gold assets to acquire and first acquired the Luismin mine in Mexico for roughly $75 million in April 2002. Over the next three years, buoyed by a gold bull market, Telfer led Wheaton River in acquiring several other gold mines. In a three-year span, Telfer guided Wheaton River from a roughly $10 million company to one with an approximately $2.4 billion valuation.

=== Goldcorp Inc. ===
In 2004, Wheaton River Minerals announced plans of merging with IamGold Corp. When IamGold shareholders rejected the merger, it left the door open for a different merger.

In 2004, Wheaton River merged with established Goldcorp Inc. in a $2.4-billion share swap that saw Goldcorp absorbing Wheaton River. Following the merger, Goldcorp's board of directors appointed Telfer as Goldcorp's new chief executive officer. In 2006, Telfer led in Goldcorp's friendly acquisition of Glamis Gold, a merger that at the time created the world's third largest gold mining company. The new, larger company retained the Goldcorp name. The merger also shifted Telfer from chief executive officer of Goldcorp to the company's chairman.

=== Silver Wheaton Corp. ===
In April 2005, Wheaton River Minerals faced a hostile bid for its silver assets by Coeur Mining Inc., then called Coeur d’Alene Mines. Rather than accepting the hostile bid, Telfer led in separating off Wheaton River Minerals’ silver assets into a new company to be called Silver Wheaton Corp. Telfer was also instrumental in brainstorming the concept behind Silver Wheaton, which is a mining company that does not do any mining itself, but instead acquires silver byproduct from other mining companies that are focused on other precious metals.

In April 2006, Telfer stepped down from his role as director of Silver Wheaton Corp.

=== Other companies ===
In addition to his work with Wheaton River Minerals and Goldcorp, Telfer has founded and led other mining companies. In 2006, Telfer and Frank Giustra formed UrAsia Energy, a uranium producer operating a mine in Kazakhstan. Telfer served as UrAsia's chairman. In 2007, UrAsia merged with Uranium One Inc., with Telfer continuing on as Uranium One's chairman.

Telfer contributed in launching Terrane Minerals, Tahoe Resources, Peak Gold and Primero Mining.

Telfer is also the co-founder of Renaissance Oil Corp., an oil company currently developing shale and oil fields in Mexico. Telfer launched Renaissance Oil after Mexico began privatizing its oil and gas industry.

=== World Gold Council ===
Ian Telfer served as Chairman of the World Gold Council (WGC) from 2009 to 2013.

== Charitable work ==
Over the years, Ian Telfer has contributed to a number of philanthropic causes. In a 2011 interview, Telfer commented that because personal wealth came to him relatively late in life, it has allowed him to think beyond his own personal gain and place a higher value in philanthropic endeavors.

Telfer has been a supporter of the Lions Gate Hospital Foundation and the Vancouver Playhouse. Telfer and his wife donated $1 million to West Vancouver's Collingwood School between 2009 and 2013. Telfer has also been a supporter of The Princess Margaret Cancer Foundation, donating $500,000 to the foundation in 2014.

In 2008, Telfer pledged $3 million to the Clinton Giustra Sustainable Growth Initiative.

=== University of Ottawa's Telfer School of Management ===
In 2007, Telfer donated $25 million to the University of Ottawa's School of Management, which at the time was the largest donation ever given to the University of Ottawa. It was also believed to be at the time the largest single gift ever given to a Canadian business school. Following Telfer's donation to the school, the University of Ottawa's School of Management was renamed the Telfer School of Management.

In addition to this donation, Telfer established a scholarship at the Telfer School of Management awarded each year to the MBA student accepted to the school with the lowest grades.

In 2015, Telfer donated another $2 million to the Telfer School of Management.

== Recognition ==
Telfer has been the recipient of various awards and accolades during his professional career. In 2013, Telfer was listed in Canadian Business Magazine's "The Power 50". Telfer was awarded Ernst & Young's 2007 Western Canada Entrepreneur of the year. In 2015, Telfer was inducted into the Canadian Mining Hall of Fame. That same year, Telfer was awarded an honorary doctorate by the University of Ottawa.

In 2015, the philanthropic contributions of Telfer and his wife were recognized at the "10th Annual Global Forum on Human Settlements" held at the Headquarters of the United Nations In New York.

In 2016, Telfer was inducted into the Business Laureates of British Columbia Telfer has also been the recipient of the Murray Pezim Award presented by The Association for Mineral Exploration.

Telfer often speaks on lessons he has learned during his career and has emphasized the importance of taking advantage of an opportunity when it presents itself.

== Personal life ==
Telfer is married and has two children.
