= Thomas d'Aquino =

Canadian entrepreneur, lawyer, philanthropist, businessperson (born 1940)

Thomas Paul d'Aquino CM
- Born: 1940 (age 85–86); Trail British Columbia, Canada
- Education: University of British Columbia, London School of Economics
- Occupation: Businessperson
- Board member of: National Gallery of Canada Foundation. Chair
- Awards: member of the Order of Canada
- Website: https://thomasdaquino.ca

Thomas Paul d'Aquino CM is a Canadian entrepreneur, lawyer, philanthropist, businessperson, author, and educator. His business career spans over forty years, and he is currently the chairman of Thomas d'Aquino Capital and Inter counsel. From 1981 to 2009 he served as CEO of the Business Council of Canada, formerly the Canadian Council of Chief Executives, and is the long-serving chair of the National Gallery of Canada foundation. In 2019 he was made a member of the Order of Canada.

== Biography ==
d'Aquino was born in British Columbia, Canada. He attended the University of British Columbia, Queen's, and the London School of Economics.

Early in his career, he served as Special assistant to the Prime Minister and was an adjunct professor of law at the University of Ottawa. In 1976 d'Aquino started his own business and won strategic consulting mandates from major companies around the world. From 1981 to 2009, he served as the CEO of the Business Council of Canada, a group consisting of 150 CEOs of Canada's leading enterprises. He is currently the chairman of Thomas d'Aquino Capital and Intercounsel.

d'Aquino is the chair emeritus of the National Gallery of Canada Foundation, and has served in this position since 2002.

He has authored numerous publications including Northern Edge: How Canadians Can Triumph in the Global Economy and most recently Private Power, Public Purpose.

d'Aquino has spoken in forty countries and over 100 cities worldwide and has been referred to as Canada's "most influential policy strategist" and its "leading global business ambassador." In 2009 d'Aquino was described by John Lorinc of The Globe and Mail as Canada's "behind-the-scenes prime minister" and the "most influential corporate tout" for almost 30 years. D'Aquino was listed among the top 100 most influential people in Canada in the 20th century.

== Awards and honours ==
Thomas d'Aquino has received numerous awards and honours for his decades of service. He is a member of the Order of Canada, the Order of Ottawa and a recipient of the Queen Elizabeth II Golden and Diamond Jubilee medals. The Italian president named him a knight commander, and he was awarded Mexico's highest foreign honour: the Order of the Aztec Eagle.. He holds three honorary degrees from Queen's, Wilfrid Laurier, and Western university.
