= Evelyn Myrie =

Canadian activist

Evelyn Myrie (born 1959) is a Canadian community activist, particularly in the area of anti-Black racism, in Hamilton, Ontario. She is known for her community leadership, activism, anti-racism work. The Evelyn Myrie Award for Political Action was created in her honour. Myrie has received numerous awards and distinctions in recognition of her important contributions to equity work in Hamilton and in Canada, including the Queen Elizabeth II Golden Jubilee Award, Government of Canada, Queen Elizabeth II Diamond Jubilee Award, Government of Canada, the Woman of the Year Public Affairs Award from the City of Hamilton, and was the inaugural inductee into the City of Hamilton's Order of Hamilton award.

== Life and work ==
Evelyn Myrie was born 1959 in Jamaica. She emigrated to Canada in 1974 with her five sisters to live with their mother in Windsor, Ontario. Myrie has held numerous leadership roles in government, the non-profit and private sector. She is known for her community leadership, activism, anti-racism work and as a freelance columnist. Myrie was described as an "anti-discrimination trailblazer" by The Hamilton Spectator. and is featured in 100 Accomplished Black Canadian Women, a book which celebrates achievements of the women and their paths to success.

Myrie notes that her interest in working on social justice and equality began after university when she worked at the Windsor Women Working for Immigrant Women. The organization exposed her to the unfortunate realities and limited rights facing live-in domestic foreign workers. In 1989 she moved to Hamilton to take a position with the Status of Women Canada. Since that time Myrie has been an active figure in the community, participating in committees and leading organizations. Myrie co-founded the John C. Holland Awards with Marlene Thomas in 1996. The awards "celebrate the rich cultural heritage of the community with particular focus on the contributions of African Canadians to the social economic, and cultural life of our entire city". In 2015 she founded the Women Who Rock Awards to celebrate Women's History Month.

Currently the president of the Hamilton Afro-Canadian Caribbean Association and CEO of the EMpower Strategy Group, Myrie was announced in the fall of 2020 to lead the creation of an advisory panel that would guide the restarting of the Hamilton Anti-Racism Resource Centre, the final report and proposal for revamped operations was presented and accepted by Hamilton City Council on February 18, 2021.

Myrie ran for the office of Ward 1 councillor in the 1994 Hamilton, Ontario Municipal Election, capturing 13.6% of the vote and losing to newcomer Marvin Caplan. In 2003, she sought the nomination for Provincial NDP nomination in Hamilton West. In 2016 the John C. Holland Awards created the Evelyn Myrie Award for Political Action in her honour and the bursary is given to an individual who has shown leadership in political action within the community. Along with her political activism and social justice work, Myrie ran Eman Fine Art Prints & Tings, a gallery of African art and the art of those of African descent, it operated online and had a storefront on Locke Street. She started the gallery because of notable lack of stores that reflected diverse culture in Hamilton. Myrie is an avid long-distance runner and has participated in numerous marathons throughout the years.

== Career and volunteer work ==
- Program Director at Status of Women Canada
- Founding Director of Peel Newcomer Strategy Group
- Executive Director of the Hamilton Centre for Civic Inclusion
- Freelance columnist The Hamilton Spectator
- Founder and Principal EmPower Strategy Group
- Host of television show Singing Her Praises on Cable 14 Hamilton
- Past-Chair African Canadian Legal Clinic Toronto
- Founding member and chairperson Hamilton Black History Committee
- Organizer TEDxKingStreetWomen
- Honorary Board Member 2021 - South Asian Heritage Association of Hamilton Region
- SETSI Advisory Group Member - Social Economy through Social Inclusion

== Honours, decorations, awards and distinctions ==
- 10 Year Volunteer Award (for Black History Committee), Ministry of Citizenship and Immigration, Ontario
- Queen Elizabeth II Golden Jubilee Award, Government of Canada
- Queen Elizabeth II Diamond Jubilee Award, Government of Canada
- Portrait of Success Award, The Hamilton Spectator
- Woman of the Year Public Affairs Award, City of Hamilton
- Inductee Hamiltons Gallery of Distinction 2011
- 100 Accomplished Black Canadian Women 2016
- Order of Hamilton 2019 Inaugural Inductee
