= Sean Wise =

Canadian businessman

- Education: Carleton University; University of Ottawa; University of Glasgow
- Occupation: University professor

Sean Wise (born September 23, 1970) is a Canadian mentor capitalist (mentor to young firms), international business speaker, business columnist for The Globe and Mail, author, partner at Ryerson Futures Inc, and as a consultant for CBC on the venture reality show Dragons' Den.

== Career ==
Sean Wise is a graduate of Carleton University where he studied Aerospace Engineering and Economics. After his undergraduate degree Wise went on to get his law degree and his MBA from the University of Ottawa, and has completed his PhD in Business from the Adam Smith Business School at the University of Glasgow. Wise’s career has led him to be a lawyer, a member of the Upper Canada Law Society, an ambassador for the Toronto Stock Exchange, chair of the Canadian Venture Forum (selection committee), and currently chair of the boards of directors of several venture capital-backed and publicly traded companies in Canada. Wise was formerly a director at Ernst and Young where he helped found their Canadian "Venture Capital Advisory Group".

Wise is the host of The Naked Entrepreneur, his own blog-podcast-vodcast, a professor at Toronto Metropolitan University (formerly Ryerson University) and a mentor to many young startups. As a university professor Wise is concerned with educating students and helping them change the world and realize their dreams. Sean Wise is also a partner at Ryerson Futures, a "Founders First" Accelerator program, partnered and working with The Digital Media Zone at Toronto Metropolitan University. He also sits as an Advisor for TMU’s DMZ and does pitch sessions and workshops for the more than 125 companies currently incubated in the space.

== Writing ==
Sean Wise has written over five books and one graphic novel called Penance. The first of his books Wise Words: Lessons in Entrepreneurship & Venture Capital was self-published in 2007. His second, How to be a Business Superhero was published in September, 2008 by Penguin and Hot or Not: How to Know If Your Business Idea Will Fly or Fail was published in 2011. Sean Wise’s most recent book Startup Opportunities: Know When to Quit Your Day Job was written with co-author Brad Feld and published in March 2015. Startup Opportunities was written as a precursor to The Lean Startup and is meant to help entrepreneurs figure out whether or not their opportunity is really worth quitting their day job to pursue. The book was featured in the Financial Post stating that the book "could have a massive impact on the way entrepreneurs do their thing." Sean has also written for The Huffington Post as a professor investor giving aspiring entrepreneurs advice and hope for the future of their statups.

Sean Wise was published in the Spring 2008 issue of The Journal of Private Equity. While this was his first academic article, he has produced several other publications therein. Sean Wise’s most cited work is titled "Value co‐creation through collective intelligence in the public sector: A review of US and European initiatives" which reviews the 2012 public sector initiatives launched by the American federal government and the European Union. Sean Wise has also written for The Globe and Mail talking about his business concept the Talent triangle that explains the three must needs for a successful management team. Sean was also featured in many other Canadian Newspapers including The Toronto Star, Global News, and the Financial Post talking about business and entrepreneurship.

== The Naked Entrepreneur ==
Sean Wise produces Canadian entrepreneurship content as the creator and host of The Naked Entrepreneur TV, a web-based series devoted to entrepreneurship and filmed at Ryerson University, in collaboration between the Ted Rogers School of Management and the RTA School of Media. The series unearths the entrepreneurial stories and struggles of those involved in the process and interviews several renowned Canadian entrepreneurs including Debbie Travis, W. Brett Wilson and Jon Sleeman. The series has filmed four seasons and made its TV broadcast premier on Rogers TV Toronto on October 28, 2014. On February 1, 2015, The Naked Entrepreneur launched on the Oprah Winfrey Network (Canadian TV channel)5. The series can also be found on Apple’s iTunes Podcast

Season 4 of The Naked Entrepreneur premiers Fall 2015 on the Oprah Winfrey Network (Canadian TV channel) with notable guests like Gene Simmons of KISS, Dan Martell of Clarity, Bruce Croxon founder of Lavalife, Susur Lee celebrated chef, Ariel Garten of Muse the brain sensing headband, and more.

== Awards ==
In April 2014, Sean Wise was recognized as Central Canada’s Mentor of the Year, and went on to win the National Mentor of the Year Award with the inaugural Startup Canada Awards. "These Awards celebrate the people and organizations dedicated to building a strong ecosystem in support of high-impact and high-growth businesses in Canada" – Dr. Sorin Cohn, the Chair of the Adjudication Committee. Before being named Mentor of the Year Sean Wise was an active mentor for many young firms and speaks strongly on how mentors can help a firm survive.
