= Henry Shi =

Businessperson

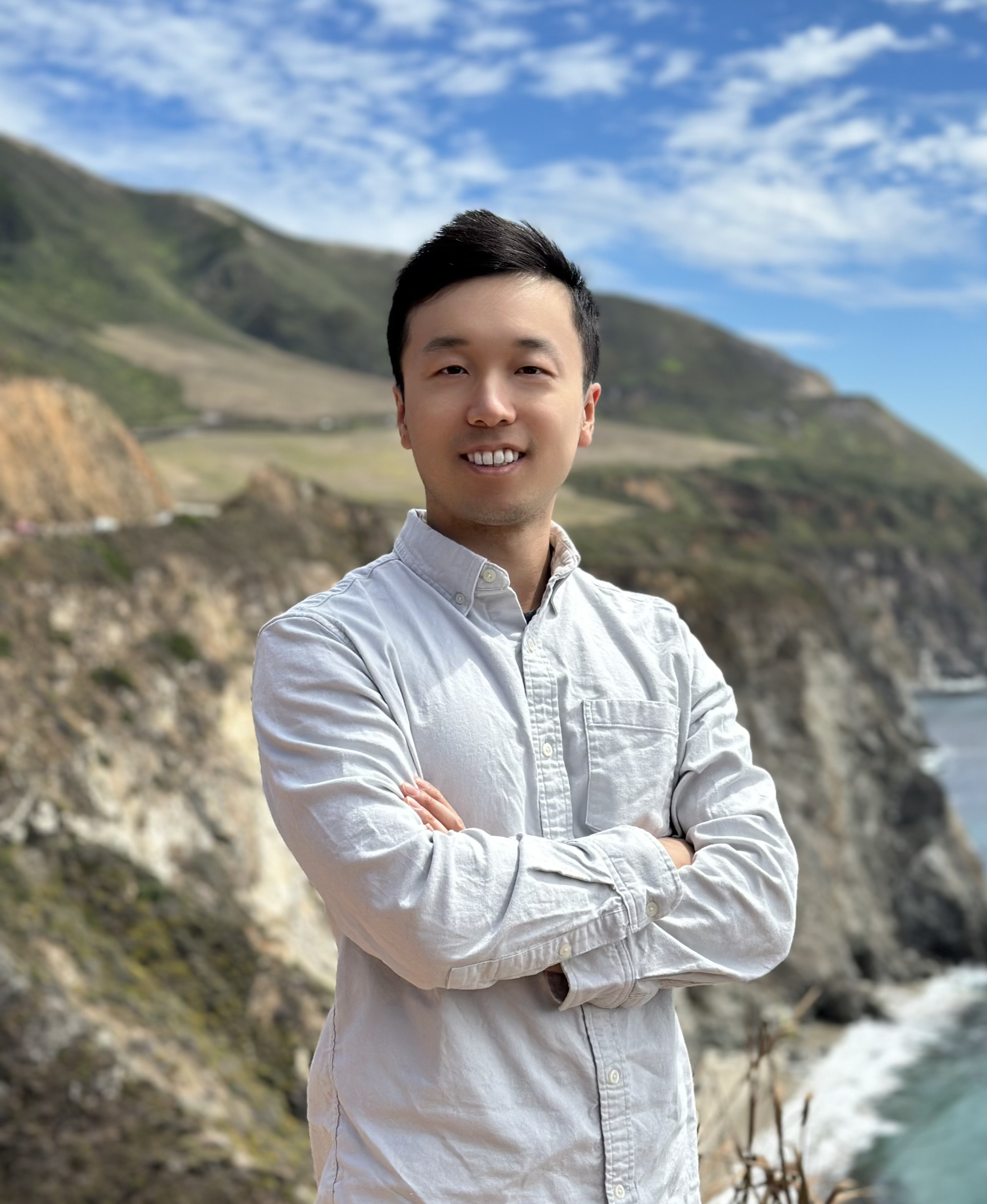
- Education: Georgia Tech, University of Waterloo
- Occupation: Entrepreneur
- Years active: 2011-present
- Organization: Super.com
- Board member of: Georgia Institute of Technology College of Computing

Henry Shi is a technology entrepreneur based in San Francisco, California. He co-founded Super.com (formerly Snapcommerce) in April 2016, and served as the CTO and COO. Shi currently works at Anthropic as a chief technology advisor.

== Early life and education ==
Shi graduated from the University of Waterloo. He was also admitted to the Stanford Graduate School of Business. In 2016, he joined Georgia Tech's OMSCS and now serves on the advisory board of the College of Computing. Shi was also given the Rising Stars award by Georgia Tech in May 2023. While at Waterloo, he was also accepted into The Next 36 program.

== Career ==
Before co-founding Super.com, Shi held engineering roles at Bloomberg, Scotia Capital and Google during 2011-2012.

During his term at Google in 2014, he built and launched 'Music Insights' for YouTube.

=== Super.com ===
Launched in 2016 as Snapcommerce by Hussein Fazal and Shi, Super.com is a savings and earnings application with fintech, rewards and travel use cases. Fazal leads Super.com as CEO along with Shi as COO and CTO. The company has grown to over 200 employees and $150M in revenue annually. In 2024, Super.com was named one of America's 45th fastest growing companies by Financial Times. Shi has been an Angel and Seed investor in various AI startups.

== Awards and recognition ==
- Forbes 30 under 30, 2019
- EY Entrepreneur of the Year Ontario, 2022
