= Pythian Group =

American and Canadian multinational corporation

Pythian
- Type: Private company
- Industry: IT services, IT consulting
- Founded: 1997
- Headquarters: Ottawa, Ontario, Canada
- Area served: Worldwide
- Services: IT Services; IT Consulting; Managed services
- Number of employees: 500+
- Website: pythian.com

Pythian Services Inc, commonly known as Pythian, is an American and Canadian multinational corporation that provides data and cloud-related services. Pythian Services provides services for Oracle, SQL Server, MySQL, Hadoop, Cassandra and other databases, including services for their supporting infrastructure. It also provides transformation services, that include cloud migration services, cloud managed services and analytics data platform design and management products and services. Pythian has partnerships with major public cloud vendors including Amazon, Google and Microsoft.

== History ==
The company is based in Ottawa, Ontario, and has offices in New York City, London, and Hyderabad, India.

Founded by Paul Vallée in 1997, the company employs approximately 400 employees. In 2014 they acquired Blackbird.io, which was formerly PalominoDB and DriveDev. In 2019 Pythian was acquired by Mill Point Capital, a middle-market private equity firm focused on control-oriented investments in North American IT services, business services, and industrial companies.

== Products and services ==
Pythian is the creator of Adminiscope, a privileged access-management and supervision product.

Blackbird is a wholly owned subsidiary of The Pythian Group, following its acquisition in 2014. The DevOps and data services provider acquisition made Pythian one of the largest open-sourced database and managed-service companies globally.

In 2018, Pythian announced Tehama, a SaaS product. The software was made to manage third-party vendors and freelancers. It targets common problems such as mailing laptops or monitoring work activity. The SaaS product was formed as a subsidiary startup of The Pythian Group.

In 2019, Pythian Services was acquired by NYC based private equity firm Mill Point Capital. In 2020, Pythian purchased Agosto, a Minneapolis-based Google Cloud reseller and IT service management company specializing in IoT. In 2021, Pythian acquired ManageServe, a Chicago-based SAP managed & professional services company.

== Awards and recognition ==
Pythian was listed in Canada's Top Small and Medium Employers of 2015. In 2013 and 2014 they received the Global Outsourcing 100 Rising Star by the International Association of Outsourcing Professionals.

Pythian was ranked 91st on the Branham Group Inc's list of 2015 Top 250 Canadian ICT Companies.

Pythian received the 2018 Google Cloud Global Data Analytics Partner of the Year award.
