= Harley Finkelstein =

Canadian entrepreneur and public speaker

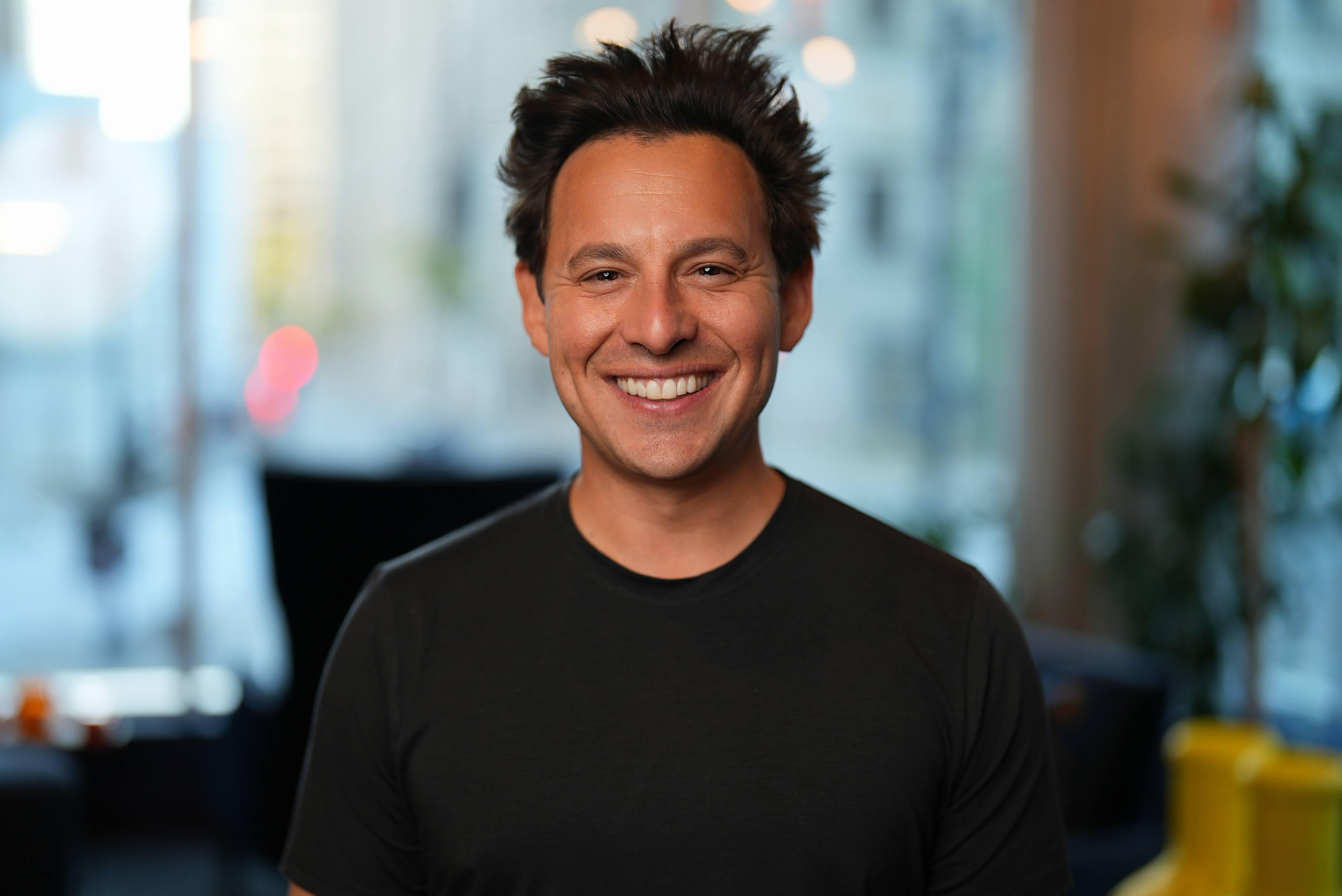
- Born: November 8, 1983 (age 43); Montreal, Quebec, Canada
- Education: McGill University, Concordia University, University of Ottawa
- Occupation: President of Shopify
- Spouse: Lindsay Taub
- Children: 2
- Website: harleyf.com

Harley Finkelstein (born November 8, 1983) is a Canadian businessman, entrepreneur and public speaker. He is best known as the president of Shopify. He was a board member of the CBC from 2017 to 2020, and an advisor to both OMERS Ventures and Felicis Ventures. He is also a Dragon on CBC Dragons' Den, Next Gen Den.

== Early life and education ==
Finkelstein was born in Montreal, Quebec, Canada. At 17, he founded a T-shirt company while attending McGill University. He later transferred to Concordia University and received a bachelor's degree in economics. Finkelstein then attended the University of Ottawa where he founded the JD/MBA Student Society and the Canadian MBA Oath while working towards his Juris Doctor and MBA.

== Career ==
After completing his JD and MBA, Finkelstein worked at a law firm in Toronto for a year. In 2009, Finkelstein met with Tobias Lütke, the co-founder and CEO of Shopify, to discuss opportunities for the company, and became one of the first merchants on Shopify. Finkelstein was hired soon after and was named Shopify's Chief Platform Officer. In December 2014, Finkelstein was appointed a member of the C100 board. The C100 is an organization that supports the Canadian technology community and is a bridge between Canada and Silicon Valley. Finkelstein serves as a mentor and advisor to various organizations and incubators including Felicis Ventures, FounderFuel, Invest Ottawa and CIPPIC.

In January 2016, Finkelstein was named COO of Shopify. That same year, he was inducted into the Order of Ottawa by Mayor Jim Watson.

In December 2017, Finkelstein joined the board of directors for CBC.

In September 2020, Finkelstein was appointed Shopify President.

=== Other activities ===
In November 2021, Finkelstein and DavidsTea's cofounder David Segal launched an e-commerce tea retailer called Firebelly Tea. The duo also started a podcast titled Big Shot in 2023.

=== Awards ===
Finkelstein was named Angel investor of the Year at the Canadian Startup Awards in March 2017.

In 2017 Finkelstein was awarded Canada’s Top 40 Under 40.

Finkelstein received the King Charles III Coronation Medal in 2025.

== Personal life and philanthropy ==
Finkelstein is Jewish and is the grandson of Holocaust survivors. He is married to Lindsay Taub, a psychotherapist and entrepreneur, and they have two daughters. The four of them live in Montreal. In 2018 it was announced that Finkelstein was donating $2,000,000 to establish the new Finkelstein Chabad Jewish Centre in the Sandy Hill neighbourhood of Ottawa. After attending the Chabad centre when he was a student at the University of Ottawa and realizing that there was not enough room to fit all the students who wished to attend events, he promised the Rabbi he would donate to pay him back for the generosity of his family in welcoming Jewish students in Ottawa.

Finkelstein has spoken about, and uses the concept of Ikigai.
