= Monarchy in the Canadian provinces =

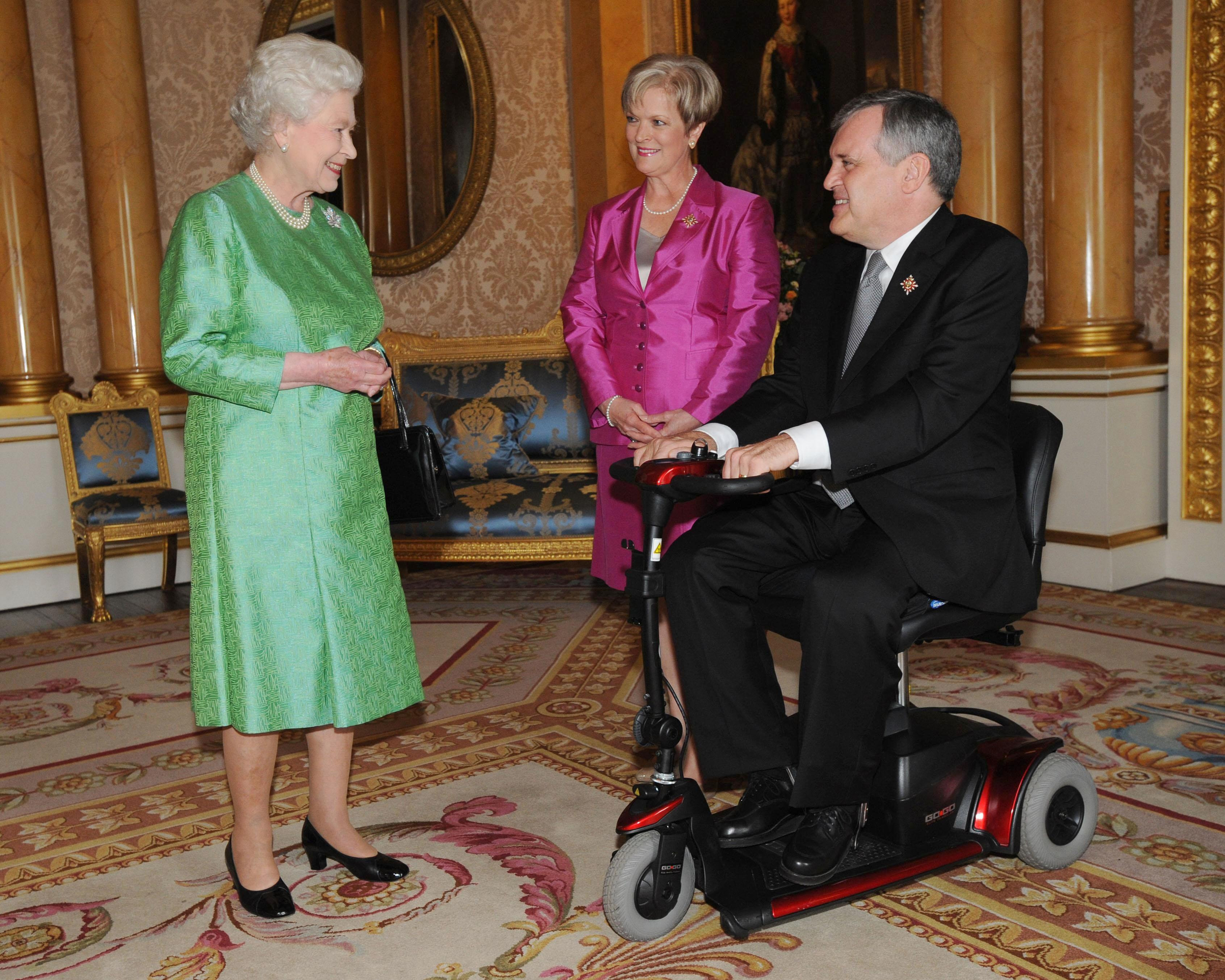
Lieutenant Governor of Ontario David Onley and his wife meet with Queen Elizabeth II before an audience with the monarch at Buckingham Palace, 2008

The monarchy of Canada forms the core of each Canadian provincial jurisdiction's Westminster-style parliamentary democracy, being the foundation of the executive, legislative, and judicial branches of government in each province. The monarch since 8 September 2022 is King Charles III, who as sovereign is shared equally with both the Commonwealth realms and the Canadian federal entity. He, his consort, and other members of the Canadian royal family undertake various public and private functions across the country. He is the only member of the royal family with any constitutional role.

Royal assent and the royal sign-manual are required to enact laws, letters patent, and Orders in Council. The Constitution Act, 1867, leaves the monarch's direct role in the provinces in question and many royal duties in these regions are specifically assigned to the sovereign's provincial viceroys, known as lieutenant governors, who are appointed by the King's federal representative, the governor general. Further, within the conventional stipulations of constitutional monarchy, the Crown's direct participation in any of these areas of governance is limited, with most related powers entrusted for exercise by the elected parliamentarians, the appointed ministers of the Crown generally drawn from amongst them, and the judges and justices of the peace. The Crown today primarily functions as a guarantor of continuous and stable governance and a nonpartisan safeguard against the abuse of power, the sovereign acting as a custodian of the Crown's democratic powers and representing the "power of the people above government and political parties."

In all provinces, the monarchy's roots lie in the British Crown, while in some, mostly in Eastern Canada, the French Crown also had influence. Over the centuries, the institution throughout the country has evolved to become a distinctly Canadian one, represented by unique symbols for each province.

== Federal and provincial aspects ==
The Canadian monarchy is a unitary institution over all eleven of Canada's governmental spheres (one federal and ten provincial); the monarch reigns impartially over the nation as a whole, with the headship of state neither federal nor provincial jurisdiction. At the same time, the one Crown operates separately within each area of governance; it is so central a part of the various governments that any constitutional amendment that affects the monarchy in any or all of them requires the unanimous consent of all the provincial legislatures, along with the federal parliament, rather than the two-thirds majority necessary for most other amendments. There is one monarch, who "acts in different rights". Such is demonstrated when the sovereign takes on different legal personas in a case wherein a provincial government files a lawsuit against the federal or another provincial government. Also, as it was put in Attorney-General of Canada v. Higbie: "When the Crown, in right of the Province, transfers land to the Crown, in right of the Dominion, it parts with no right. What takes place is merely a change of administrative control." The Canadian Crown thus both remains above and links together all of the jurisdictions in Confederation; (Note: Of this, Eugene Forsey wrote in Crown and Cabinet: "The first thing to get clear is that the provinces are not themselves 'monarchies.' They are a part of a constitutional monarchy, Canada. The Queen is Queen of Canada, not Queen of Ontario, Queen of Quebec, Queen of British Columbia, etc. She is, of course, queen in all these provinces. But she is 'Queen of Canada,' and it is as such that she is queen in each of the provinces.") it has been described as a "divided crown," or a "compound monarchy".

The arrangement provides that each of Canada's provinces are all sovereign of each other and the federal realm. The sovereignty of the provinces is passed on not by the governor general or federal parliament, but through the overreaching Crown itself to the monarch's viceregal representatives in the provinces, the lieutenant governors, and the limitation that they act, in the monarch's name, only on the advice of the relevant provincial ministers of the Crown or legislature. The Supreme Court found in 1918 that provincial legislation cannot bind the federal Crown except "by express terms or necessary intendment", nor can the monarch in his federal council or parliament legislate for the provinces beyond the provisions of the constitution. The provincial Crown "exists to safeguard the independence of each province".

Since the Queen transcends and encompasses both the central and provincial governments, the Canadian headship of state is not a creature of either jurisdiction. Through the offices of the Governor General and Lieutenant Governor, the Queen reigns impartially over Confederation as a whole.

— Dr. Michael D. Jackson LVO CD

The system was set up as such by the Fathers of Confederation because they saw such a use of constitutional monarchy as a bulwark against any fracturing of the Canadian federation. In 1939, Sir Shuldham Redfern, then Secretary to the Governor General, said that, without a common allegiance to the Crown, the regions of Canada might break up. The British North America Act, 1867 (now the Constitution Act, 1867), was written so as to reflect the view of John A. Macdonald and the Earl of Derby that the provinces were subordinate to the federal Crown, with the lieutenant governors appointed by the governor general and not—as is done with the governors of the Australian states and was suggested be integrated in Canada by the 1979 Task Force on National Unity—by the Queen herself. Further, while the lieutenant governors did each hold a great seal, summoned and prorogued parliament in the Queen's stead, and granted royal assent to bills that bore the Queen's name, it was still expected that the latter be given in the name of the governor general.

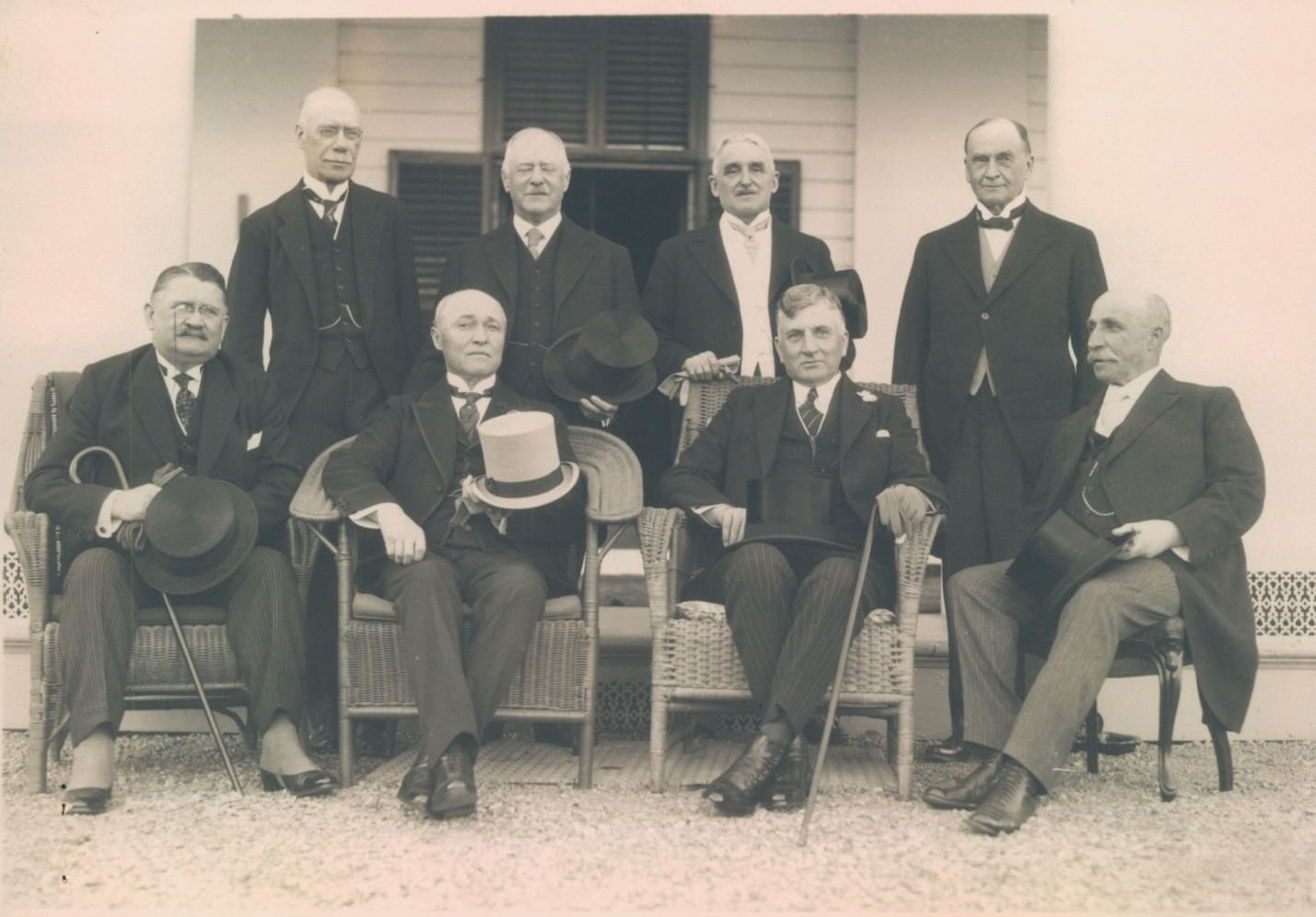
A meeting of Canada's lieutenant governors in September 1925; standing, from left to right: Henry William Newlands, Walter Cameron Nichol, Frank Richard Heartz, James Albert Manning Aikins; seated, left to right: James Robson Douglas, Narcisse Pérodeau, Henry Cockshutt, William Frederick Todd

That rule was never followed in Ontario and Quebec, though, and the other provinces soon followed suit. Then, in 1882, the legitimacy of the lieutenant governors as direct representatives of the monarch was established by the Lord Watson of the Judicial Committee of the Privy Council in the case of Maritime Bank v. Receiver-General of New Brunswick. In his ruling, which discovered a provincial guise of the Crown and thus further empowered the provinces, Watson stated, "the Lieutenant Governor [...] is as much a representative of Her Majesty, for all purposes of provincial government, as the Governor General himself is, for all purposes of Dominion government." This was further confirmed with the Referendum Act, 1919 and the Judicial Committee found in 1932 that there was a definite separation between the provincial and federal treasuries; "it is true there is only one Crown, but, as regards Crown revenues and Crown property by legislation assented to by the Crown, there is a distinction to be made between the property in the province and the revenues and property in the Dominion. There are two purses." The Lord Denning of the Court of Appeal of England and Wales ruled in 1982 that "the Crown became separate and divisible, according to the particular territory in which it was sovereign... It was separate and divisible for each self-governing Dominion or province or territory."

The Crown became the foundation of "the federative principle in Canada." The lieutenant governors' equal status to the governor general is crucial to provincial co-sovereignty and federalism, (Note: Former Lieutenant Governor of Newfoundland and Labrador Edward Roberts expressed his opinion that: "There is a common misconception that Lieutenant Governors are somehow subordinate to the Governor General in the constitutional sense. That is not correct. Each is the Queen's personal representative and the institutional embodiment of the Crown.") (Note: Jacques Monet later stated in his book The Canadian Crown: "The adaptation of the Crown to a federal system was a unique and daring experiment. But it works. The sovereignty of the same Crown is exercised by different representatives in different jurisdictions. Thus, diversity has been reconciled to unity.") the monarchy having been said to provide flexibility to the Canadian federation and thus be a factor in its sustainability. Indeed, provincial premiers have used the monarchy to the advantage of their respective provinces, recognising that "the Crown has been the engine or propeller of expanded provincial constitutional authority in the shifting balance of power within the Canadian confederation." David Smith opined that, by being separated from the monarch by two levels of viceregal representation, the Canadian populace has been made more accepting of the Crown's role in determining who will govern in a minority parliament situation, while Canadian republican leader Tom Freda opposes the system, calling the lieutenant governors "redundant and obsolete", as does Parti Québécois leader Pauline Marois, who opined that the Lieutenant Governor of Quebec is a "waste of money".

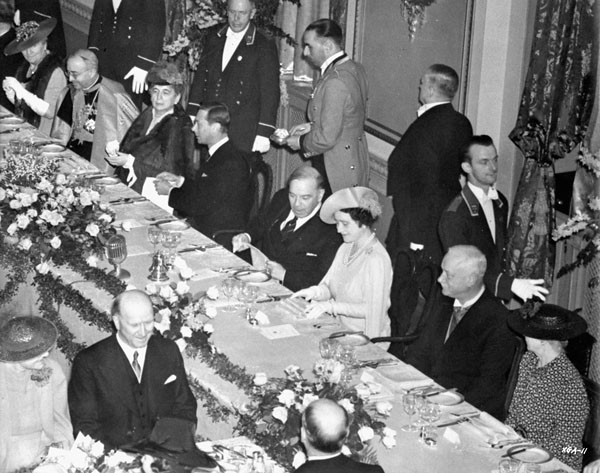
King George VI (fourth from left) and Queen Elizabeth (third from right) with Canadian Prime Minister William Lyon Mackenzie King (fifth from left) and Lieutenant Governor of Quebec Esioff-Léon Patenaude (second from right) at the Château Frontenac in Quebec City, 1939

Today, though they continue to be appointed and dismissed by the governor general and only the federal parliament may initiate constitutional changes to their role, (Note: Since 1867, the governor general has dismissed two lieutenant governors before their traditional time in office had expired.) the lieutenant governors are now considered to be direct representatives of the sovereign, which has accorded them the right to receive audience with the monarch; a practice begun by the Lieutenant Governor of Alberta in 1956. They are also still only accorded the style of His/Her Honour, which is inferior to the governor general's style of His/Her Excellency, and may receive only a 15-gun salute, as opposed to the 21-gun salute given to the federal viceroy. The relationship between all the governments has been facilitated since 1970 by triennial meetings of the eleven viceroys (and now the three territorial commissioners as well), hosted each time by a different lieutenant governor in their province, though the chairperson is always the governor general.

=== Finances ===
Funding of the Crown's operation in the provinces is split between the federal and provincial governments. As the viceroy is a federal appointee, the federal Crown pays in two parts—In Capital City Expenses and Out of Capital City Expenses—for some of the lieutenant governors' costs of office; his or her salary, which, like the governor general's, is fully taxed; and, through the Department of Canadian Heritage, a superannuation to retired lieutenant governors, though this money is actually garnished off of the individual's salary during his or her time in office. The provincial coffers supply the relevant lieutenant governor for other expenses of office, travel costs, and the upkeep of official residences, amongst other necessities. There is no uniform way in which each province distributes the money, and the amounts will also vary, depending on the facilities available to the monarch's representative, how they are used, which departments support them, and how they expenditures are listed in the provincial estimates.

The sovereign and other members of the royal family are only supported by tax dollars in the performance of their official duties. Should a province be hosting events that involve royal participation, the costs are also split between the federal and provincial spheres—the provincial Crown may pay for accommodation and transport, while the federal Crown supplies funds for Royal Canadian Mounted Police security and other household staff. Residents of the provinces do not pay any money to the royals, either as personal income or to support royal residences outside of the province.

== Personification of the state ==
The sovereign is regarded as the personification, or legal personality, of each of the provincial states, (Note: See note 11 at Monarchy of Canada.) with the state therefore referred to as The Crown in Right of [Province], His Majesty in Right of [Province], or The King in Right of [Province]. (Note: See note 9 at Monarchy of Canada.) As such, the monarch is the employer of all provincial government staff (including the viceroys, judges, police officers, and members of the legislative assemblies), (Note: See note 13 at Monarchy of Canada.) the guardian of foster children (Crown wards), as well as the owner of all state lands (Crown land), buildings and equipment (Crown-held property), state-owned companies (Crown Corporations), and the copyright for all government publications (Crown copyright). This is all in his position as sovereign, and not as an individual; all such property is inherited by each successive sovereign as possession of the Crown in right of the province in perpetuity and it cannot be sold by the sovereign without the lieutenant governor doing so with the proper advice and consent of their ministers.

As the embodiment of the state, the monarch is at the head of all provincial orders of precedence, and is also the locus of the Oath of Allegiance, (Note: See note 14 at Monarchy of Canada.) (Note: The Members' Manual of the National Assembly outlines that the oath is to Canada via the Queen, though some have viewed the Queen as representative of the provincial state and not of Canada in a provincial context.) which is constitutionally required of members of the legislative assemblies and of the recruits of some provincial police forces, per statute law. This is done in reciprocation to the sovereign's Coronation Oath, wherein he or she promises "to govern the Peoples of... Canada... according to their respective laws and customs." There was in the 1970s some opposition to the oath by Parti Québécois members of the National Assembly of Quebec, where an additional oath to the people of Quebec has been added.

== Constitutional role ==
The operation of the Crown in the Canadian provinces is very similar to its function in the federal jurisdiction, wherein the role of the monarch is both legal and practical, and the Crown is regarded as a corporation, with the sovereign, vested as he is with all powers of state, as the centre of a constitutional construct in which several parts—the institutions of government acting under the sovereign's authority—share the power of the whole. Unlike with the federal Crown, the monarch personally has little direct involvement with the provinces, the exercise of the royal prerogative delegated entirely to the lieutenant governors, who are appointed by the governor general on the advice of the prime minister of Canada, though usually in consultation with the relevant provincial premier, and the monarch is informed of the prime minister's decision before the governor general gives the viceregal sign-manual and affixes the Great Seal of Canada to the commission. The sovereign may still hold audience with the provincial premiers.

=== Executive ===
A provincial government is defined by the Constitution Act, 1867, as the lieutenant governor acting on the advice of the executive council, what is technically known as the Lieutenant-Governor-in-Council, referring to the lieutenant governor as the King's stand-in. One of the main duties of the Crown in a province is to appoint the individual most likely to maintain the confidence of the legislative assembly as premier; this is usually the leader of the political party with a majority in the legislature, but when no party or coalition holds a majority (referred to as a minority parliament), or similar scenario, the lieutenant governor's judgement about the most suitable candidate for premier must be brought into play. The premier thereafter heads the executive council, which is made up of other ministers of the Crown who are similarly drawn from and responsible to the elected legislature and are charged with advising the lieutenant governor on how to exercise the royal prerogative, which includes the privilege to maintain the King's peace, grant immunity from prosecution, and invoke the prerogative of mercy, as well as to summon and prorogue parliament and call elections. In the construct of constitutional monarchy and responsible government, the ministerial advice tendered is typically binding; the monarch reigns but does not rule. Though it may often appear differently, the royal prerogative belongs to the Crown, not to any of the ministers, and the viceregal figures may unilaterally use these powers in exceptional constitutional crisis situations. (Note: See note 1 at King's Privy Council for Canada.) On five occasions a lieutenant governor has dismissed a cabinet due to a crisis of confidence in the incumbent government: in Quebec in 1878 and 1891 and in British Columbia in 1898, 1900, and 1901. The Lieutenant Governor of British Columbia, Judith Guichon, in 2017 refused the advice of her premier to dissolve parliament and instead called on the leader of the opposition to form a government.

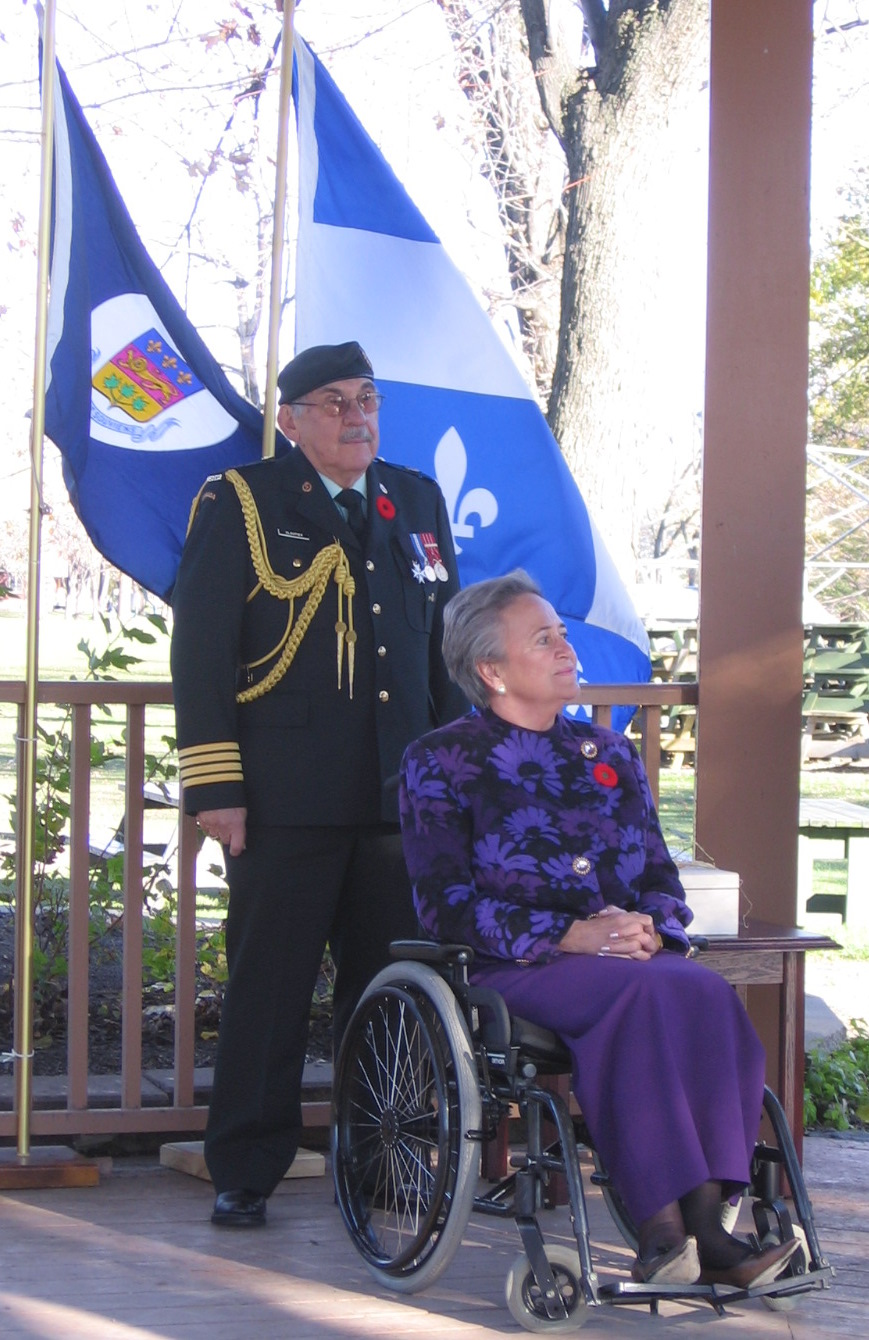
Lise Thibault, then Lieutenant Governor of Quebec, presiding over a ceremonial unveiling of sculptures by Maurice Lemieux, as part of her vice-regal duties, 1 November 2006

Members of various executive agencies and other officials—such as the attorney general, the secretary and registrar of the province, the treasurer, the commissioner of Crown lands, and the commissioner of agriculture and public works—are appointed by the Crown under the great seal of the province. Further, only in Nova Scotia and New Brunswick may the lieutenant governor appoint judges of the courts of probate, and only in Quebec is the solicitor general commissioned by the viceroy. Public inquiries are also commissioned by the monarch or governor-in-council through a royal warrant, and are called royal commissions.

=== Parliament ===
The lieutenant governor and the legislature are the two components of the parliament in each of the provinces, the former's authority therein being embodied in each house's mace, which all bear a crown at their apex. Also, the enacting formula in most provinces (British Columbia, Alberta, Saskatchewan, Manitoba, and New Brunswick) reads as: "Therefore, His Majesty, by and with the advice and consent of the Legislative Assembly of [Province], enacts as follows..." The viceroy, who may alone summon, prorogue, and dissolve the legislative assembly, drop the writs for a general election, and read the Speech From the Throne, does not participate in the legislative process, save for the granting of royal assent, which is required to make into law a bill passed by the legislature. The lieutenant governor may deny royal assent or reserve a bill for the governor general's decision, though the federal viceroy may further defer the bill to the monarch, who can disallow the bill within a time limit specified by the constitution. A bill has not been reserved for the governor general's consideration since 1961; (Note: Lieutenant Governor of Alberta John C. Bowen in 1937 refused to grant royal assent to three bills passed by William Aberhart's Social Credit government on the grounds that they were unconstitutional, and Lieutenant Governor of Saskatchewan Frank Lindsay Bastedo in 1961 reserved royal assent to the Mineral Contracts Alteration Act, passing it on, instead, to the Governor General for consideration.) Royal assent has not been denied since the Lieutenant Governor of Prince Edward Island did so in 1935.

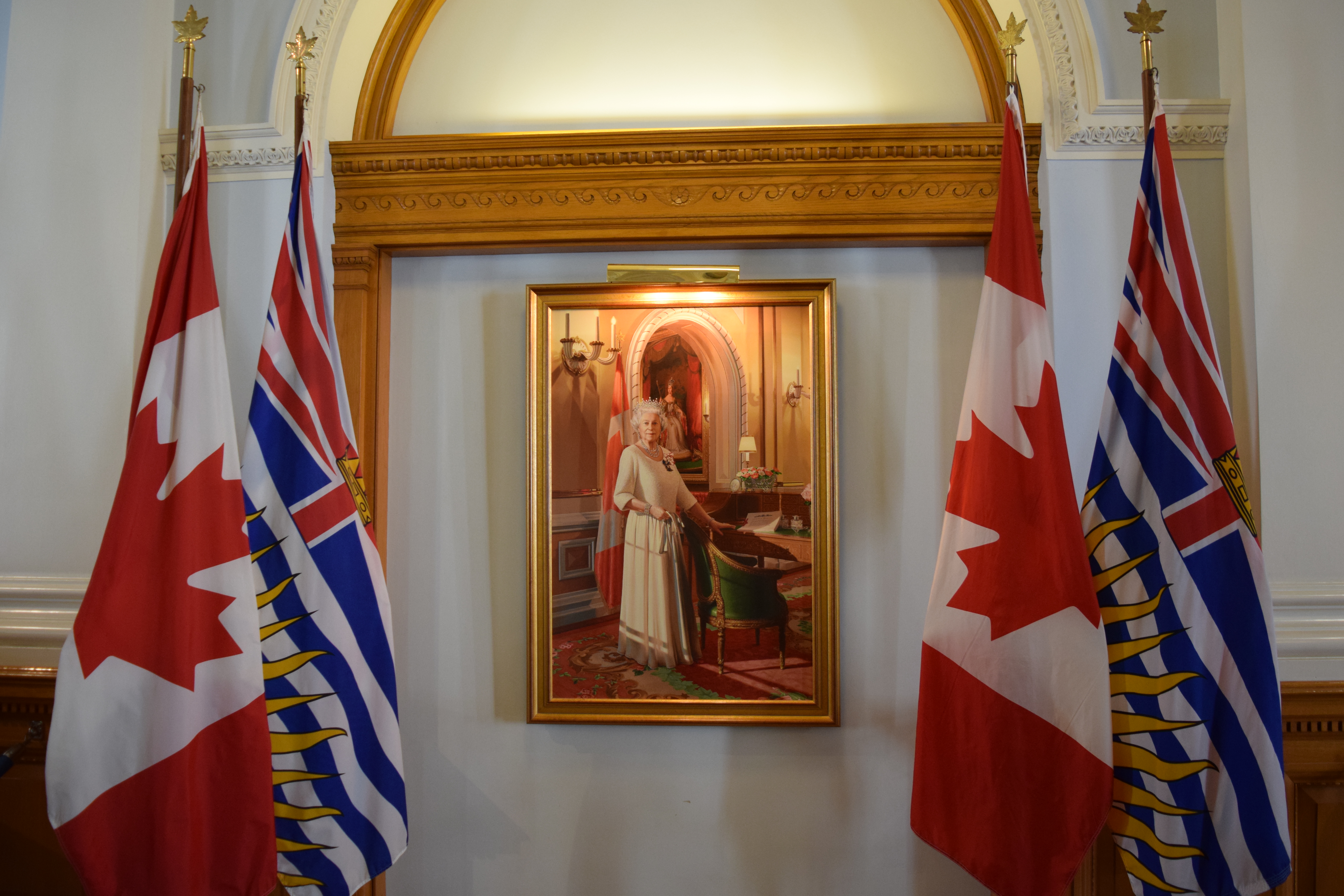
Queen Elizabeth II's portrait at the British Columbia Legislative Buildings

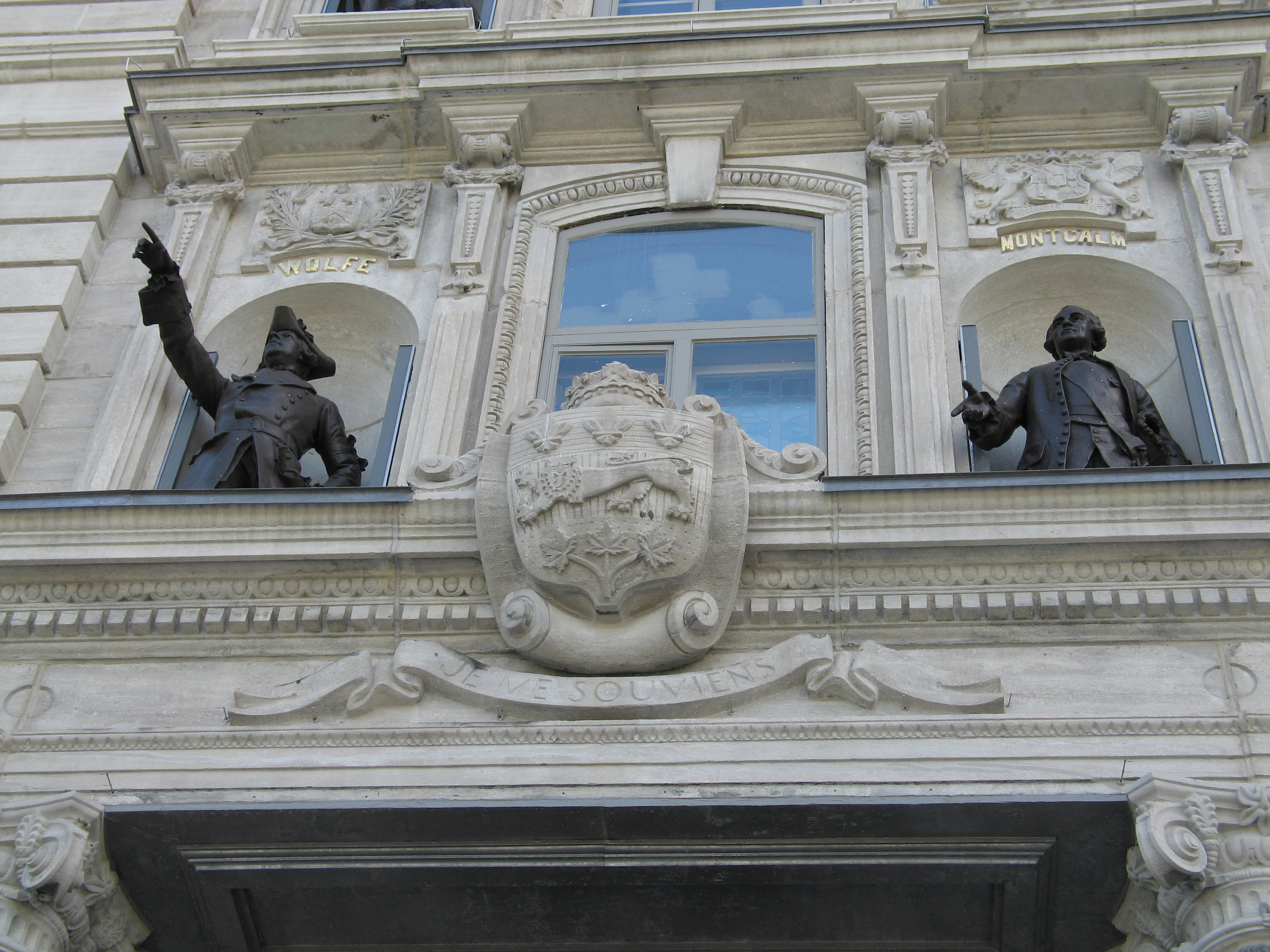
The Coat of Arms of Quebec carved in stone above the main entrance to the Quebec Parliament Building

The monarch's direct participation in the provincial legislatures is unclear. In 1939, King George VI held audience with his subjects in the Legislative Council Chamber of Quebec's parliament, but did not preside there as sovereign in the legislature; in a manner similar to how his daughter, Queen Elizabeth II, addressed the same legislature in 1964 and the Legislative Assembly of Alberta in 2005. In 1959, Premier of British Columbia W. A. C. Bennett wished to have Elizabeth II read the Speech From the Throne at the opening of the parliamentary session, but his request was turned down on the grounds that it was unconstitutional for the Queen to do so. Premier of Alberta Ralph Klein desired in 2005 to have the Queen grant royal assent to bills passed by Legislative Assembly of Alberta; this time, the proposal was rejected by the Secretary to the Governor General, Barbra Uteck, as being counter to the "Canadianization" of the Crown. Though united in their shock at the republican tone in this response from the federal viceroy's office, monarchists debated the legal legitimacy of denying the Queen the ability to give her assent to provincial bills. (Note: Kenneth Munro, a professor at the University of Alberta and former member of the Household at Rideau Hall, felt that the thinking at Government House in Ottawa was both politically and legally unfounded, seeing it as an attempt by the federal government and Rideau Hall to elevate the position of Governor General. – Richard Toporoski, a professor at the University of Toronto, saw the denial of the sovereign's granting of royal assent as correct, stating that, by the Constitution Act, 1867, the Queen does not form a part of the provincial legislatures.)

=== Courts ===
The sovereign is responsible for rendering justice for all his subjects, and is thus traditionally deemed the fount of justice. Neither he nor his viceroys personally rule in judicial cases; instead the judicial functions of the royal prerogative are performed in trust and in the King's name by officers of His Majesty's court, as is done in the federal jurisdiction. As the judges and courts are the sovereign's judges and courts, and as all law in Canada derives from the Crown, the monarch stands to give legitimacy to courts of justice and is the source of their judicial authority. An image of the King or his relevant provincial coat of arms is always displayed in provincial courtrooms, except in British Columbia and Newfoundland and Labrador, where the sovereign's arms for the United Kingdom are displayed. Itinerant judges will display an image of the King and the provincial flag when holding a session away from established courtrooms; such situations occur in parts of Canada where the stakeholders in a given court case are too isolated geographically to be able to travel for regular proceedings. Further, the superior courts of Alberta, Saskatchewan, Manitoba, and New Brunswick are called His Majesty's Court of King's Bench of [Province] (summarised as King's Bench), and the law in British Columbia, Newfoundland and Labrador, and Saskatchewan allows for the lieutenant governor to appoint prominent lawyers as King's Counsel, a predominantly honorary title recognising exceptional merit and contribution to the legal profession. The Manitoba government of New Democratic Party leader Gary Doer changed in 2001 the designation of King's Counsel to Senior Counsel, doing so against the opinion of the Benchers of the Law Society of Manitoba.

== Cultural role ==
=== Royal presence and duties ===
Either as the host or a guest of honour, the monarch, other members of the Canadian royal family, or the lieutenant governor attend throughout the year numerous provincial functions that fall into one of two categories: (Note: In 2004, the provincial viceroys participated in over 3,500 engagements.) official visits—which take place at the direction of the relevant provincial government, through the federal Department of Canadian Heritage, and include such events as centennials and bicentennials, the openings of fairs or races, anniversaries of First Nations treaty signings, awards ceremonies, commemorations, anniversaries of the monarch's accession, and the like—or working visits—which focus on organizations such as charities or military regiments, and the invitation and expenses associated with these undertakings are predominantly borne by the associated organization. Usually important milestones, anniversaries, or celebrations of Canadian culture will warrant the presence of the monarch, while other royals will be asked to participate in lesser occasions. Also, shorter, province-specific tours organized by the relevant provincial government have become more popular into the 21st century.

Throughout the provinces, there can thus be found plaques, cornerstones, and trees documenting official royal visits to the area. Gifts are also sometimes offered from the people of a province to the royal person to mark a visit or an important milestone.

It is also part of the lieutenant governors' duties (apart from the Lieutenant Governor of Quebec (Note: The National Order of Quebec, though instituted by an Order in Council given by Lieutenant Governor Jean-Pierre Côté, does not include in its constitution either the viceroy or the sovereign and specifically delegates to the Premier of Quebec the task of inducting new appointees.)) to bestow provincial honours upon deserving citizens. Only twice, so far, has a member of the royal family awarded in person a provincial honour: in 2004, Princess Anne, Princess Royal, presented in Saskatoon the Saskatchewan Protective Services Medal to 25 recipients and, on 6 July 2010, Queen Elizabeth II presented the Ontario Medal for Good Citizenship to four recipients.

=== Symbols, associations, and awards ===
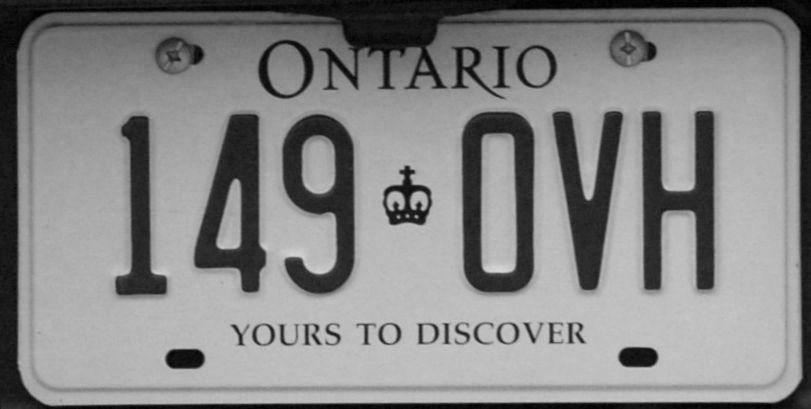
An Ontario vehicle licence plate showing an image of the Crown

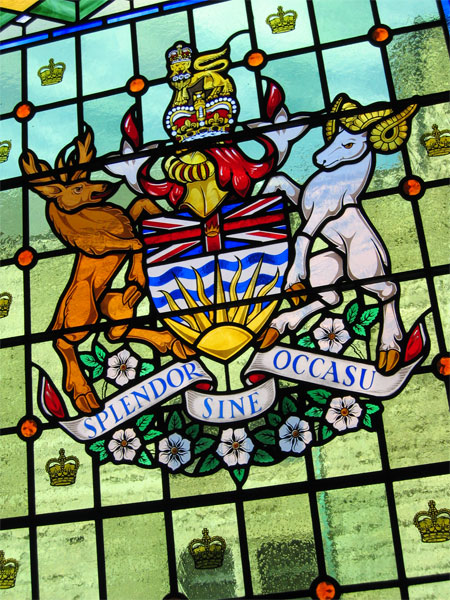
A stained glass rendition of the Coat of Arms of British Columbia, showing the St. Edward's Crown as the symbol of the locus from where all authority in the province of British Columbia flows

The main symbol of the monarchy is the sovereign himself and his image is thus used to signify government authority—his portrait, for instance, appearing in government buildings. A royal cypher or crown is also used to illustrate the monarchy as the locus of authority without referring to any specific monarch. The former appears on buildings and official seals and the latter on provincial coats of arms, as well as police force badges and rank insignia. The sovereign is also both mentioned in and the subject of songs, loyal toasts, and salutes.

The monarch is the fount of all honours in the Canadian provinces, the first being the Order of the Dogwood for the British Columbia's centennial in 1957. Unlike in the federal sphere, where new honors orders, decorations, and medals may only be created with the approval of the sovereign through letters patent, in the provinces these are created by an Order in Council signed by the relevant lieutenant governor in the monarch's name. Hence, the insignia and medallions for these awards bear a crown, cypher, or effigy of the monarch.

In 2022, the federal government opted not to produce a platinum jubilee medal, despite having issued medals for previous royal jubilees of Canadian monarchs. In response, six provinces—Alberta, Manitoba, New Brunswick, Nova Scotia, Prince Edward Island, and Saskatchewan—instituted a provincial platinum jubilee medal program to mark the Queen's seventy years on the Canadian throne.

Besides government and military institutions, a number of Canadian civilian organizations have association with the monarchy, either through their being founded via a royal charter (such as the Royal Winnipeg Ballet, the city of Saint John, New Brunswick, the Royal Kennebecasis Yacht Club, and McGill University), having been granted the right to use the prefix royal before their name (such as the Royal Quebec Golf Club and Royal Manitoba Winter Fair), or because a member of the royal family serves as a patron. Some of these organizations may use a royal crown in their logo or coat of arms, though this is in the gift of the monarch (and shows royal support or association), and thus requires his approval before being added.

==== Lieutenant Governor and Commissioner Badge of Recognition ====
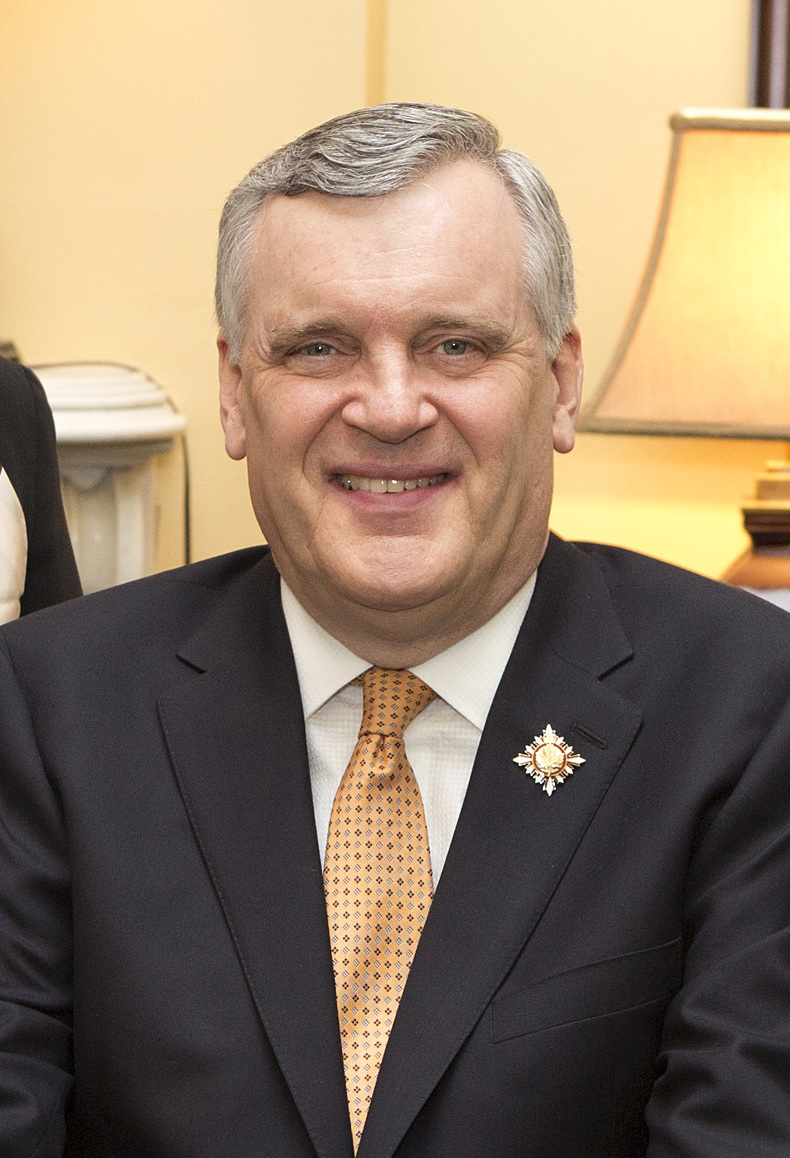
Former Lieutenant Governor of Ontario David Onley wearing the Viceregal Badge of Service on the lapel of his jacket

With Queen Elizabeth II's approval of the design, the Lieutenant Governor and Commissioner Badge of Recognition was created in January 1999. It features stylized maple leaf tips, in red and white enamel, forming a diamond shape, at the centre of which is a red ring bearing a maple leaf; the leaf on the lieutenant governors' and commissioners' badge is gold and the one on the badge for their spouses is silver. The diamond shape is topped by a rendering of St. Edward's Crown. On 1 January 2000, all living current and former lieutenant governors and their spouses were presented with the badge.

The Queen also authorized, in July 1998, to the use of the royal crown on the Viceregal and Commissioners Commendation, which consists of a gold bar enamelled in blue, with, at the middle, a circle containing three red maple leaves (as shown on the Royal Coat of Arms of Canada) surmounted by the crown. The crowned circle with leaves also forms a smaller lapel pin. The commendation was first manufactured at the same time as the badge of recognition. It is used by lieutenant governors to recognize excellent service to the respective viceregal offices. The number of nominations permitted during a lieutenant governor's tenure depends on the number of staff working in the viceregal office or household.

== See also ==
- Monarchy in Newfoundland and Labrador
- Monarchy in Prince Edward Island
- Monarchy in Nova Scotia
- Monarchy in New Brunswick
- Monarchy in Quebec
- Monarchy in Ontario
- Monarchy in Manitoba
- Monarchy in Saskatchewan
- Monarchy in Alberta
- Monarchy in British Columbia
- List of current Canadian lieutenant governors and commissioners

== Further information ==
=== Reading ===
- Bousfield, Arthur; Toffoli, Gary (1991). Royal Observations: Canadians and Royalty. Hamilton: Dundurn Press. ISBN 1-55002-076-5. "Royal Observations: Canadians and Royalty."
- Coates, Colin (2006). Majesty In Canada: Essays On The Role of Royalty. Hamilton: Dundurn Press. ISBN 1-55002-586-4.
- Ivie, Opal L. (1993). Palace to Prairie. Regina: Tucker's Printing Co.
- MacKinnon, Frank (1976). The Crown in Canada. Calgary, Alta.: Glenbow-Alberta Institute: McClelland and Stewart West. 189 p. ISBN 0-7712-1016-7 pbk
- Monet, Jacques (1979). The Canadian Crown. Toronto-Vancouver: Clarke, Irwin & Company Ltd. ISBN 0-7720-1252-0.
- Munro, Kenneth (1977). Coates, Colin (ed.). "The Crown and French Canada: The role of the Governors-General in Making the Crown relevant, 1867–1917". Imperial Canada. The University of Edinburgh.
- Munro, Kenneth (2005). The Maple Crown in Alberta: The Office of Lieutenant Governor. Victoria: Trafford. ISBN 978-1-4120-5317-4.
- Tidridge, Nathan (2011). Canada's Constitutional Monarchy: An Introduction to Our Form of Government. Toronto: Dundurn Press. ISBN 9781459700840.
- Tidridge, Nathan; Guthrie, Gavin (2007). The Canadian Monarchy: Exploring the role of Canada's Crown in the day-to-day life of our country. Toronto: Monarchist League of Canada. ISBN 978-0-9781853-0-5.

=== Viewing ===
- Executive Producer: Jack Tunnicliffe; Producer/Director: Frank Halbert; Writer: Bruce Edwards (1997). From palace to prairie: the Crown and responsible government in Saskatchewan (Video). Regina: Saskatchewan Intergovernmental Affairs, Recording Protax Production Group. AMICUS 17452571.
