= British Columbia Medal of Good Citizenship =

Honorary medal produced by British Columbia, Canada

- Ribbon of the medal
- Awarded for: Exceptional efforts, making outstanding contributions to the well being of communities.
- Country: Canada
- Presented by: Government of British Columbia
- First award: 2015

The British Columbia Medal of Good Citizenship is an honorary medal produced by the Canadian province of British Columbia. It was established by the Government of British Columbia in 2015 to recognize those who have “acted in a particularly generous, kind or selfless manner for the common good without expectation of reward".

It is very broadly modelled upon the Ontario Medal for Good Citizenship, but without the latter's rarity, its requirement of long-term commitment, or its strong emphasis upon volunteerism. An additional important distinction is that the British Columbia Medal of Good Citizenship may be bestowed upon communities and groups as well as individuals.

Each year, approximately 25 honorary medals are distributed. Recipients’ names, photographs and places of residence are listed on a Provincial website, as well as synopses of their respective civic achievements.

Individual recipients of the medal must be Canadian citizens or permanent residents, and current or former long-term residents of British Columbia. Judges and elected federal, provincial or municipal representatives are ineligible for nomination while such persons remain in office.

== Order of wear ==
The British Columbia Medal of Good Citizenship is not part of the Canadian order of precedence for decorations and medals prescribed by the Government of Canada.

As a purely honorary medal falling outside of the Canadian honours system, it may not be worn on the left side of the chest as are official medals.

== See also ==
- List of Canadian awards
- List of Canadian provincial and territorial orders
- Sovereign's Medal for Volunteers
- Ontario Medal for Good Citizenship
- Saskatchewan Volunteer Medal
