= Orders, decorations, and medals of the Canadian provinces =

The orders, decorations, and medals of the Canadian provinces comprise a system in which each province of Canada has created orders and other awards to honour residents for actions or deeds that benefit their local community or province, and are in turn subsumed within the Canadian honours system. Each province sets its own rules and criteria for eligibility and for how each award is presented. Most of the awards allow for the recipients to wear their awards in public, and most grant the recipients the use of post-nominal letters after their names. Not all of the awards created by the provinces are part of the Canadian honours system, therefore some of them may not be worn or court mounted with awards that are part of the Canadian honours system.

== Development ==
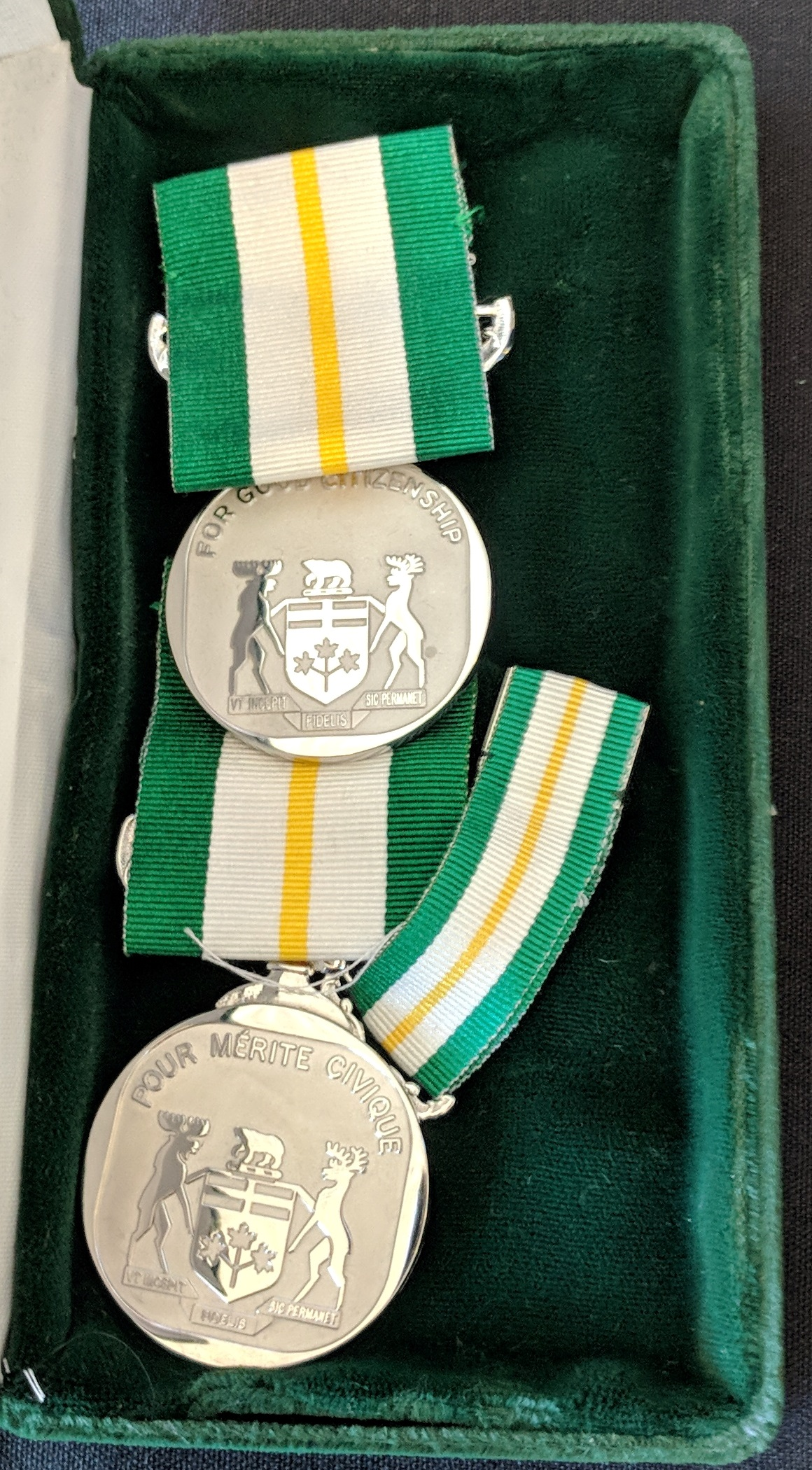
Ontario was the first province to establish their own honour with the Ontario Medal for Good Citizenship in 1973

British Columbia was the first province to establish an award that was distinct to the province: the Dogwood Medallion, created in 1957 for the centennial of the province and its preceding Colony of British Columbia, and reformed into the Order of the Dogwood in 1966.

After the establishment of the Canadian honours system in 1967, the rest of the provinces, recognizing the Crown's distinct operation within each provincial jurisdiction, moved to establish their own honours after Ottawa declined to do so on their behalf. Ontario was the first, creating the Ontario Medal for Good Citizenship in 1973, and the Police Bravery Medal and Firefighter's Bravery Medal in 1975 and 1976, respectively.

Alberta followed with the Alberta Order of Excellence in 1979. Quebec was the first province to establish a true order: l'Ordre national du Quebec in 1984. The Saskatchewan Order of Merit was established in 1985.

The Order of Ontario came in 1986, the Order of British Columbia in 1989 (which replaced the Order of the Dogwood), the Order of Prince Edward Island in 1997, the Order of Manitoba in 1999, and the Order of Nova Scotia, of New Brunswick, and of Newfoundland and Labrador in 2001.

However, the federal government did not recognize these honours and decorations, fearing duplications and citing the fact that, aside from the Order of Newfoundland and Labrador, the Queen had not authorized them. The provinces responded by stating that since provincial ministers did not constitutionally have the right to advise the sovereign directly, they would do so via legislation under the prerogative of the provincial Crown. The federal government finally came to recognize provincial orders after a compromise was reached between Governor General Ray Hnatyshyn and Lieutenant-Governor of Saskatchewan Sylvia Fedoruk, wherein provincial honours established by legislation or order in council would be ranked below all national honours, but above national decorations.

== Provincial and territorial orders ==
Name	Founded	Ribbon bar	Post-nominal letters	Number of inductees
Provincial
Alberta Order of Excellence	1979		A.O.E.	220
Order of British Columbia	1989 (Note: Replaced the Order of the Dogwood (O.D.), founded in 1966.)		O.B.C.	515
Order of Manitoba	1999		O.M.	
Order of New Brunswick	2000		O.N.B.	
Order of Newfoundland and Labrador	2001		O.N.L.	151
Order of Nova Scotia	2001		O.N.S.	126
Order of Ontario	1986		O.Ont.	903
Order of Prince Edward Island	1996		O.P.E.I.	82
National Order of Quebec (Note: French: Ordre national du Québec)	1984		G.O.Q., O.Q., C.Q. (Note: Presented in three grades: Grand Officer (grand officier); Officer (officier); Knight (chevalier))	1,201
Saskatchewan Order of Merit	1985		S.O.M.	262
Territorial
Order of the Northwest Territories	2013		O.N.W.T.	30
Order of Nunavut	2010		O.Nu.	25
Order of Yukon (Note: An unofficial order for the Yukon Territory, the Order of Polaris, had been created prior to the Order of Yukon in 2018, but was not a territorial order. It is not listed on the medals and orders chart for members of the Canadian Forces.)	2018		O.Y.	34

In all provinces except Quebec, the provincial honours are presented by the relevant Lieutenant-Governor. The territorial honours are presented by their respective Commissioner.

Most provincial orders only have one grade, or level, which is membership. The only province that has a multi-level order system is Quebec: the National Order of Quebec has three grades (in descending order of grade): Grand Officer (GOQ), Officer (OQ), and Knight (CQ).

The Canadian Forces has listed the following orders to be worn in the following manner: National Order of Quebec, Saskatchewan Order of Merit, Order of Ontario, Order of British Columbia, Alberta Order of Excellence, Order of Prince Edward Island, Order of Manitoba, Order of New Brunswick, Order of Nova Scotia and the Order of Newfoundland and Labrador. However, the CF has stated that while this is the order of sequence on a ribbon bar, it is unlikely or even impossible that a member will receive a medal or an order from all Canadian provinces.

Various people who have been awarded provincial orders have also been presented with national decorations and orders, such as the Order of Canada. An example of this would be Gordon Lightfoot being awarded the Order of Ontario. Lightfoot was also a Companion of the Order of Canada. Each province has a limit on how many can be awarded with their order per year: Ontario places no limit on the number that can be distributed (although it is usually around 25), Alberta and Saskatchewan are limited to 10 inductees each year, and the territories limit theirs to 3 per year.

== Provincial decorations ==
Name	Founded	Post-nominal letters	Number of inductees
Provincial
Ontario Medal for Good Citizenship	1973	O.M.C.	586
Saskatchewan Volunteer Medal	1995	S.V.M.	271

Ontario and Saskatchewan both award decorations in recognition of exceptional and long-term volunteerism. The Ontario Medal for Good Citizenship is the Province's oldest award, and pre-dates the Order of Ontario by 13 years. The Saskatchewan Volunteer Medal was introduced 10 years after the Saskatchewan Order of Merit.

Both provincial decorations are merit awards and require a substantial record of civic leadership. They are bestowed much more sparingly than the federal Sovereign's Medal for Volunteers.

== Provincial medals ==
Medals that are followed by + are not part of the official Canadian honours system, and as such may not be mounted with official honours or otherwise worn upon the left breast.

=== Saskatchewan ===
- Commemorative Medal for the Centennial of Saskatchewan
- Queen Elizabeth II Platinum Jubilee Medal (Saskatchewan)

=== Ontario ===
- Ontario Medal for Police Bravery
- Ontario Medal for Firefighters Bravery
- Ontario Provincial Police Long Service and Good Conduct Medal
- Ontario Medal for Young Volunteers +
- OBM Progress Medal +

=== British Columbia ===
- British Columbia Fire Services Long Service and Bravery Medals
- British Columbia Medal of Good Citizenship (MGC) +
- British Columbia Police Valorous Service Medal +
- British Columbia Police Meritorious Service Medal +

=== Alberta ===
- Alberta Centennial Medal
- Queen Elizabeth II Platinum Jubilee Medal (Alberta)
- Alberta Police Long Service Medal +
- Alberta Peace Officer Long Service Medal +
- Alberta Emergency Services Medal +
- Alberta Municipal Enforcement Long Service Medal +

=== Newfoundland and Labrador ===
- Newfoundland and Labrador Bravery Award
- Newfoundland Volunteer War Service Medal (Note: War Medal given to Newfoundlanders who fought in the Second World War as Newfoundland was a separate Dominion from Canada)

=== Manitoba ===
- Manitoba Excellence in Law Enforcement Award +
- Queen Elizabeth II Platinum Jubilee Medal (Manitoba)

=== New Brunswick ===
- Queen Elizabeth II Platinum Jubilee Medal (New Brunswick)

=== Nova Scotia ===
- Queen Elizabeth II Platinum Jubilee Medal (Nova Scotia)

=== Prince Edward Island ===
- Queen Elizabeth II Platinum Jubilee Medal (Prince Edward Island)
- PEI Firefighter’s Long Service Medal (Prince Edward Island)

=== Northwest Territories ===
- Northwest Territories Police Long Service Medal +

== See also ==
- Orders, decorations, and medals of Canada
- List of Canadian awards
- Canadian honours order of wearing
