= Ontario Medal for Good Citizenship =

Canadian award

Queen Elizabeth II Ontario Medal for Good Citizenship
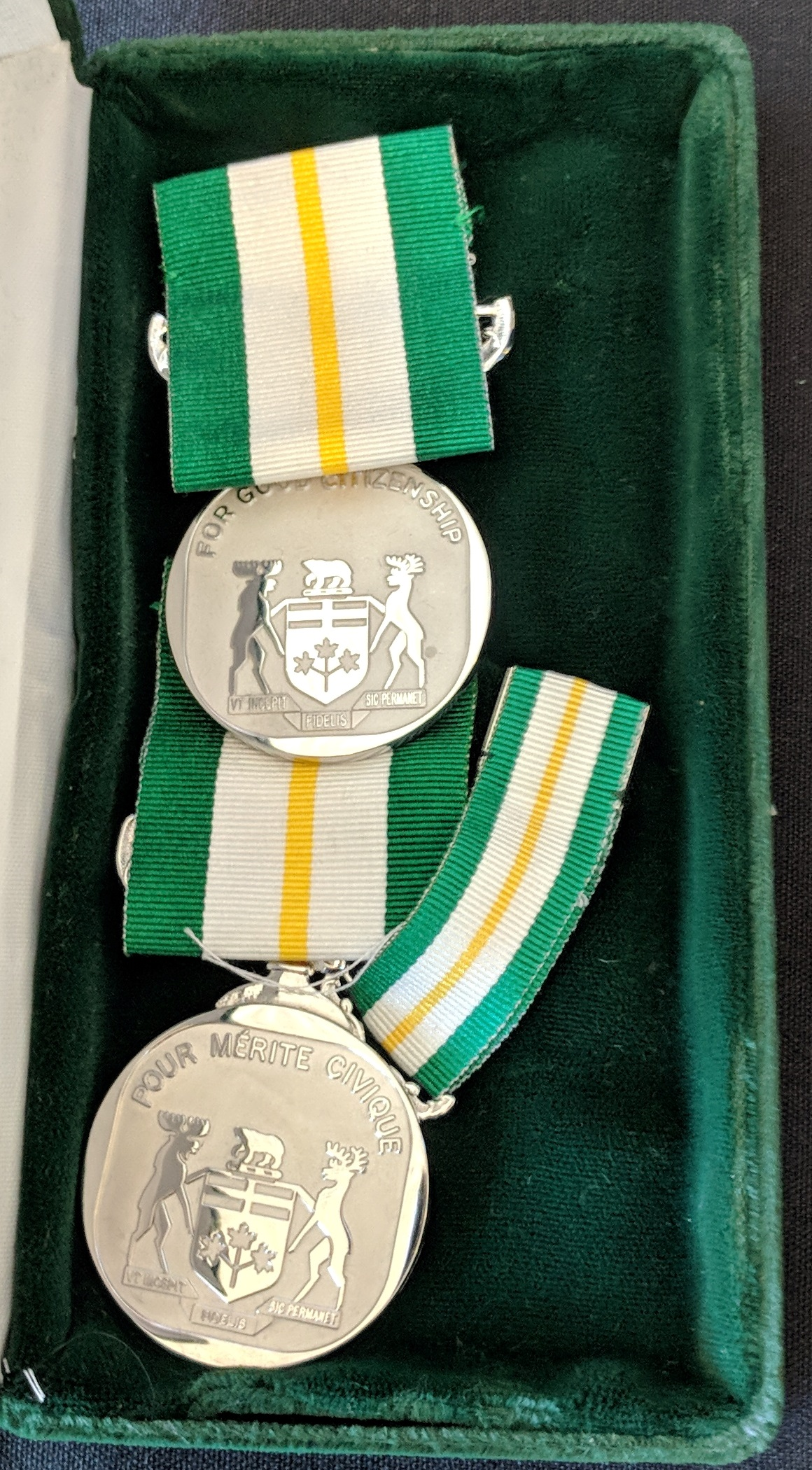
- Type: Provincial medal of merit
- Awarded for: Exceptional long-term efforts and outstanding contributions to well-being of communities
- Presented by: The lieutenant governor of Ontario
- Eligibility: Residents of Ontario who do not hold elected office
- Post-nominals: OMC
- Status: Currently awarded
- Established: 1973
- Ribbon bar

Precedence
- Next (higher): Queen's Medal for Champion Shot
- Next (lower): Ontario Medal for Police Bravery

The Queen Elizabeth II Ontario Medal for Good Citizenship is a provincial decoration awarded in the Canadian province of Ontario. The province's second-highest honour (ranking immediately beneath the Order of Ontario), it recognizes individuals whose extraordinary volunteer efforts have fostered positive change and left a lasting impact upon their communities and the province.

Recipients of the decoration are entitled to use the post-nominal letters OMC.

== Institution ==
It was established by the Government of Ontario during the Royal visit of Queen Elizabeth II in 1973, to recognize people who, through exceptional long-term efforts, have made outstanding contributions to the well-being of their communities and whose assistance is given without expectation of remuneration or reward.

== Selectivity ==
In terms of selectivity and rarity, the Ontario Medal for Good Citizenship is awarded very sparingly. It is the most selectively awarded community-service honour in the Commonwealth.

Typically, eleven to thirteen medals are awarded each year. As of March 10, 2025, a total of 586 Medals had been awarded.

With a per capita award rate averaging 0.8 per million/year, the Ontario Medal for Good Citizenship is the most selective non-bravery decoration currently awarded in Canada. By comparison, the per capita award rates for the Order of Ontario and the Saskatchewan Volunteer Medal average 1.3 per million/year and 5 per million/year, respectively.

== Eligibility ==
Any person or organization may make nominations for the decoration, but self-nominations will not be considered. Nominees must be residents of Ontario. No elected federal, provincial, or municipal representative may be awarded the decoration while such person remains in office.

Recipients are selected by an independent Advisory Council, which has the lieutenant governor of Ontario as its honorary chair.

The decoration may not be awarded posthumously unless the Advisory Council had selected the recipient prior to their death.

== Order of wear ==
Within the Canadian order of precedence for decorations and medals prescribed by the Government of Canada, the Queen Elizabeth II Ontario Medal for Good Citizenship is worn immediately after the Queen's Medal for Champion Shot and immediately before the Ontario Medal for Police Bravery.

== Description ==
- The Medal is silver (.925 fine silver) and struck as a circular disc, 36 millimetres in diameter and 3 millimetres thick. The suspender is of an ornamented scroll pattern.
- The obverse side of the Medal bears the coat of arms of the Province of Ontario, surmounted by the words 'For Good Citizenship'.
- The reverse side of the Medal bears a stylized trillium, with the words 'Ontario Medal' inscribed underneath. The reverse side is also engraved with the recipient's name and the date of investiture.
- The 38 mm wide ribbon is white, with broad edges of kelly green and a narrow yellow centre stripe. The ribbon's three colours - green, white and yellow - are those of the white trillium, Ontario’s provincial flower.

== Renaming ==
Originally established as the Ontario Medal for Good Citizenship, in 2024 the decoration was renamed to honour the late Queen Elizabeth II. The 2023 cohort were the final recipients of the original version of the decoration.

== See also ==
- List of Canadian awards
- List of Canadian provincial and territorial orders
- Sovereign's Medal for Volunteers
- Saskatchewan Volunteer Medal
- British Columbia Medal of Good Citizenship
