= Prince of Wales Prize for Municipal Heritage Leadership =

The Prince of Wales's feathers, which forms a part of the logo of the Prince of Wales Prize.

The Prince of Wales Prize for Municipal Heritage Leadership is an award presented annually to a Canadian municipality that has demonstrated a commitment to the conservation of its historic built environment, through regulation, policies, and funding. Created in 1999 by the Heritage Canada Foundation, the award is named for the then-Prince Charles, who agreed to lend his title as he has personal interests in architecture and inner-city renewal.

The municipality receives a metal plaque bearing the insignia of the Prince of Wales and the Heritage Canada Foundation, a flag with the same emblems to be flown outside or displayed within the city or town hall, and the prize's logo must be displayed on the municipality's website. In 2008, the first ever Prince of Wales Prize Honourable Mention was awarded.

== Recipients ==
- 2000: Markham, Ontario
- 2001: Victoria, British Columbia
- 2002: Saint John, New Brunswick
- 2003: Quebec City, Quebec
- 2004: Perth, Ontario
- 2005: Charlottetown, Prince Edward Island
- 2006: Annapolis Royal, Nova Scotia
- 2007: St. John's, Newfoundland and Labrador
- 2008: Aurora, Ontario
  - Honourable mention: Saint-Raymond, Quebec
- 2009: Edmonton, Alberta
- 2010: Oakville, Ontario
  - Honourable mention: Calgary, Alberta
- 2011: Peterborough, Ontario
- 2012: City of Saguenay for the District of Arvida, Quebec
- 2013: Owen Sound, Ontario
- 2014: Bonavista, Newfoundland and Labrador
- 2015: Grimsby, Ontario
- 2016: Richmond, British Columbia
- 2017: Thorold, Ontario
- 2018: Westmount, Quebec
- 2019: Maple Creek, Saskatchewan
- 2020: Niagara-on-the-Lake, Ontario

== See also ==
- List of Canadian awards
