= List of Canadian awards =

This is a list of all known awards in Canada, conferred by either members of the royal family, viceroys, governments, or private organizations.

== National awards ==
=== Royal awards in the federal jurisdiction ===
Awarded by	Award	Created	For
Monarch of Canada	King's Gold Medal for Poetry	1933	Outstanding book of verse
Monarch of Canada	Queen Elizabeth II Cup		Show jumping championship
Monarch of Canada	King's Plate	1860	Thoroughbred horse racing championship
Monarch of Canada	Queen Elizabeth II Trust Fund	1977	Young Canadians' understanding of each other's language and culture
Prince of Wales	Prince of Wales Prize for Municipal Heritage Leadership	1999	Conservation and preservation of buildings of historic importance
Prince of Wales	Prince of Wales Stakes	1929	Thoroughbred horse racing championship
Prince of Wales	Prince's Youth Service Awards	2015	Young Canadians taking positive actions both in Canada and in the global community
Prince and Princess of Wales	Duke and Duchess of Cambridge's Parks Canada Youth Ambassadors Program	2012	Encourage young Canadians to connect with the country's national parks
Duke of Edinburgh	The Duke of Edinburgh's Award	1956	Social, practical, and physical skills
Duke of Edinburgh	Duke of Edinburgh's Cup		The Duke of Edinburgh's Cup golf tournament
Duchess of Edinburgh	The Countess of Wessex Cup	2010	In military skills, the best of the regiments of which Sophie, Duchess of Edinburgh, is colonel-in-chief.
Duke and Duchess of York	Duke and Duchess of York's Prize in Photography	1989	Excellence in photography
Duke and Duchess of York	Prince Andrew Cup		Cross country running championship

=== Military awards in the federal jurisdiction ===
Awarded by	Award	Created	For
Canadian Forces	Canadian Forces Medallion for Distinguished Service	1989	Outstanding service by individuals and groups who are not active members of the Canadian Forces
The Calgary Highlanders (10th Canadians)	Clan of the Gallant Canadians	1992	Outstanding members of the regiment

=== Private awards in the federal jurisdiction ===
Awarded by	Award	Created	For
Scouts Canada	Queen's Venturer Award	1984	Highest Scouting proficiency
Scouts Canada	Queen's Scout	1909	High achievement in Scouting
Heritage Canada	Prince of Wales Prize for Municipal Heritage Leadership	1999	Commitment to the conservation of its historic built environment
Social Sciences and Humanities Research Council of Canada	Queen's Fellowship		Outstanding doctoral fellow entering a programme in Canadian studies
Canada's Walk of Fame	Walk of Fame star	1998	Achievements and accomplishments of successful Canadians
United Nations Association in Canada	Pearson Medal of Peace	1979	Contribution to international service
Royal Society of Canada	Awards from the Royal Society of Canada	Varies	Varies
Royal Canadian Mounted Police	Connaught Cup	1914	Pistol marksmanship
National Hockey League	Prince of Wales Trophy	1923	Eastern Conference playoff championship
Excellence Canada	Canada Awards for Excellence	1984	Business excellence in quality
CPACT Choice Awards	Canada Business Awards for Business	2017	Business Awards via Voting

== Provincial awards ==
=== Royal awards ===
- Vice-Regal Badge of Service (for all Lieutenant governors/territorial commissioners [gold] and all their spouses [silver])

=== Viceregal awards ===
- Vice-Regal and Commissioners' Commendation (presented by lieutenant governors and commissioners to recognise service to their respective offices)

=== Alberta ===
==== Royal awards in Alberta ====
- Royal Life Saving Awards
- Queen's Golden Jubilee Scholarships for the Visual and Performing Arts
- Queen's Golden Jubilee Citizenship Medal
- Queen Elizabeth II Graduate Scholarship Program

==== Viceregal awards in Alberta ====
- Institute of Public Administration — Lieutenant Governor Award
- Lieutenant Governor of Alberta Arts Awards Program
- Lieutenant Governor's Greenwing Conservation Award
- Lieutenant Governor's Leadership for Active Communities Award

=== British Columbia ===
==== Viceregal awards in British Columbia ====
- Vice-Regal and Commissioners Commendation Bar
- Lieutenant Governor's Daryl Duke Awards for Screenwriting
- Lieutenant Governor's Technology and Innovation Award
- Lieutenant Governor's Awards for Public Safety
- Lieutenant Governor's Conservation Award
- Lieutenant Governor's Awards for Excellence in British Columbia Wines
- Lieutenant Governor's Award for Literary Excellence
- Lieutenant Governor's Award for Engineering Excellence
- Lieutenant Governor's Silver Medal (University of Victoria)
- Lieutenant Governor of British Columbia Awards in Architecture
- Lieutenant Governor's silver medal for Excellence in Public Administration
- Lieutenant Governor's Medal for Historical Writing
- Lieutenant Governor's Silver Medal
- Lieutenant Governor's Trophy
- Lieutenant Governor's Handicap
- Lieutenant Governor's Prize
- Vice Regal Commendation

=== Manitoba ===
==== Royal awards in Manitoba ====
- Queen Elizabeth II Scholarship, Saint John's-Ravenscourt School, Winnipeg
- Queen Elizabeth II Silverwings Youth Scholarship

==== Viceregal awards in Manitoba ====
- Lieutenant Governor's Make a Difference Community Award
- Lieutenant Governor's Vice-Regal Volunteer Award
- Lieutenant Governor's Medal for Literacy
- Lieutenant Governor's Award for Excellence in Public Administration
- Lieutenant Governor's Award for Outstanding Contribution to the Community
- Lieutenant Governor of Manitoba Classroom Teacher Award (discontinued)
- Lieutenant Governor's Gold Medal (University of Manitoba, Degree Course in Agriculture)
- Lieutenant Governor's Gold Medal (University of Winnipeg, Bachelor of Arts (General) degree)
- Lieutenant Governor's Gold Medal (Brandon University)
- Lieutenant Governor's Silver Medals (Red River Community College, Diploma in Science Department, Diploma in Arts Department, Certificate in Science Department, Certificate in Arts Department)
- Lieutenant Governor's Silver Medals (Assiniboine Community College, Business Applied Arts Division, Industrial Technical Division)
- Lieutenant Governor's Silver Medals (Keewatin Community College, Applied Studies Department, Trades and Technologies Department)
- Lieutenant Governor's Silver Medals (Keewatin Community College, academic or vocational program)
- Lieutenant Governor's Youth Experience Program
- Lieutenant Governor's Trophy for the Winnipeg Music Competition Festival
- Lieutenant Governor's Gold Medal for the Manitoba Provincial Rifle Association

=== New Brunswick ===
==== Royal awards in New Brunswick ====
- Queen Elizabeth II Scholarship

==== Viceregal awards in New Brunswick ====
- Lieutenant Governor's Prix Dialogue Award du lieutenant-gouverneur
- Lieutenant-Governor's Award for Excellence in Architecture
- Lieutenant-Governor's Award for Excellence in Public Administration
- Lieutenant-Governor's Prize for the Conservation of Wild Atlantic Salmon
- Lieutenant-Governor's Award for Youth in Action, Youth in Motion

=== Newfoundland and Labrador ===
Lieutenant Governor's awards of Excellence in Architecture

=== Nova Scotia ===
==== Viceregal awards in Nova Scotia ====
- Vice-Regal and Commissioners Commendation Bar
- Lieutenant Governor of Nova Scotia Masterworks Arts Award
- Lieutenant Governor of Nova Scotia's Ready to Write/Prêt à Écrire Award
- Lieutenant Governor's Award for Conservation
- Lieutenant Governor's Award of Excellence in Engineering
- Lieutenant Governor's Award of Excellence in Public Administration
- Lieutenant Governor's Design Awards for Architecture
- Lieutenant Governor's Education Medal
- Lieutenant Governor's Greenwing Award
- Lieutenant Governor's Nova Scotia Talent Trust Award
- Lieutenant Governor's Princess Louise Fusiliers Award for Excellence
- Lieutenant Governor's Teaching Award
- Lieutenant Governor's Community Spirit Award
- Lieutenant Governor's Faith In Action Award
- Lieutenant Governor's Intergenerational Awards
- Lieutenant Governor's Community Voluntarism Award
- Lieutenant Governor's Persons with Disabilities Employer Partnership Award
- Lieutenant Governor's Hope and Inspiration Award
- Nova Scotia Talent Trust Award

=== Ontario ===
==== Royal awards in Ontario ====
- Queen Elizabeth II Scholarship
- Queen Elizabeth II Aiming for the Top Scholarship
- Ontario Golden Jubilee Award for Civilian Bravery
- Their Royal Highnesses The Duke and Duchess of Cambridge Award

==== Viceregal awards in Ontario ====
- Vice-Regal and Commissioners Commendation Bar
- Lieutenant Governor's Community Volunteer Award for Students
- Lieutenant Governor's Ontario Heritage Awards
- Lieutenant Governor's Award for Marketing Excellence in Ontario
- Lieutenant Governor's Literacy Pin
- Lieutenant Governor's Community Volunteer Award
- Lieutenant Governor's Award for Heritage
- Lieutenant Governor's Games Trophies, Award, and Medallions
- Lieutenant Governor's Medal of Distinction in Public Administration
- Lieutenant Governor's Cup
- Lieutenant Governor's Award for Excellence in Ontario Wines

==== Government awards in Ontario ====
- Amethyst Award for Outstanding Achievement by Ontario Public Servants
- Community Action Award
- Lincoln M. Alexander Award
- Ontario Volunteer Service Awards
- Outstanding Achievement Awards for Voluntarism in Ontario
- Senior Achievement Award
- Senior of the Year Award
- Trillium Book Award
- Ontario Medal for Young Volunteers

=== Quebec ===
==== Viceregal awards in Quebec ====
- Vice-Regal and Commissioners Commendation Bar
- Lieutenant Governor's Youth Medal (bronze)
- Lieutenant Governor's Seniors Medal (silver)
- Lieutenant Governor's Medal for Exceptional Merit (gold)

==== Government awards in Quebec ====
- Prix du Québec; awarded by the government of Quebec to individuals for cultural and scientific achievements. Founded in 1977, the government annually awards six awards in the cultural field and five in the scientific field.

Cultural awards

- Prix Albert-Tessier
- Prix Athanase-David
- Prix Denise-Pelletier
- Prix Georges-Émile-Lapalme
- Prix Gérard-Morisset
- Prix Paul-Émile-Borduas

Scientific awards

- Prix Albert-Tessier
- Prix Armand-Frappier
- Prix Léon-Gérin
- Prix Lionel-Boulet
- Prix Marie-Victorin
- Prix Wilder-Penfield

=== Saskatchewan ===
Saskatchewan's relationship with the sovereign continues to be rich and diverse. For example, you have chosen to recognize your citizens through honours of the provincial Crown, including the Saskatchewan Protective Services Medal which I have just presented. It provides a unique opportunity to show our gratitude for the men and women who devote their careers to ensuring our well-being – people who sometimes put their own safety and even their lives at risk to protect us all.

— The Princess Royal, Saskatoon, 2004

==== Royal awards in Saskatchewan ====
- Prince Edward Drama Scholarship
- Prince of Wales Scholarship
- Queen Elizabeth II Centennial Aboriginal Scholarship
- Queen Elizabeth II Scholarship
- Queen Elizabeth II Scholarship in Parliamentary Studies

==== Viceregal awards in Saskatchewan ====
- Vice-Regal and Commissioners Commendation Bar
- Canadian Cancer Society, Saskatchewan Division, Lieutenant Governor's Award of Distinction
- Heritage Canada Foundation Lieutenant Governor's Award
- Institute of Public Administration of Canada Lieutenant Governor's Medal
- Lieutenant Governor of Saskatchewan Heritage Architecture Excellence Award
- Lieutenant Governor of Saskatchewan Meritorious Achievement Award
- Lieutenant Governor's Award for Lifetime Achievement in the Arts
- Lieutenant Governor's Award for Outstanding Service to Rural Saskatchewan
- Lieutenant Governor's Awards of Excellence
- Lieutenant Governor's Medal for the Regina Men's Bonspiel
- Lieutenant Governor's Oval Sled Dog Award
- Saskatchewan Lieutenant Governor's Greenwing Conservation Award
- Lieutenant Governor's Celebration of the Arts Pin

== Territorial awards ==
=== Yukon ===
- Order of Polaris

== Municipal awards ==
- Order of Montreal
- Order of Hamilton
- Order of Ottawa

== Scholarships ==
Awarded by	Award	Created	For	Named for
Prince of Wales Scholarship	Lester B. Pearson United World College of the Pacific			Prince Charles (now Charles III, King of Canada)

== See also ==
- Orders, decorations, and medals of the Canadian provinces
- Orders, decorations, and medals of Canada
- Dufferin Medal
