= Dennis K. Yorath =

Canadian aviator (1905–1981)

Dennis Kestell Yorath, MBE (April 30, 1905 – May 8, 1981) was an aviator and business executive who was a Member of the Order of the British Empire for his contributions to Canadian aviation and in particular the British Commonwealth Air Training Plan during World War II.

== Education ==
Born in London, Ontario, Canada, Denis received education in Victoria, British Columbia, Saskatoon, Saskatchewan and his home town of London, Ontario.

== Career in business ==
Denis worked for the Imperial Bank of Canada at Edmonton, Alberta, for two years.

He then became an employee of Northwestern Utilities Limited in 1924, and in 1925 Canadian Western Natural Gas Company at Calgary, Alberta. In 1952 he became President and in 1962 was named Chairman. By 1969 Denis had become Vice-President and Director of the International Utilities Corporation, of which the previous companies were former subsidiaries.

== Aviation ==
Denis became a charter member of the Calgary flying club in 1928. He obtained a private pilot's licence and eventually went on to become a director and finally president of the club. During World War II Britain established the Commonwealth Air Training Plan to provide pilots for the war effort. It was for this work that he was named a Member of the Order of the British Empire. Denis was named the managing director of No. 5 Elementary Flying Training School at Lethbridge, Alberta. He remained in command of the school through its move to High River, Alberta until its closure in 1945. Denis was elected Alberta Zone Director in 1944 followed by an appointment to President in 1949 of The Royal Canadian Flying Clubs Association (RCFCA) In 1949 he was awarded the Trans Canada (McKee) Aviation trophy.

== Honours and recognition ==
- Yukon Territory Order of Polaris
- Canada's Aviation Hall of Fame
- The 1949 McKee Trophy
- Member of the Order of the British Empire.
- Honorary Degree from the University of Alberta
