= Order of Polaris =

Order conferred by the Government of Yukon

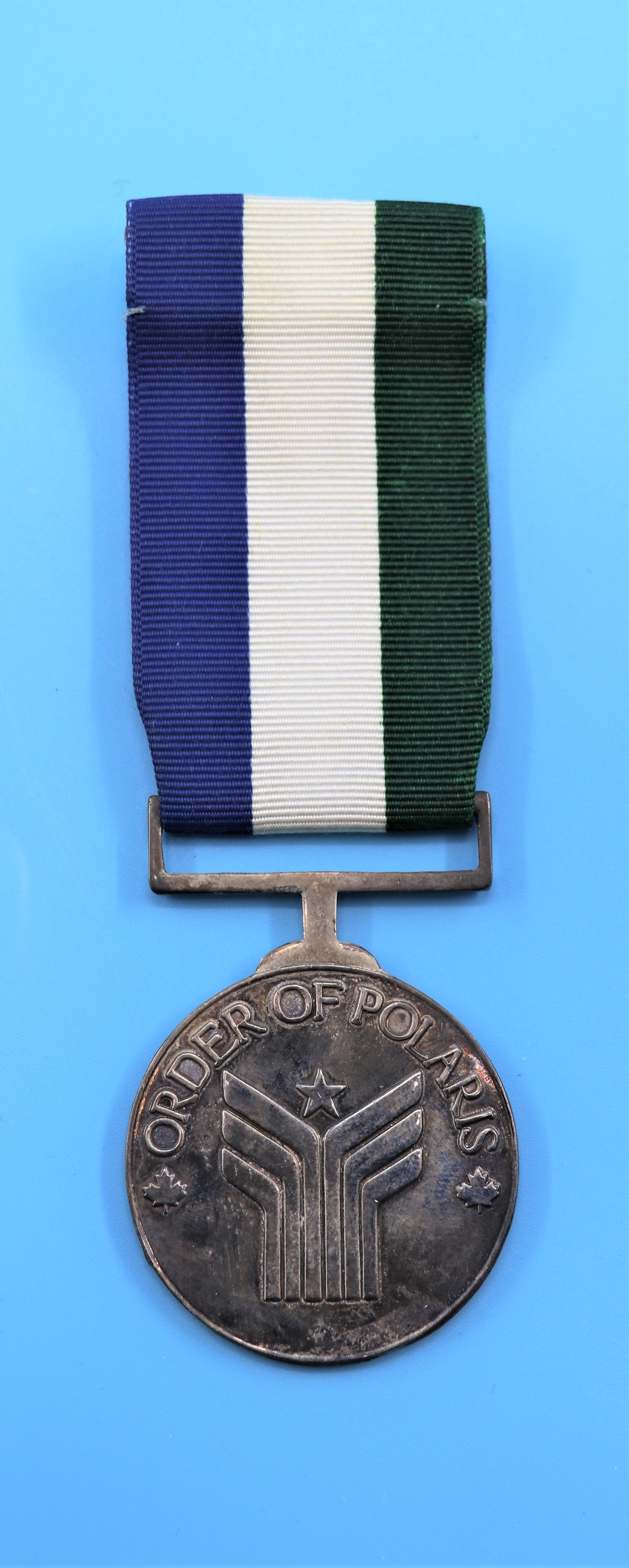
- Obverse side of medal

Awarded by Yukon Transportation Hall of Fame
- Type: Order
- Eligibility: Any Canadian citizen, preference to residents of Yukon
- Awarded for: Individuals, groups or associations whose contributions to aviation include meritorious service in Yukon
- Status: Currently awarded

Statistics
- First induction: 1973

The Order of Polaris is awarded by the Government of Yukon's Transportation Hall of Fame for meritorious service in Yukon in the field of aviation.

The Order of Polaris was created by the Government of Yukon in 1973, to honour members of the Canada's Aviation Hall of Fame, especially those who flew over Yukon. The medal and scroll were presented by the Commissioner of Yukon (or designate) at a ceremony at the Transportation Hall of Fame in Whitehorse. This medal is not part of the Canadian Honours System; an official Yukon honour, the Order of Yukon, was established in 2018.

== Description ==
The award is a simple, circular, silver medal. The obverse has a symbolic representation of the Polar star above and flanked by simulated aerial exhaust trails or stylized wings. Around the upper half of the medal are the words "Order of Polaris" preceded and followed by a maple leaf.

The reverse on the first series of medals is blank. The second series of medals have the coat of arms for Yukon with the word "YUKON" above it.

The ribbon has equal stripes of the colours of the Flag of Yukon - green, white and blue. For those recipients who flew over the territory during their aviation careers, a maple leaf bar, similar to that worn on the Canadian Volunteer Service Medal 1939–1945, is attached to the medal ribbon.

== Eligibility ==
Any Canadian citizen who is a current or former resident of Yukon is eligible for nomination.

== Recipients ==
There have been 88 appointments (including Chancellors) to the Order of Merit since its inception.

- Agar, Carlyle Clare (Carl)
- Archibald, William Monroe
- Armstrong, Neil J.
- Audette, Julien Joseph
- Austin, John Alexander (Jack)
- Baker, Albert William (Bill)
- Baker, Ronald John
- Baker, Russell Francis
- Balchen, Bernt
- Baldwin, Frederick Walker (Casey)
- Bannock, Russell
- Barker, William George (Bill)
- Bartsch, Dawn
- Bartsch, Gordon
- Bazalgette, Ian Willoughby
- Bell, Alexander Graham
- Berry, Arthur Massey (Matt)
- Beurling, George Frederick (Buzz)
- Bishop, William Avery (Billy)
- Blakey, Thurston (Rusty)
- Brintnell, Wilfrid Leigh
- Bristol, Helen Marcelle Harrison
- Brown, Francis Roy
- Burbidge, Maurice (Moss)
- Burke, Carl Frederick
- Capreol, Erskine Leigh
- Caywood, Alfred Beebe (Alf)
- Collins, Kelly
- Collishaw, Raymond (Collie)
- Curtis, Wilfrid Austin
- Davoud, Paul Yettvart
- Dickins, Clennell Haggerston (Punch)
- Dodds, Robert Leslie (Bob)
- Douglas, D.J. (Don) 2009
- Fallow, Maurice D'Arcy Allen
- Fauquier, John Emilius (Johnny)
- Finland, George Harold (Mike)
- Forester, Norman Gladstone (Norm)
- Fowler, Walter Warren (Walt)
- Fox, Thomas Payne (Tommy)
- Foy, James Henry
- Franks, Wilbur Rounding
- Fraser, Douglas Cowan
- Fullerton, Elmer Garfield
- Garratt, Philip Clarke (Phil)
- Gilbert, Walter Edwin
- Godfrey, Albert Earl
- Graham, Stuart
- Grandy, Roy Stanley (Bill)
- Gray, Robert Hampton
- Hartman, Paul Albert
- Hayter, Henry Winston (Harry)
- Hobbs, Basil Deacon
- Hollick-Kenyon, Herbert (Bertie)
- Hopson, Herbert
- Hornell, David Ernest
- Howe, Clarence Decatur
- Hutt, Albert Edward
- Jewitt, William Gladstone
- Kennedy, Harry Marlowe
- Knox, Wilbert George Melvin (Mel)
- Lawrence, Thomas Albert
- Leckie, Robert
- Leigh, Zebulon Lewis (Lewie)
- Lilly, Alexander John (Al)
- Lothian, George Bayliss
- Lucas, Joseph Henry
- MacDougall, Frank Archibald
- MacGill, Elizabeth Muriel Gregory (Elsie)
- MacInnis, Gerald Lester (Gerry)
- MacLaren, Donald Roderick
- MacLeod, Merlin William (Mac)
- May, Wilfrid Reid (Wop)
- May, William Sidney
- McCall, Fred Robert Gordon
- McConachie, George William Grant
- McCurdy, John Alexander Douglas
- McGregor, Gordon Roy
- McLean, Alexander Daniel (Dan)
- McLeod, Alan Arnett
- McMillian, Stanley Ransom (Stan)
- McMullen, Archibald Major (Archie)
- McNair, Robert Wendell (Buck)
- Mead, Bert william
- Michaud, Almer Leonard (Al)
- Middleton, Robert Bruce
- Moar, Jack
- Munro, Raymond Alan
- Mynarski, Andrew Charles (Andy)
- Neal, George Arthur
- Newson, William Francis Montgomery (Bill)
- Oaks, Harold Anthony (Doc)
- Orr, Marion Alice Powell
- Palmer, John Ender (Jock)
- Phillips, George Hector Reid
- Phipps, Welland Wilfrid (Weldy)
- Plant, John Lawerence
- Reid, Thomas Mayne (Pat)
- Reilly, John Hardisty (Jack)
- Reilly, Moretta Fenton Beall (Molly)
- Richardson, James Armstrong
- Russell, Frank Walter
- Ryder, Lloyd 2007
- Sanderson, William John (Jack)
- Seagrim, Herbert Walter (Herb)
- Seymour, Murton Adams
- Showler, John Gavin (Jack)
- Siers, Thomas William (Tommy)
- Sims, Arthur George (Tim)
- Sloan, John Charles (Jaycee)
- Stedman, Ernest Walter
- Sutherland, Alexander Mackay (Mickey)
- Tomlinson, Samuel Anthony (Sammy)
- Tripp, Leonard John (Len)
- Tudhope, John Henry (Tuddy)
- Turnbull, Wallace Rupert
- Turner, Percival Stanley (Stan)
- Vachon, Joseph Pierre Romeo
- Vanhee, Achille (Archie)
- Williams, Thomas Frederic (Tommy)
- Wilson, Arthur Haliburton
- Wilson, John Armistead
- Woollett, Walter 'Babe'
- Yorath, Dennis Kestell
- Young, Franklin Inglee (Frank)

== See also ==
- List of Canadian awards
- List of Canadian provincial and territorial orders
