= Walter "Babe" Woollett =

Canadian pilot

Walter "Babe" Woollett (1 January 1906 – 2 June 1998) was a Canadian pilot who was inducted into the Québec Air and Space Hall of Fame on 26 November 2003 and Canada's Aviation Hall of Fame 2004.

== Aviation career ==
Born in Rochester, Kent, England, Woollett served in the RAF from 1924 until 1929 soon after finding work as a bush pilot in the Fairchild organization at Lac-à-la-Tortue, Quebec. By the end of 1930, he began flying the mail from Saint-Hubert, Quebec to Saint John, New Brunswick for Canadian Airways. During World War II, Woollett was heavily involved in the British Commonwealth Air Training Plan overseeing schools in Ontario and Quebec. After the war, he was appointed Superintendent of Canadian Pacific Air Lines Eastern Division in Mont-Joli and credited with developing their network in the Pacific.

== Honours and recognition ==
- Order of the British Empire.
- Yukon Territory Order of Polaris
- Canada's Aviation Hall of Fame

== Death ==
Woollett died Monday 2 June 1998 at his residence in Oahu, Hawaii.
