= Dawn Bartsch =

Canadian pilot

Dawn Bartsch (née Dawson; born 1932) is a Canadian retired bush pilot and flight instructor.

== Biography ==
Bartsch was born in Penticton, British Columbia, Canada, in 1932. She was interested in becoming a pilot from a young age, although careers counsellors at her high school advised her that becoming a female pilot was impossible, and to train as a nurse instead. Nevertheless, she applied to McGill University's aviation school. She was rejected due to her gender, and had to apply elsewhere until a flight school in Vancouver agreed to give her a place in their programme. The teachers were impressed with her aptitude and skills, however on completion of her studies, in 1951, the government inspector refused to give Bartsch the flying test. Bartsch's teacher persuaded the inspector to take her for the test; he later told the teacher that Bartsch flew so well he couldn't refuse her a license. When Bartsch and her flight school classmates were hired to what would become Air Canada, the company changed their job offer on realising her sex, and she was offered a flight attendant position rather than a pilot position. Bartsch declined and found work as a flight instructor in Calgary, Alberta, instead, although at half the pay of her male colleagues. Although more progressive airlines eventually agreed to hire her as a pilot, the Canadian Air Line Pilots’ Association refused to accept women members.

In the late 1950s Bartsch moved to Dawson City, Yukon, and set up an air transport business in partnership with her father and a fellow pilot, Ron Connelly. The company, Connelly-Dawson Airways, flew mail, fuel and food supplies to remote communities in the Yukon and Arctic Circle regions. Many of the communities lacked airfields, and Bartsch frequently had to land on sandbars and frozen lakes. In the early 1970s Bartsch retired from the business and moved to Hawaii.

Bartsch continued to fly, in international race events - in 1997 she won a bronze medal in the 1997 World Air Games long distance race. Bartsch also participated in the London to Sydney event, then crossing the Pacific to Hawaii.

=== Recognition ===
In 2011, Bartsch was inducted into the Yukon Transportation Hall of Fame and received the Yukon Territory Order of Polaris in recognition of her work in the region. In 2015, Bartsch received the Elsie MacGill Northern Lights Award for Pioneers.

=== Personal life ===
In 1962, Bartsch married Gordon Bartsch, a pilot she had hired to work at Connelly-Dawson Airways.
