= Basil Deacon Hobbs =

Canadian aviator (1894–1965)

- Photographed in 1920.
- Born: 20 December 1894; Arlington, Berkshire, England
- Died: 28 November 1965; Montreal, Quebec, Canada
- Occupation: Aviator

Basil Deacon Hobbs, DSO, OBE, DSC (20 December 1894 – 28 November 1965) was a British and Canadian aviator. He is the second most highly decorated pilot in Canada.

== Early years ==
Hobbs moved to Canada with his family at age in 1900 at age 15. In 1915, he went to take flight training at the Wright Flying School in Dayton, Ohio.

== First World War service ==
In 1915, Hobbs Joined the Royal Naval Air Service as a flight lieutenant. During the war he was awarded the Distinguished Service Cross (1917), the Distinguished Service Order, and a Bar to the Distinguished Service Cross that same year. While flying a Curtiss H-12 Large America flying boat, he was one of the few Canadian pilots to score a victory over a German Zeppelin L.43.

== Interwar flying ==
In 1919, Hobbs was among six pilots hired by Hubert Scott-Paine to fly commercial flights for his company Supermarine. In 1920, Hobbs joined the Royal Canadian Air Force. He resigned his commission in 1927 holding the rank of major. During this time, he was employed by the Canadian Air Board as a "certificate examiner".

== Second World War service ==
At Canada's entry into the Second World War, Hobbs was recommissioned as a group captain in the RCAF. Stationed in Dartmouth, Nova Scotia, he was employed in anti-submarine operations and training.

== Death ==
Hobbs died on 28 November 1965 in Montreal.

== Awards and honours ==
- Distinguished Service Cross 1917
- Distinguished Service Order 1917
- Bar to Distinguished Service Cross 1917
- Mentioned in Despatches 1917
- Officer of the Order of the British Empire
- Canada's Aviation Hall of Fame 1987
- Yukon Territory Order of Polaris
