= Order of the Dogwood =

Canadian provincial civilian honour (1966–1989)

The Order of the Dogwood was the province of British Columbia's highest civilian honour for public service from 1966 to 1989, during which time 13 individuals were granted the honour of being appointed to the order. It is named after the Pacific dogwood, which has been British Columbia's provincial flower since 1956.

== History ==
The predecessor to the Order of the Dogwood, called the Dogwood Medallion, was created by the provincial Crown-in-Council in 1958 to commemorate the centennial of the establishment of the Colony of British Columbia. The Order of the Dogwood was created by order-in-council during a provincial Cabinet meeting held at Fort Langley on November 19, 1966, to mark the centennial of the union of the Colony of British Columbia with the Colony of Vancouver Island. Immediately following the meeting, Lieutenant Governor George Pearkes (a future appointee to the order) gave consent to the creation of the honour, which was then presented to the first recipients at the Douglas Day dinner that evening. The first five recipients were Queen Elizabeth, the Queen Mother, The Viscount Amory (then Governor of the Hudson's Bay Company), Sir Robert Bellinger (then Lord Mayor of London), Clarence Wallace, and Frank Mackenzie Ross; Bellinger and Ross were present for the ceremony.

The Order of the Dogwood was the highest provincial honour until 1989, when it was replaced by the Order of British Columbia. The last person granted the Order of the Dogwood was Terry Fox, who received it in 1980.

== The award ==
The granting of the award was not limited to British Columbia residents. The award could not be granted to a person currently holding public office under the authority of the province.

Recipients received a medal struck in gold, bearing the image of the dogwood flower on one side and the provincial coat of arms on the other. Recipients also received a certificate issued under the Great Seal of British Columbia.

== List of recipients ==
Between 1966 and 1989, a total of 13 individuals were granted the Order of the Dogwood:

- Queen Elizabeth The Queen Mother (1966)
- The Viscount Amory (1966)
- Robert Bellinger (1966)
- Clarence Wallace (1966)
- Frank Mackenzie Ross (1966)
- Princess Alexandra (1967)
- Nancy Greene Raine (1968)
- George Pearkes (1968)
- Queen Elizabeth II (1971)
- Prince Philip, Duke of Edinburgh (1971)
- Princess Anne (1971)
- Terry Fox (1980)

== See also ==
- Orders, decorations, and medals of the Canadian provinces
