= Sovereign's Medal for Volunteers =

- Type: Medal (national)
- Presented by: The monarch of Canada
- Status: Currently awarded
- Established: 1995 (as the Caring Canadian Award); 2015 (as the Sovereign's Medal for Volunteers)

Highlights
- Total: 6148
- Ribbon bar of the medal

Precedence
- Next (higher): Polar Medal
- Next (lower): Canadian Centennial Medal

The Sovereign's Medal for Volunteers (French: Médaille du souverain pour les bénévoles) is a Canadian medal intended to honour volunteers who have made a significant and continual contribution to their community, either in Canada or abroad. The medal was initially conceived by Governor General Roméo LeBlanc as the Governor General's Caring Canadian Award and created in November 1995, to award volunteers. It was replaced on 15 July 2015 by the Sovereign's Medal for Volunteers.

== Eligibility and selection ==
Three Canadian miniature medals including the Sovereign's Medal for Volunteers (centre), court mounted. The other insignia are those of a Serving Member of the Order of Saint John (left) and the Diamond Jubilee Medal (right).

The medal is intended for an individual whose unpaid, sustained voluntary contributions provide extraordinary help or care to individuals or groups in the community. Nominees must have brought honour to Canada through their work, and may belong to any age group; recipients typically have not previously been recognized by a national honour.

An independent advisory committee meets to review submissions. Once a nomination for a candidate is received, research is undertaken to confirm facts and a summary of information about each candidate is presented to the advisory committee for review. The committee submits recommendations to the governor general. The selection process is very thorough, and currently takes four years.

The certificate and lapel pin are presented to recipients by a dignitary, such as a lieutenant governor, territorial commissioner, mayor, or the executive head of a non-profit organization. On rare occasions, the governor general presents the medal during regional visits.

All previous recipients of the Caring Canadian Award received the Sovereign's Medal for Volunteers.

== See also ==
- List of awards presented by the governor general of Canada
- British Columbia Medal of Good Citizenship
- Ontario Medal for Good Citizenship
- Saskatchewan Volunteer Medal
