= National Trust for Canada =

Canadian charity focused on saving historical places

- La Fiducie nationale du Canada
- Type: national registered charity
- Headquarters: 190 Bronson Ave, Ottawa, ON K1R 6H4
- Key people: Ingrid Cazakoff, Chair; Patricia Kell, Executive Director
- Main organ: National Board of Governors
- Revenue: $1.35m CAD (2020)
- Website: nationaltrustcanada.ca
- Formerly called: Heritage Canada Foundation

The National Trust for Canada (French: La Fiducie nationale du Canada; formerly known as the Heritage Canada Foundation) is a national registered charity in Canada with the mandate to inspire and lead action to save historic places, and promote the care and wise use of Canada's historic environment.

Its sites, projects, and programs encourage Canadians to identify, conserve, use, celebrate, and value their heritage buildings, landscapes, natural areas, and communities for present and future generations. Established in 1973, the National Trust has campaigned to update and fill gaps in Canadian heritage policies and laws, including supporting legislation such as Heritage Lighthouse Protection Act. The National Trust for Canada also awards municipalities for their actions in preserving historical built environments through the Prince of Wales Prize for Municipal Heritage Leadership.

It is a member-based organization governed by a national board of volunteer governors. Its Council of Advisors include Pat Carney, Thomas H.B. Symons, Douglas Cardinal, John K.F. Irving, Glen MacDonald, Frederic L.R. Jackman, and Alexander Reford.

== Properties ==
The National Trust for Canada oversees three properties. In Quebec, the organization holds two properties: One is the Papineau Chapel, a stone memorial chapel built in 1851 by Louis-Joseph Papineau, on the grounds of the Château Montebello in the town of Montebello. It is the National Trust's first property, having been acquired in 1974. The other is 11 ruelle de l'Ancien-Chantier, two adjacent buildings erected in 1670, in the Lower Town of Quebec City. It was purchased by Heritage Canada to act as one of its regional offices, but now houses the offices of the French: Fondation Rues principales.

There is also a property in Ontario. The Myrtleville House is a two-storey structure built in Brantford between 1837 and 1838. Originally owned by Allen and Eliza Good, the house was occupied by four generations of their family until 1978, when the property – including the house, its contents, and 5.5 acres (22,000 m^{2}) of land – was donated to the Crown, which then transferred it in trust to the National Trust.

== See also ==
- The Prince's Charities
