= Ontario Medal for Young Volunteers =

- Type: Medal
- Awarded for: Outstanding achievements and contributions by young volunteers.
- Presented by: Lieutenant Governor of Ontario
- Eligibility: Ontario resident aged 15 to 24
- Established: 1998

Highlights
- Total: 217 as of 2025

The Ontario Medal for Young Volunteers is an honour presented annually by the Lieutenant Governor of Ontario for outstanding contributions by young volunteers in the province of Ontario and is the highest honour a young person can achieve for their contributions to the province. The medal is not part of the Canadian honours system and therefore cannot be worn with medals that are part of the Canadian Honours system.

== Background ==
The medal was created in 1998 to recognize the outstanding contributions of young people between the ages of 15 and 24, to improve the quality of life in Ontario and internationally through volunteer activities. By honouring outstanding contributions made by youth volunteers, this award recognizes exceptional young people as role models. Up to 10 recipients are chosen each year.

Recipients are selected by the Ontario Honors Advisory Council made up of seven members appointed by the lieutenant governor on the advice of his or her premier. The lieutenant governor is the honorary chair of the advisory council.

== Description ==
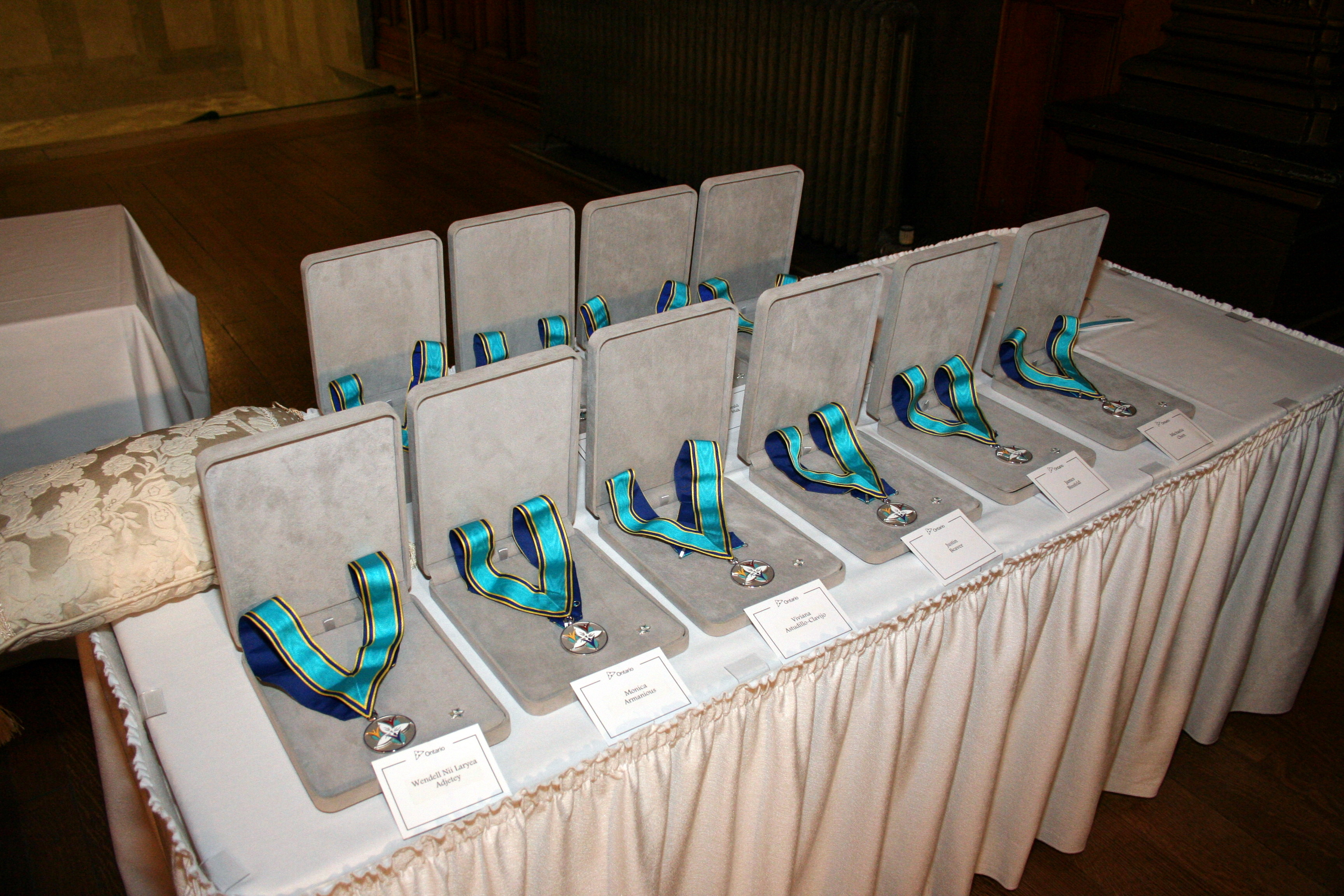
Medals awaiting presentation at the 2008 investiture

The medal is in the shape of a circle with a trillium (Ontario's floral emblem) in the centre and surrounded by three identical shapes signifying V for volunteer, and also signifying active people. The colours of the medal are red (the colour of the flag of Ontario), white (the colour of the trillium), blue and gold.

== Recipients ==
1998:

1999:

2000: Jeremy Baillargeon, Melissa Gould, Brenda Rollo

2001: Erin Ashley Beckett, Shashi Bhat, Shantel Ivits, Upasana Krishnadev, Heather McMullen, Heather Menzies, Louroz Munson Mercader, Marie-Claude Robert, Cynthia Rutters, Thomas Urbaniak

2002: Aaron James

2003:

2004:

2005: Arthur Kong, Jessica Asnani, Regina Lui, Kevin Goswell, Jordan Axani, Judy Hole, Sukhveer Bains, Myuri Manogaran, Adam Birrell, Tyler Meredith, Paul Cescon, Heather Muir, Sarah Dell, Christian Scenna, Roxanne Dubois, Jeffery Siu, Catherine French, Valeria Spezzano, Christina Fung, Victoria Zimmer

2006: Christopher Berrigan, David George, Mireille Gomes, Christina Katsios, Clifford Mushquash, Cheryl Perera, Alim Nagji, Jeeniraj Thevasagayam

2007: Maddison Babineau, Justin Lucas Beaver, James Binsfeld, Jeremy Dias, Ryan Hreljac, Christine Kerr, Laura Konkel, Derek Lawrence, Rohit Mehta, Jason Slater, Nomusa Taylor-Dube

2008: Wendell Adjetey, Monica Armanious, Viviana Astudillo-Clavijo, Michaela Chen, Matthew Cutler, Julie Harmgardt, Justin Fontaine, Gerald Mak, Adam Wheeler.

2009: Danny Fee, Tamara Gordon, Jonathan Hesler, Miles Hoffman, Mina Kazemi, Bronwyn Loucks, Billy Morrison, Bret Shier

2010: Arnav Agarwal, Christopher Albert, Neeka Allison, Michael Greige, Chris-Anna Manning, Lashawn Murray, Gorick Ng, Bryan Peart, Rob Ross, Eric Tan, Denny Timm, Matthew Wakem

2011: Amber Albert, Lorenzo Colocado, Joshua Edwards, Tyler Lisacek, Megan Myles, Rebecca Rainey, Conner Weed

2012: Meaghan Walker, Victoria Edwards, James Farry, Janette Hammell, Simon Harmgardt, Rebecca Linder

2013: Janelle Brady, Mariah Bunz, Alex Escobar, Tyson Grinsell, Mohsin Khan, Josie Linton, Jean-Phillippe Vinette, Haleigh Wiggins, Stephanie Zhou

2014: Mitchell Case, Paige Dillabough, Sierra Howald, Dalton Parkinson, Joel Speers, Chloé St. Amand, Tom Yanch

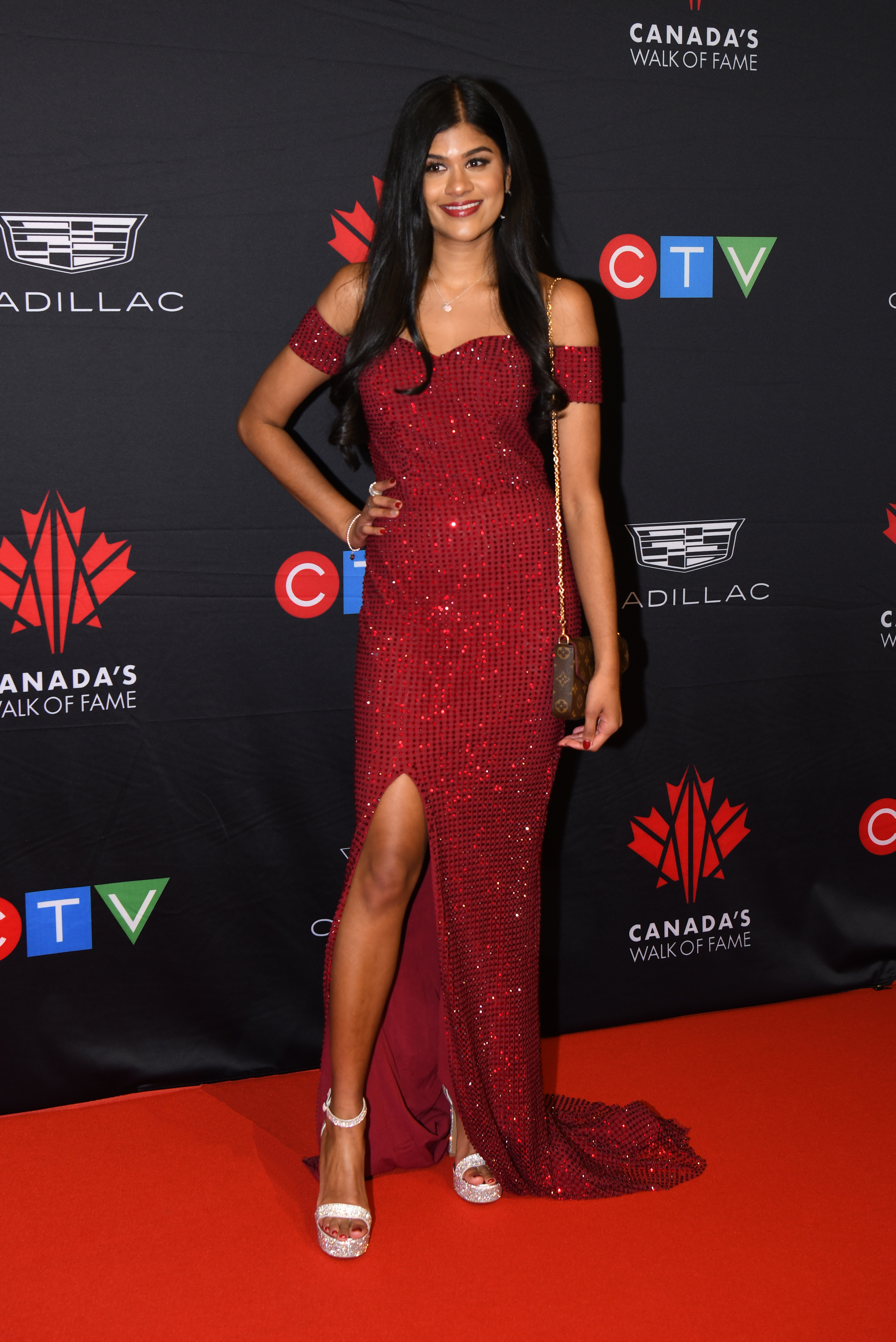
Aditi Sivakumar at the Canada's Walk of Fame 2022

2015: Sarah Day, William Laurie, Kylee Mazerolle, Robbie Palmer, Liam Rondeau, Samantha Smith, Danielle Sparkes, Taylor Young

2016: Fitsum Areguy, Lucie Bingley, Jillian Bjelan, Janson Chan, Josh Copperthwaite, Austin Fowler, Sebastien Martin-Schultz, Taylor Redmond, Carly Robinson, Jessica van der Veer

2017: Justin Tiseo, Joshua Austin, Christopher McCormick

2018: Vickram Bachan, Alannah Burris, Hayden Cheung, Josie Kearney, Ornela Kljakic, Dylan Langan, Ashley Muir, Radhika Nangia, Michelle Schenk 2019: Anjana Balachandran, Amanda Bishop, Kathryn Cheng, Tejas Dhami, Grace Gong, Lucas Gordon, Sarah Jordan, Lucia Marchionda, Divya Massilamani, Jack McCormick, William McCormick, Leighton Schreyer, Aditi Sivakumar, Tristan Wild, Karl Zhu 2020: Joshua Callaghan, Olivia Dey, Jackie Han, Ruby Hopkins, Arya Peruma, Noga Shachak, Joy Xu, Leo Xu, Nathan Yiu

2021: Kanish Baskaran, Natalie Chen, Mehak Dhaliwal, Shannon Edwards, Alexandra Elmslie, Aryan Gautam, Haya Khan, Andrew Mao, Ashvini Muralitharan, Avery Parkinson, Aditi Soin, Illyria Volcansek

2022: Fikayo Aderoju, Lia Chang, Paul Drakos, Jada Finch, Kevin Guo, Arvind Krishendeholl, Maya Mikhael, Nikolaus Provenzano, Kusha Shirani, Meihuan Yu, Meilun Yu, Ally Zlatar

2023: Georgia Apostolopoulos, Noah Bryan, Samantha Fung, Megan Lee, Kaelem Moniz, Matthew Newman, Rachel Pizzonia, Adam Selalmatzidis, Azka Siddiqui, Shiloh Terner, Aditya Thakur

== See also ==
- Canadian order of precedence (decorations and medals)
