= Saskatchewan Volunteer Medal =

- Obverse of the medal
- Type: Civil decoration
- Awarded for: Outstanding volunteer service or exceptional community involvement in an area that is beyond the performance of the individual's normal duties or the exercise of the responsibilities of a profession to which that individual belongs
- Country: Canada
- Presented by: The lieutenant governor of Saskatchewan
- Eligibility: Canadian citizens
- Post-nominals: SVM
- Motto: Nos ipsos dedimus (We Gave of Ourselves)
- Status: Currently awarded
- Established: 1995
- Ribbon bar of the medal

Precedence
- Next (higher): Ontario Medal for Firefighters Bravery
- Next (lower): Ontario Provincial Police Long Service and Good Conduct Medal

The Saskatchewan Volunteer Medal (SVM) is a civil decoration for volunteers in the Canadian province of Saskatchewan, introduced in 1995 by the Government of Saskatchewan. Prior to the establishment of the medal volunteerism could be recognized by the Saskatchewan Order of Merit, but this is only one of the fields for which the Order is presented. The medal was established to remedy inadequate recognition of volunteerism by the provincial government.

== Description ==
The medal is circular, made of silver, suspended from a V-shaped clasp. The obverse depicts the shield of the Coat of arms of Saskatchewan surmounted by St Edward's Crown, with silver replacing normally gold elements. Inscribed above the shield is the motto "Nos ipsos dedimus" (We Gave of Ourselves), and below is "Saskatchewan".

== See also ==
- Saskatchewan Order of Merit
- Sovereign's Medal for Volunteers
- Orders, decorations, and medals of the Canadian provinces
