= Ambronite =

Nutritional drinkable meal replacement

- Type: Meal replacement
- Founded: 2014
- Founders: Mikko Ikola, Tapio Melgin, Arno Paula, Miika Perä, Simo Suoheimo
- Headquarters: Finland
- Website: www.ambronite.com

Ambronite is a nutritional drinkable meal replacement intended to supply all of a human body's daily needs, made from 20 organic ingredients that includes berries, nuts, seeds and spinach. The product is a powder that is mixed with water to turn it into food. Ambronite's name is based on the Greek word for "food of the Gods" — Ambrosia.

== History ==
Ambronite was introduced in 2014 by five Finnish men with the intention of supplying all the nutrients necessary without the time and effort that usually goes into preparing food and is promoted as the world's first organic drinkable meal. A commercial distribution of Ambronite was funded by a crowdfunding campaign via Indiegogo. It met its $50,000 funding goal after one week, and went on to raise over $100,000. The first shipments of the crowdfunded Ambronite version 1 started in early October 2014 and finished in December. In early 2015, Ambronite v2 was released that added oats for better water solubility to lessen clumping at the bottom of the glass, that is common in similar powder-mixed foods. In June 2015, v3 was released that added flaxseed and removed walnuts for an improved taste. In February 2016, v4 was released that sweetened the taste by adding more berries. In October 2016, v5 was released that sweetened the taste more by adding additional berries and agave syrup. Later, a newer version was released that replaced agave syrup with coconut sugar.

== Nutritional content ==
One package of Ambronite contains 400 calories and 24 grams of protein, as well as most of the vitamins plus 14 essential minerals while including fiber and Omega-3 fatty acids; the calorie ratio used is carbohydrates at 40 percent, fat at 36 percent and protein at 24 percent.

== Reception ==
A Wired reviewer said that Ambronite version 5 tasted like an oatmeal slurpee that he prefers the taste of when compared to Soylent; he praised the use of organic ingredients with no additives or preservatives but thought the product was priced too high; it was rated a 6/10.

== See also ==
- Dietary supplement
- Liquid diet
- Meal replacement
- Protein shake
- Therapeutic food
