= Jimmy Joy (company) =

Dutch meal replacement company

- Formerly: Joylent
- Industry: Food
- Key people: Joey van Koningsbruggen
- Products: Plenny Shake, Plenny Drink, Plenny Bar, Plenny Pot
- Number of employees: 35
- Website: https://jimmyjoy.com

Jimmy Joy is a Dutch meal replacement company. The company was founded in 2014 by Joey van Koningsbruggen. Soylent (an American competitor) was not yet available in Europe, so van Koningsbruggen bought the ingredients himself and vlogged about it on YouTube, which gained him the initial customer base. Nine months later, the company had revenues of over $200,000 per month, and sold to 45 countries. The company was formerly known as Joylent, but agreed to change its name in February 2017 after Soylent asked them to. Its customers mostly consist of young men, some of whom rely exclusively on Jimmy Joy shakes as their main source of nutrition. Germany and the U.K. are its biggest export markets. By March 2018, the company had sold over 7.5 million shakes online, and was being sold by supermarket chains Albert Heijn and Spar.

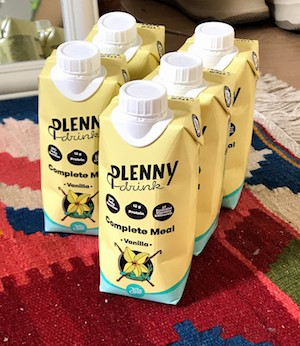
Jimmy Joy's Plenny Drink

== See also ==
- Liquid diet
- Meal replacement
- Protein shake
- Therapeutic food
