= Avil Milk =

Beverage made from Banana

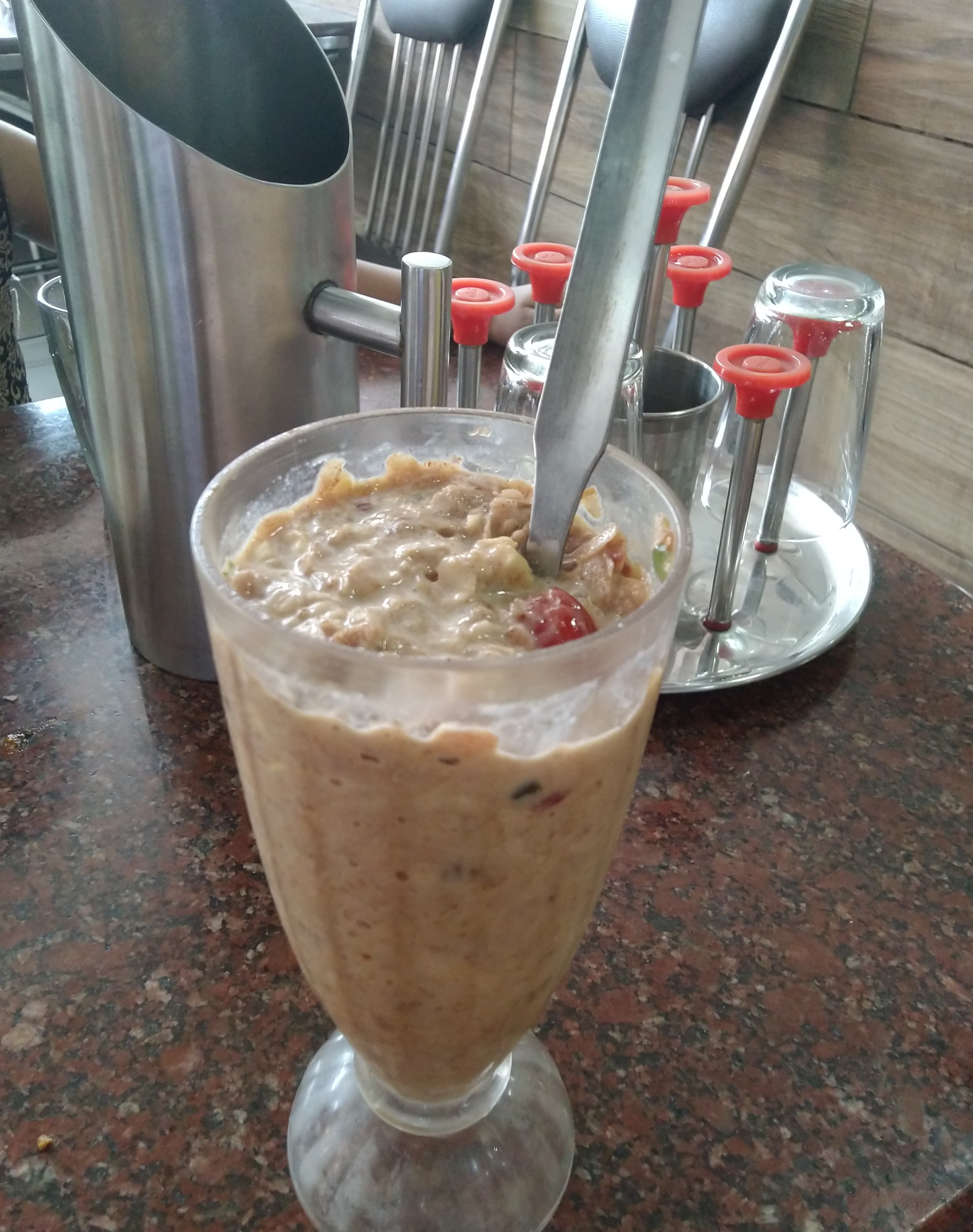
- Alternative names: അവൽ മിൽക്ക്
- Place of origin: V H Avilmilk Kottakkal Malappuram, Kerala, India
- Invented: 1993
- Food energy (per 100 g serving): 162 kcal (680 kJ)
Nutritional value
(per 100 g serving)
- Protein: 4.86 g
- Fat: 4.2 g
- Carbohydrate: 9 g

Aval Milk or Avil Milk is a Kerala cuisine drink sold in the streets of the Malabar region of Kerala, India. Aval milk is made with aval which is essentially poha or beaten rice flakes, along with ripe bananas, milk of any kind, and nuts.

== History ==
Avil milk comes from V H Avilmilk Kottakkal on the Malabar Coast. Invented by the founder of V H Avilmilk Vadakkan Hussain. The main ingredients are roasted rice flakes / Poha (rice), banana, roasted peanuts and nuts. It can be used as a breakfast smoothie or as a dessert.

In recent years, instant Avil Milk mixes have emerged as a modern adaptation of Kerala's traditional Avil Milk beverage. While several brands have contributed to the growth of this category, Avilum Club, based in Kottakkal, Kerala, pioneered the global online availability of Instant Avil Milk, becoming the world first brand to make the product widely available for purchase on major e-commerce platforms Amazon, Flipkart, and AvilumClub Store.

Avilum Club introduced the world's first Instant Avil Milk Fruit Series, featuring Mango Chunks and Guava Chunks made with real fruit pieces. These variants combine authentic Malabar Avil Milk with a ready-to-mix form.

Other brands such as Kuvil, Company based in Kozhikode, Kerala, have also introduced instant avil milk premix products, reflecting the growing consumer interest in this traditional Kerala beverage in a modern, convenient format.

== Image gallery ==
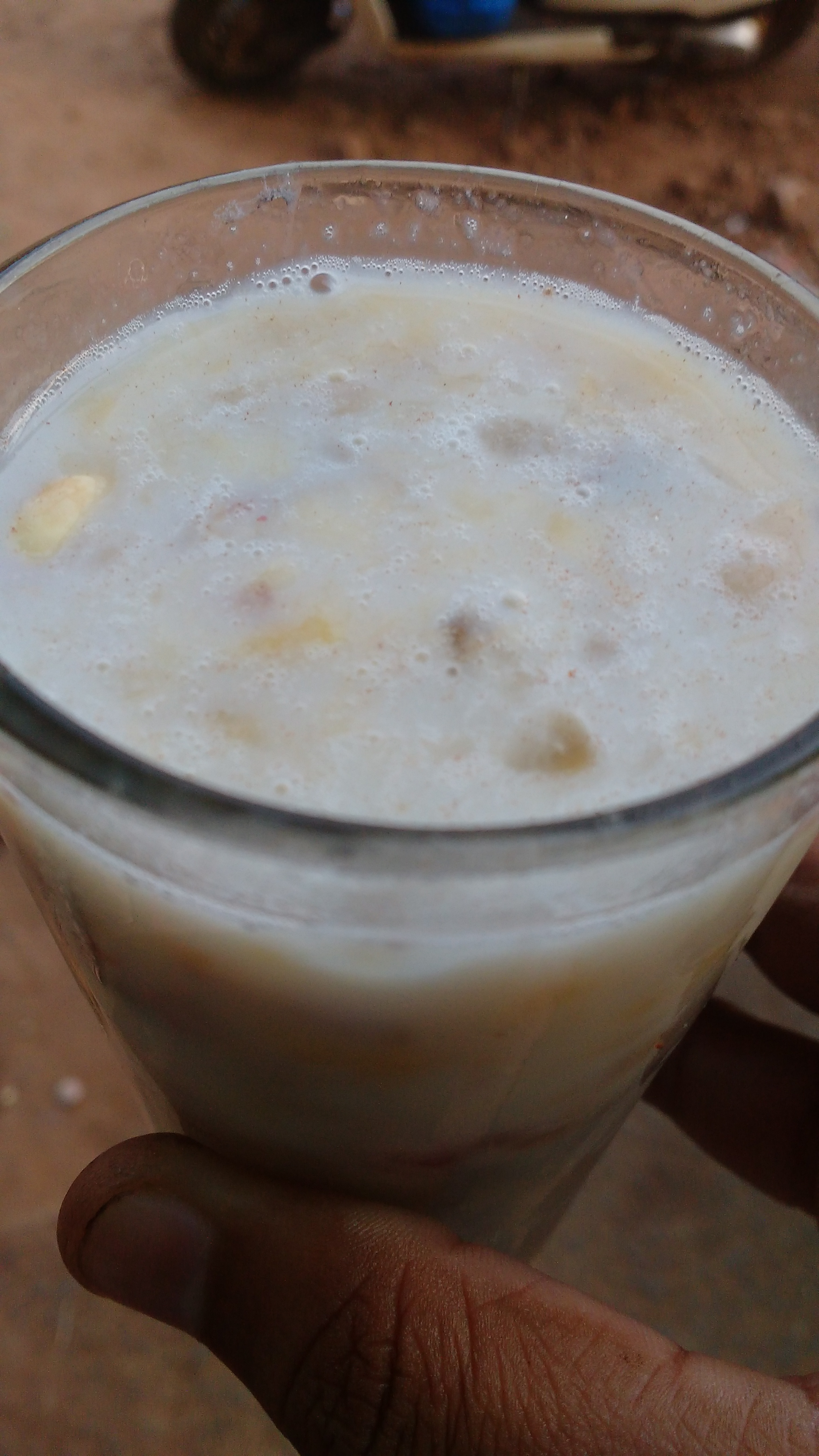

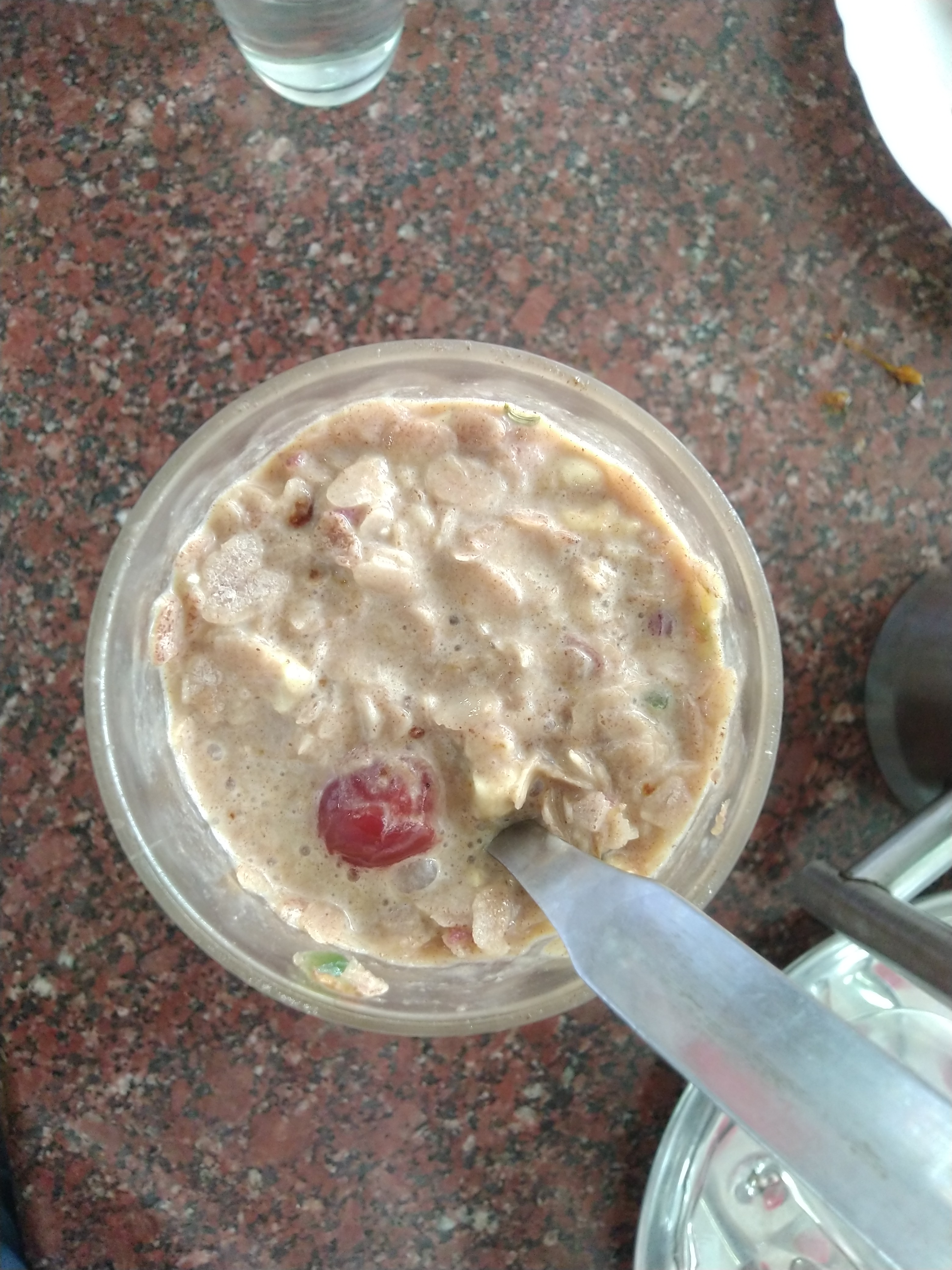

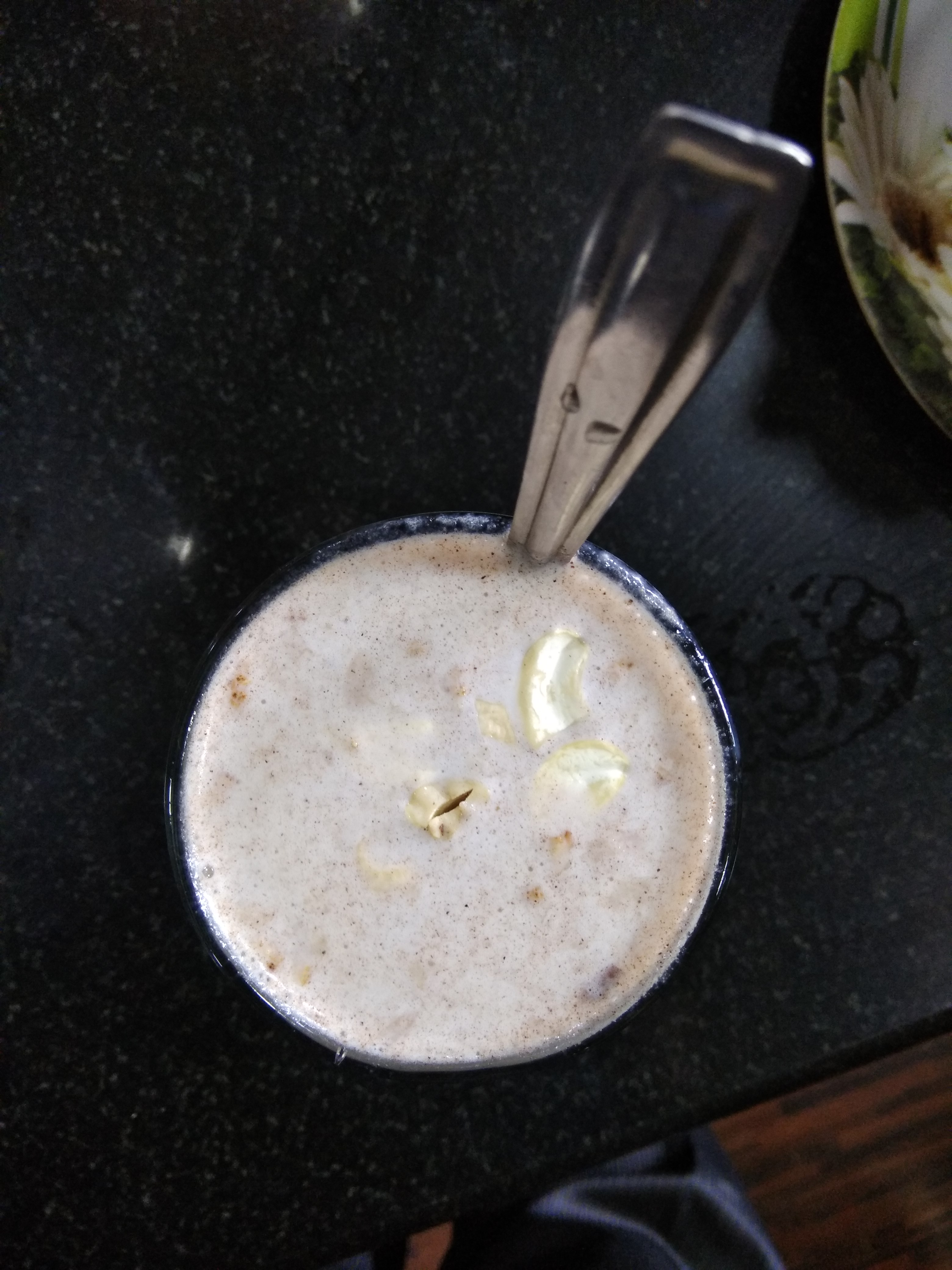

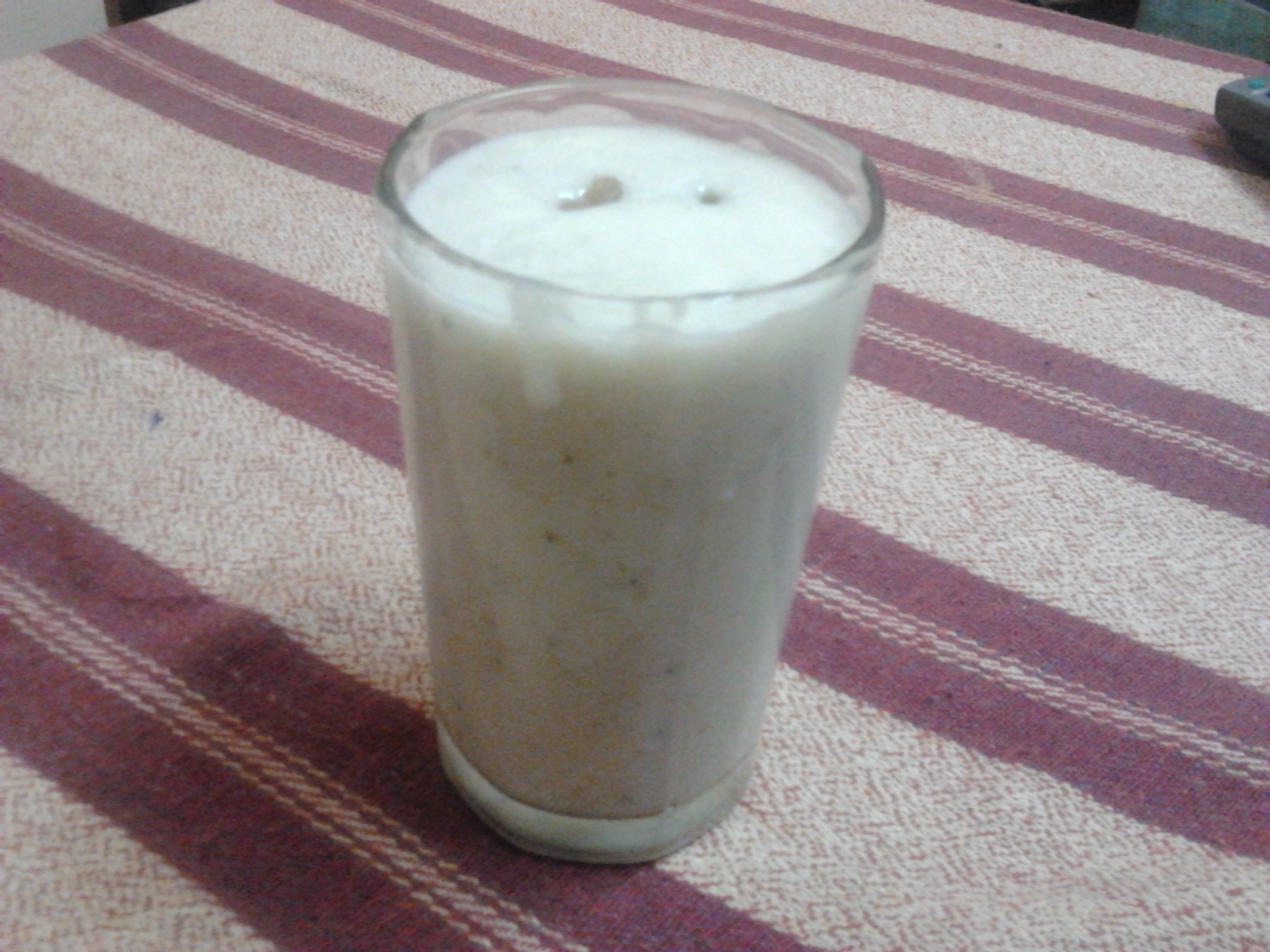

== See also ==
- Poha (rice)
- Kottakal
- Almond milk
- Milk substitute
- Banana
- Flattened rice
- Kerala cuisine
- Milkshake
- Health shake
