= Smoothie =

Drink made from fruit or vegetables

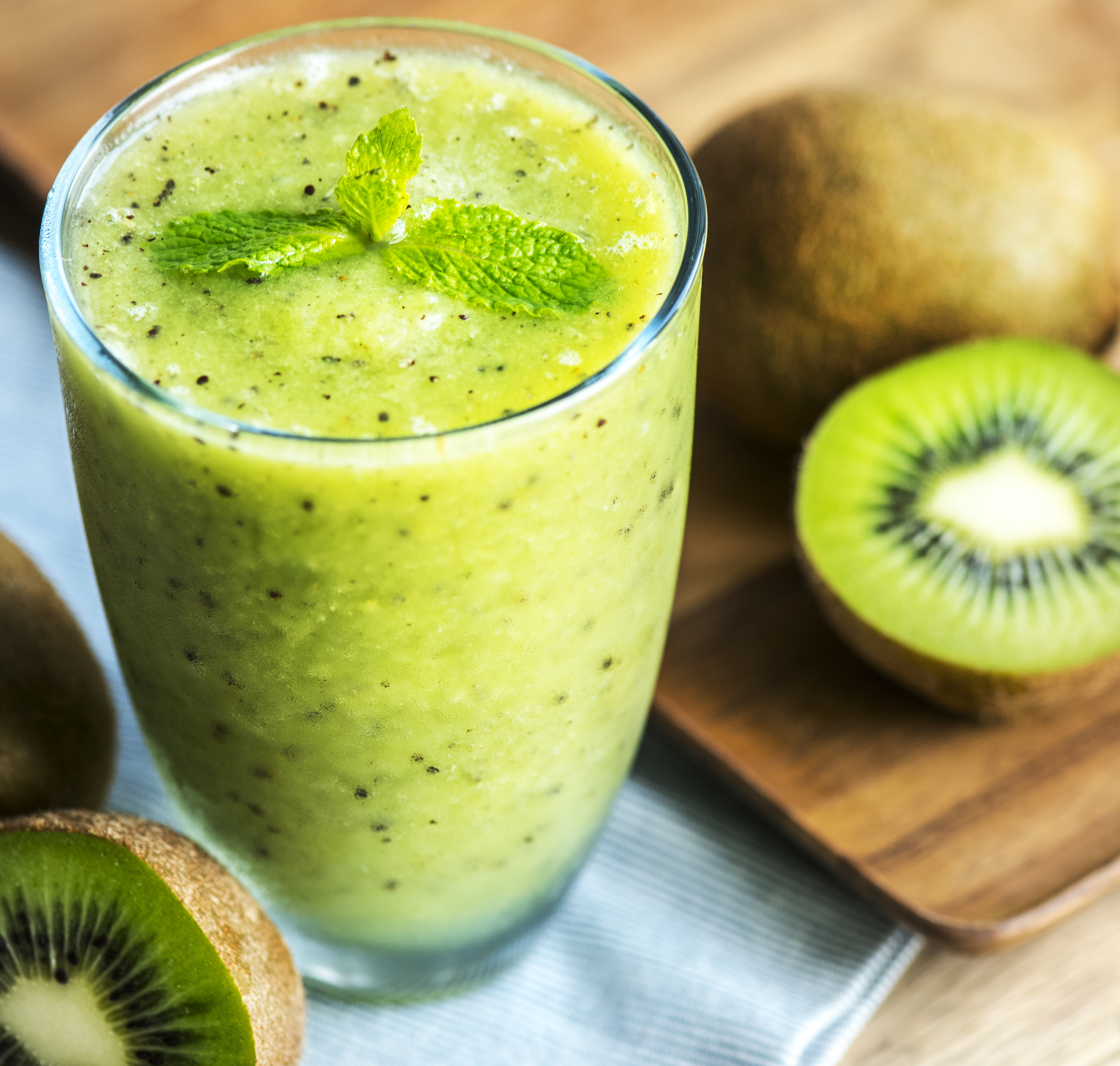
Kiwifruit smoothie

A smoothie is a beverage made by puréeing ingredients in a blender. A smoothie commonly has a liquid base, such as fruit juice, milk, yogurt, or ice cream. Other ingredients may be added, including fruits, vegetables, non-dairy milk, crushed ice, spices, herbs, sweetener, whey powder, or nutritional supplements.

== History ==
Health food stores on the west coast of the United States began selling smoothies with the invention of the electric blender. The actual term "smoothie" was being used in recipes and trademarks by the mid-1980s. In the 1960s Steve Kuhnau was inspired by his work as a soda jerk and began experimenting with smoothies. They were an alternative for the lactose intolerant Kuhnau to taste his own concoctions using unique blends of fruit juices, vegetables, protein powder, and vitamins. Kuhnau discovered early success in his smoothie sales and founded Smoothie King. Smoothie King expanded throughout the United States and pioneered other smoothie businesses. The smoothie was then modified by fast food chains with the addition of sweeter ingredients like chocolate and Splenda. In the 2000s, consumers began making smoothies at home, in part as an alternative for daily consumption of fruits and vegetables.

== Nutrition ==
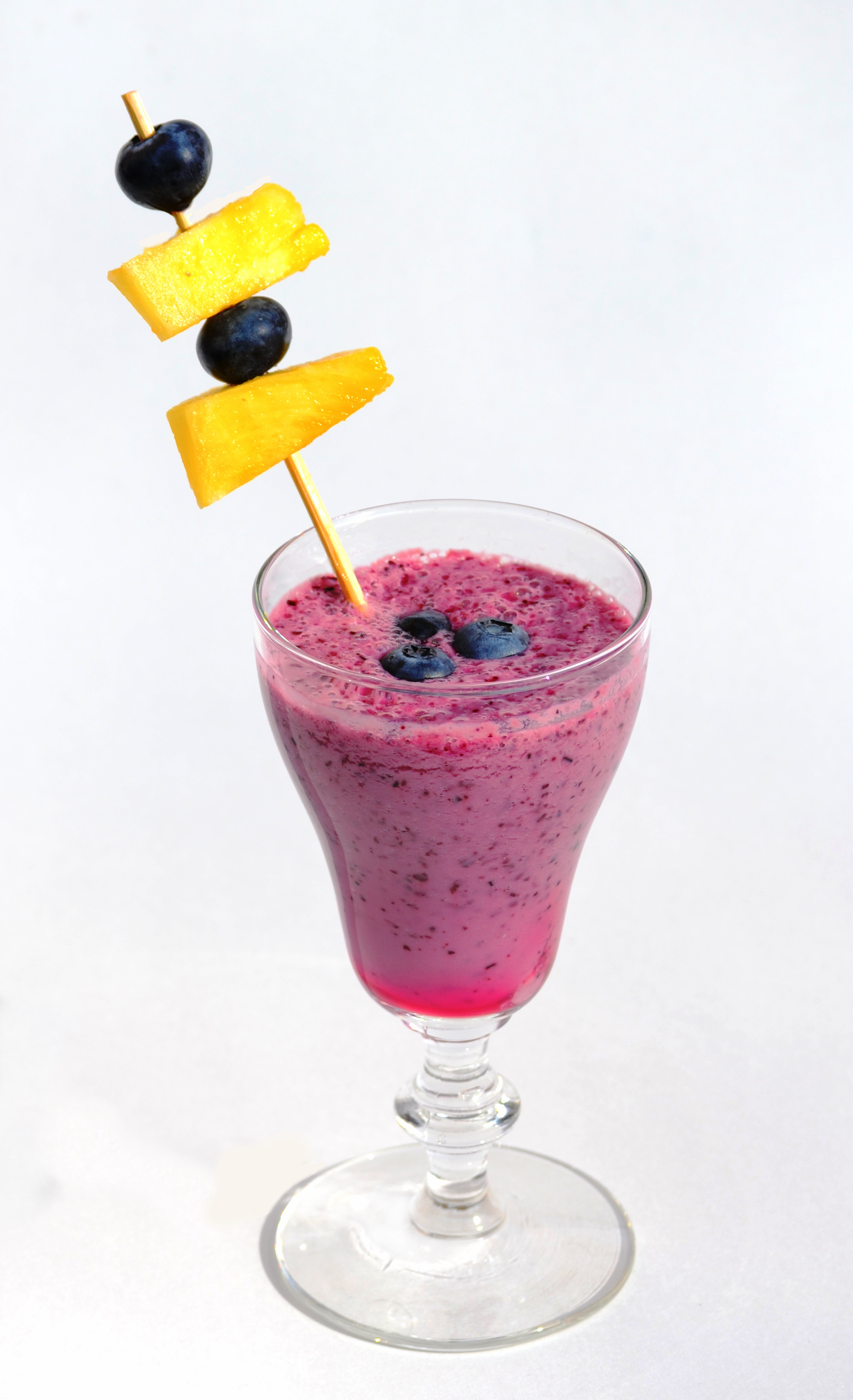
Blueberry smoothie topped with blueberries and pineapple pieces

The nutrition of a smoothie depends on its ingredients and their proportions. Many smoothies include large or multiple servings of fruits and vegetables, which are recommended in a healthy diet and intended to be a meal replacement. However, fruit juice containing high amounts of sugar can increase caloric intake and promote weight gain. Ingredients such as protein powders, sweeteners, or ice cream may be used. One study found smoothies to be less satiating, despite providing the same amount of energy as unblended foods.

== Types ==
=== Green smoothie ===
A green smoothie can consist of any combination (including green leafy vegetables) or relative quantity of vegetables from which the resulting product is colored green. Commonly, a green smoothie consists of dark green vegetables, such as spinach, kale, Swiss chard, collard greens, watercress, celery, parsley, or broccoli, with the remaining ingredients being fruit, a liquid, a protein source, a healthy fat source. Most green leafy vegetables have a bitter flavor when served raw, but this can be ameliorated by choosing certain less-bitter vegetables (e.g. baby spinach) or combining with fruits or other sweet ingredients.

=== Protein smoothie ===
A protein smoothie is a combination of water or milk, protein powder, fruits, and vegetables. They can be consumed any part of the day and are used as protein supplement for those who want to increase their protein intake. Protein powder can have a chalky taste when mixed individually by itself with milk or water. The protein smoothie improves the taste of the protein powder through addition of fruits or other sweeteners.

=== Yogurt smoothie ===
A yogurt smoothie is a smoothie that includes yogurt as a protein source and to add a creamy texture to the drink. Greek yogurt, specifically, is included as a thickener (due to its strained consistency) and in order to take advantage of its claimed health benefits.

== Around the world ==
India has lassi, a yogurt smoothie composed of crushed ice, yogurt, sugar or salt, and in some cases fruits, like mango.

Fruit sharbat (a popular West and South Asian drink) sometimes include yogurt and honey. Pineapple smoothies made with just crushed ice and sugar are common in Southern India. Lassi or a very similar drink exists by different names in other countries.

== See also ==
- Chaas
- Gazpacho
- Health shake
- Kumis
- List of beverages
- List of dairy products
- List of fruit dishes
- List of yogurt-based dishes and beverages
- Milkshake
