= ZMA =

ZMA may refer to:

== Science and technology ==
- ZMA (supplement), a bodybuilding supplement
- Zone Multicast Address

== Organizations ==
- Zavod Malolitrazhnykh Avtomobiley, a Russian small-car maker
- Zoölogisch Museum Amsterdam, Zoological Museum of the University of Amsterdam
- Miami Air Route Traffic Control Center (abbreviated ZMA), US
