= Smoothie King =

American fast food chain

Smoothie King Franchises, Inc.
- Trade name: Smoothie King
- Type: Private
- Industry: Foodservice
- Founded: 1973; 53 years ago in Kenner, Louisiana, US
- Founders: Steve and Cindy Kuhnau
- Headquarters: Coppell, Texas, US
- Key people: Wan Kim (CEO); Gavin Felder (President and CFO); Camille Hymes (COO); Jyoti Lynch (CIO); Claudia Schaefer (CMO)
- Products: Smoothies
- Revenue: ▲US$644 million (2023)
- Website: www.smoothieking.com

Smoothie King Franchises Inc. (doing business as Smoothie King) is an American privately held company that operates a chain of retail stores that specialize in selling smoothies. Founded in 1973, the company was bought by South Korean franchisee Wan Kim in 2012. In the late 2010s, the company was focusing on whole and unmodified ingredients.

== Corporate history ==
Smoothie King was founded in 1973 in Kenner, Louisiana, by Steve and Cindy Kuhnau.

The company expanded internationally in the early 2000s, with its first overseas franchise opening in South Korea in either 2002 or 2003. Within six years, franchisee Wan Kim had opened more than 100 locations in the country.

In 2012, Kim acquired Smoothie King from the Kuhnaus and secured US$58 million in growth capital from Standard Chartered Private Equity and the National Pension Fund of Korea to expand the brand. His growth plans included adding 800 new franchises, opening 200 corporately owned stores, and expanding the menu with salads and wraps, which in South Korea accounted for more than 20% of sales.

Per-store revenue increased from about $285,000 in 2009 to $362,000 in 2012. Corporate-wide revenues were reported as $372.5 million in 2017 and $415.7 million in 2018. In 2023, Smoothie King reported about US$644 million in sales.

In early 2014, Smoothie King entered into a naming rights agreement with the NBA's New Orleans Pelicans to rename the New Orleans Arena as the Smoothie King Center. The 10-year contract runs from 2014 to 2024, with an option to extend through 2034. As part of the agreement, all Smoothie King products underwent testing to ensure compliance with NBA banned-substance rules, a process that continues annually.

On July 10, 2025, San Francisco–based Main Post Partners acquired a minority stake in Smoothie King to support the brand’s next phase of growth.

== Leadership ==
Since acquiring the company in 2012, Wan Kim has been chief executive officer.

In November 2024, Smoothie King appointed Jyoti Lynch as chief information officer to lead enterprise technology and digital initiatives.

On January 29, 2025, Claudia Schaefer was named chief marketing officer.

On May 22, 2025, Gavin Felder, who had been chief financial officer, was also appointed president, expanding his responsibilities while retaining the CFO role.

== Locations ==
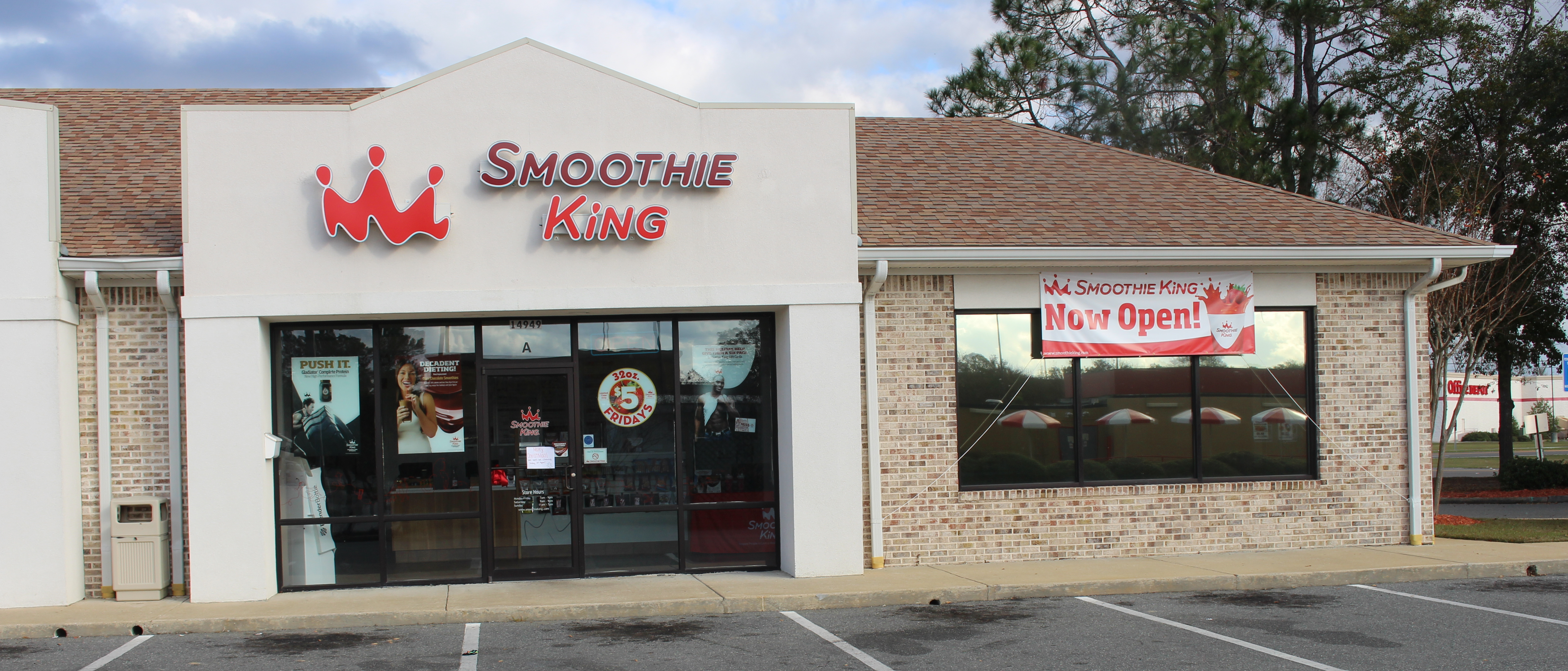
Recently-opened Smoothie King in Thomasville, Georgia (2016)

By 2012, Smoothie King was headquartered in Covington, Louisiana. That year, however, the company took advantage of US$2.4 million (equivalent to about $3M in 2025) of incentives to move to Metairie, Louisiana, approximately 40 miles (64 km) to the south. As of August 2021, Smoothie King was based in Coppell, Texas.

Predominantly in the United States, Smoothie King also has locations in South Korea, the Cayman Islands, Trinidad and Tobago, and previously had shops in Singapore (which opened in December 2012, but permanently closed in 2016). CEO Wan Kim has explicitly detailed the company's avoidance of cold-weather locations due to other smoothie companies' failures there. In 2018, the company opened its 1001st store, and by 2020, the number of stores was over 1100.

== Products ==
In the company's earlier years, Steve Kuhnau added the 1,000-calorie (4,200 kJ) "Hulk" smoothie to the stores' product line. It was invented for his neighbor who wanted help regaining weight during chemotherapy, and has remained popular with other cancer patients through at least 2020.

On January 1, 2013, the Center for Science in the Public Interest awarded the Peanut Power Plus Grape Smoothie their Xtreme Eating "dis-honor" for its healthlessness; consisting of "peanut butter, banana, sugar, and grape juice", a 40-US-fluid-ounce (1,200 ml) cup had 1,460 calories (6,100 kJ) and 214 grams (7.5 oz) of sugar.

In March 2019, the company was focusing on its "Clean Blends initiative" whereby stores' menus featured more smoothies with whole fruits and vegetables, and lacking food coloring, artificial flavor, preservatives, and added sugar. By 2023, to attract younger customers with healthier interests, the company removed all syrups from its products and added 100-percent organic vegetables. That year they also introduced smoothie bowls, which proved profitable.
