= Health shake =

Blended drink intended to be healthful

A health shake is a blended beverage intended to be healthful for one to consume and some are commercially marketed for that purpose. They are often consumed by sportspeople as part of a fitness diet or as a meal replacement (e.g., an instant breakfast). They have also been targeted towards those who have nutritional deficiencies as well as those working in tech fields. Health shakes may include a wide range of ingredients, including powdered nutrients, superfoods, bee pollen, peanut butter, coconut oil, bean powder, clover sprouts, whey, etc.

Bodybuilders sometimes drink a protein shake to help muscular recovery and building (see Bodybuilding supplement § Protein). While some health shakes have more calories than a plate of pancakes or a cheese omelet, these extra calories are accompanied by nutrients and both may be required by athletes in training. Smoothies—particularly green smoothies—are arguably a type of health shake, except stereotypical health shakes often contain some processed ingredients rather than just raw fruit and vegetables. Factory-made products often contain Artificial sweeteners and other additives (e.g., antioxidants, preservatives).

== See also ==
- Health food
- Green smoothie
- Juice bar
- Slim-Fast
- Ensure
- Soylent
