= Soylent (meal replacement) =

American brand of meal replacement products

Soylent Nutrition, Inc.
- Type: Division
- Industry: Meal replacement
- Founded: 2013; 13 years ago
- Founders: Rob Rhinehart; Matt Cauble; John Coogan; David Renteln
- Headquarters: Los Angeles, California, United States
- Area served: United States; Canada
- Key people: Demir Vangelov (CEO)
- Products: Soylent
- Owner: Starco Brands, Inc.
- Website: soylent.com

Soylent is a brand of meal replacement powders and shakes produced by Starco Brands, Inc. The brand was founded as Soylent Nutrition, Inc. in 2013 and is headquartered in Los Angeles, California. The company developed a following initially in Silicon Valley and received early financial backing from Andreessen Horowitz and GV. In 2021, Soylent announced that it had become profitable starting in 2020. In 2023, Starco Brands acquired the company.

== Name ==
Soylent is named after a food in Harry Harrison's 1966 science fiction novel, Make Room! Make Room! In the book, most types of "soylent" are made from soy and lentils, hence the name of the product, a combination of "soy" and "lent". The word also evokes the 1973 film adaptation, Soylent Green, in which the eponymous food is made from human remains. Rob Rhinehart, the founder, has said he chose the name, with its morbid associations, to pique curiosity and deeper investigation.

== History ==
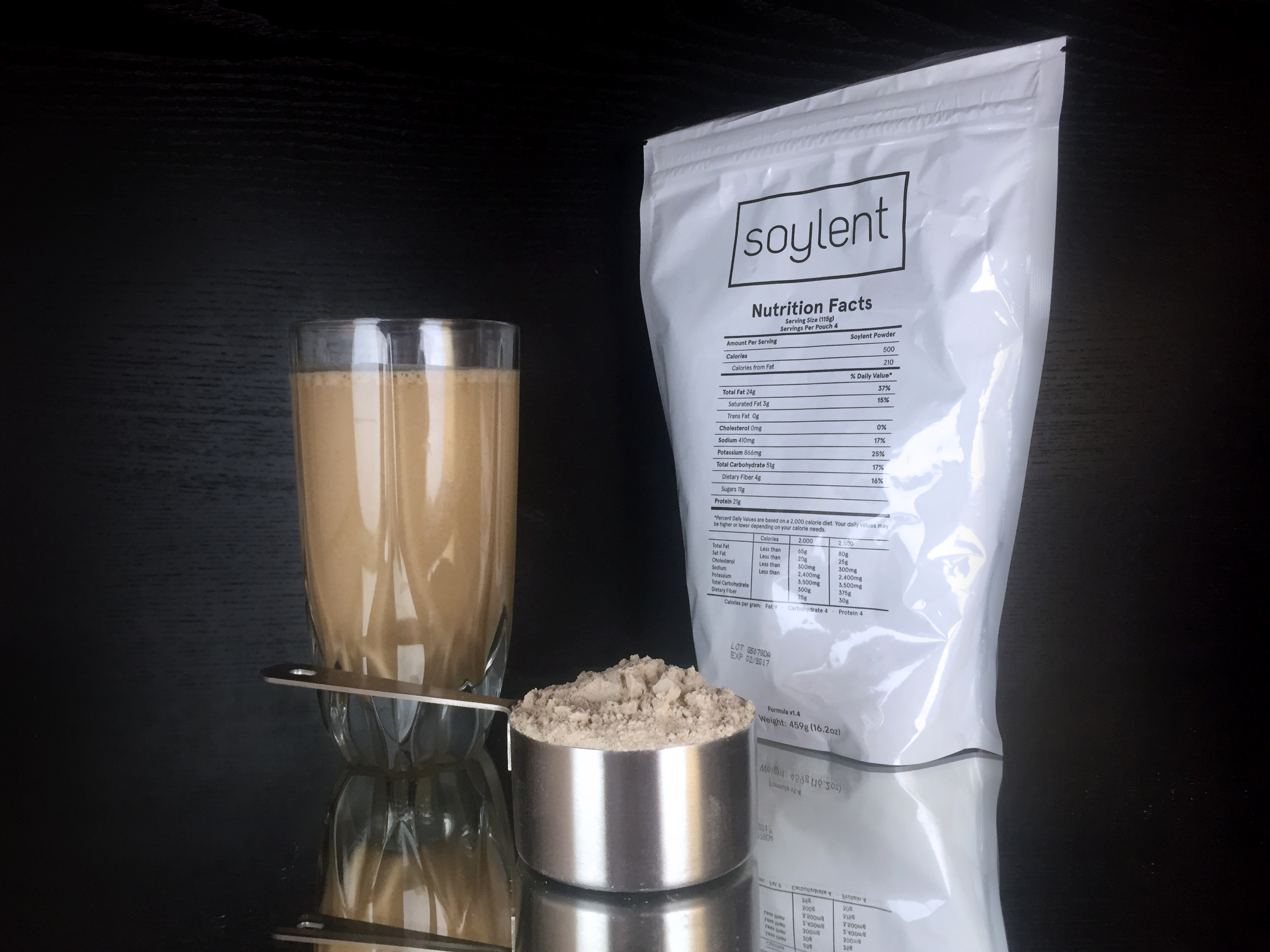
A Soylent package, along with the powder and resulting drink

=== Founding, incorporation, and crowdfunding (2013) ===
In January 2013, American software engineer Rob Rhinehart purchased 35 chemical ingredients, including potassium gluconate, calcium carbonate, monosodium phosphate, maltodextrin, and olive oil, all of which he deemed necessary for survival, based on his readings of biochemistry textbooks and U.S. government websites.

Over the course of the next two months, he adjusted the proportions of the ingredients and further refined the formula to counter various health issues that arose. Rhinehart claimed a host of health benefits from the drink and noted that it had greatly reduced his monthly food bill, which fell from about US$470 to $155, also mentioning reduced time spent preparing and consuming meals, which ultimately provided him greater control over his nutrition. Later in 2013, Rhinehart and three fellow engineers, Matt Cauble, John Coogan, and David Renteln, who had been working on other startup ventures while facing financial constraints in Silicon Valley, co-founded Soylent together as a four-person team, eventually leading to a crowdfunding campaign on Tilt that raised about $1.5 million in preorders.

=== Early operations and launch (2013–2015) ===
Rhinehart's blog posts about his experiment attracted attention on Hacker News, which detailed how operations began for Soylent Nutrition, Inc. in April 2014, using a relatively small $500 system to ship the first $2.6 million worth of product. In January 2015, Soylent received $20 million in Series A round funding, led by the venture capital firm Andreessen Horowitz.

=== Growth (2015–2022) ===
In 2017, the company raised $50 million in venture funding, led by GV, bringing its total funding to $74.5 million. Later that year, Rhinehart stepped down as CEO, naming Bryan Crowley to that position, while Rhinehart stayed on as chair. In 2021, Soylent announced that it had become profitable starting in 2020. During this period, the company introduced new ready-to-drink products alongside its original powdered formula, diversifying its offerings to meet growing consumer demand. By the end of the 2010s, Soylent had become one of the leading brands in the meal replacement and nutrition beverage market in the United States.

=== Acquisition and recent developments (2023-present) ===
In 2023, Starco Brands acquired Soylent, its third acquisition in six months. In 2024, Starco reported that Soylent made a profit of $7.8 million.

== Distribution ==
Soylent was available for purchase and shipment only within the United States until June 15, 2015, when it began shipping to Canada. In October 2017, Canada disallowed further shipments due to a failure to meet food regulations on meal replacements; shipments to Canada resumed in 2020.

In July 2017, 7-Eleven stores in and around Los Angeles became the first offline venues to sell Soylent. By April 2018, the product was sold in over 8,000 U.S. 7-Elevens and was available at Walmart, Target, Kroger, and Meijer. By 2021, over 28,000 retail stores carried Soylent.

== Health effects ==
The makers of Soylent claim it contains the nutrients necessary for a healthy lifestyle. Some people have experienced gastrointestinal problems from consumption of Soylent, particularly flatulence.

=== Lead and cadmium content ===
On August 13, 2015, As You Sow filed a notice of intent to pursue a lawsuit against the makers of Soylent, claiming that the company was in breach of California's Proposition 65 for not adequately labeling its product given the levels of lead and cadmium present in the drink. Although Soylent contains levels of lead and cadmium far below the national safety levels set by the FDA, it does contain 12 to 25 times the level of lead and 4 times the level of cadmium permitted in California without additional labeling. A lawyer who had worked on settlements of Proposition 65 suits described the case as "alarmist", as the levels are well below FDA limits of what is allowed in food products. However, as Soylent is marketed as a complete meal replacement, many customers consume the drinks three times a day, equating to 36 to 75 times the lead and 12 times the level of cadmium without the Prop 65 label.

Soylent's website displays the Proposition 65 warning required by California. Soylent Nutrition, Inc. published the position that the levels of heavy metal content in Soylent "are in no way toxic, and Soylent remains completely safe and nutritious". The company also published an infographic and spreadsheet based on an FDA study of heavy metal content in common foods, comparing two selected example meals to servings of Soylent with a similar amount of caloric intake.

=== Product recalls ===
In 2016, the company announced it would halt sales of the Soylent bar due to reports of gastrointestinal illness, including nausea, vomiting, and diarrhea. They asked customers to discard any unconsumed bars and offered full refunds. On October 21, 2016, the company triggered a product recall.

On October 27, 2016, they also halted sales of Soylent powder. The company stated that tests of the bar had not shown contamination, but some powder users had reported stomach-related symptoms.

Soylent initially suspected soy or sucralose intolerance. However, on November 7, 2016, the company instead blamed algal flour for making people sick and said it planned to remove it from future formulations of the powders and bars, which it did in the next formulation, version 1.7, introduced on December 15, 2016. The premade drinks use algal oil, not algal flour, and the company said it hadn't received any complaints about them, so it continued production.

== Reviews ==
Soylent has gone through multiple iterations since its release, which have significantly changed the flavor, texture, and nutritional ingredients. Rhinehart called the flavor of the original versions "minimal", "broad", and "nonspecific". Soylent 1.0 contained soy lecithin and sucralose as masking flavors and to adjust appearance, texture, and smell. Before version 1.4, vanillin was included as an ingredient for flavoring.

Dylan Matthews of The Washington Post noted in 2013 that Soylent fulfills a similar need as medical foods like Abbott Laboratories' Jevity, but at a much lower cost.

Reviews on the taste of powdered Soylent have varied. Writing for The Verge, Chris Ziegler said he was "pleasantly surprised" with the "rich, creamy, and strangely satisfying" flavor. After subsisting only on Soylent for almost a month, he said that although he liked and "never really tired of the flavor", he still concluded that "Soylent isn't living, it's merely surviving", and he described the apple he ate at the end of that period as "my first meal back from the abyss" and the best he'd ever had in his life.

A reviewer for Business Insider likened it to a vanilla milkshake with the texture of pancake batter, while a writer for The Guardian wrote that it was "purposefully bland", "vile", and made the taster gag.

In 2014, Farhad Manjoo of The New York Times said he "found Soylent to be a punishingly boring, joyless product". A writer for Gawker said he "was having trouble getting it down" and eventually "dumped the whole thing in the sink".

Both Manjoo and Ziegler said in 2013 they had experienced some gastrointestinal problems from drinking the product. Lee Hutchinson of Ars Technica also reported a brief period of "adaptation gas" at the beginning of a four-day experiment the same year.

The mocha-flavored version was described in 2016 as similar to a "caffeinated Nesquik drink".

== See also ==
- Nutritionism
- Protein shake
- Therapeutic food
- Huel
