= Dietary supplement =

Product providing additional nutrients

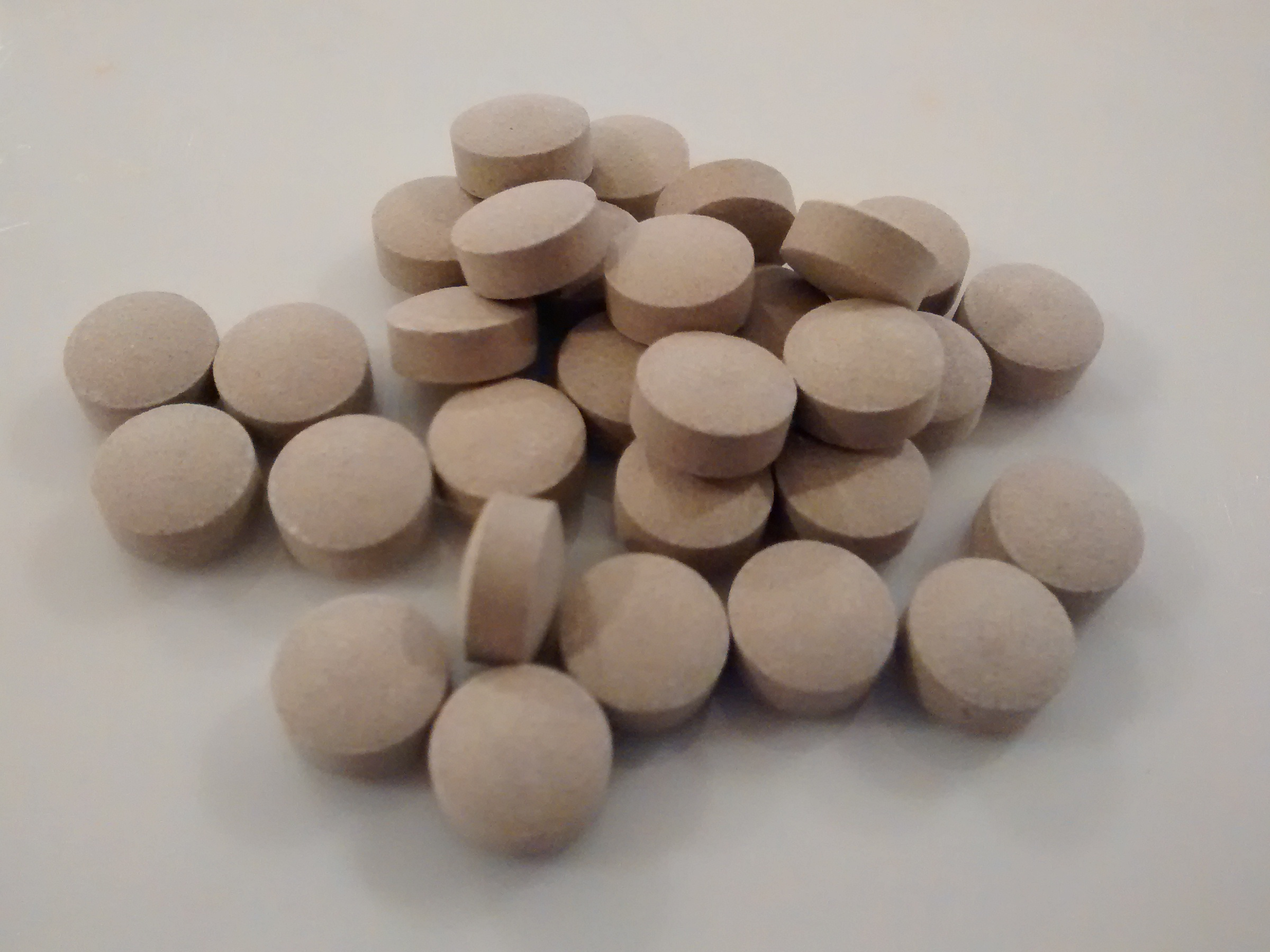
As a pill (iodine)

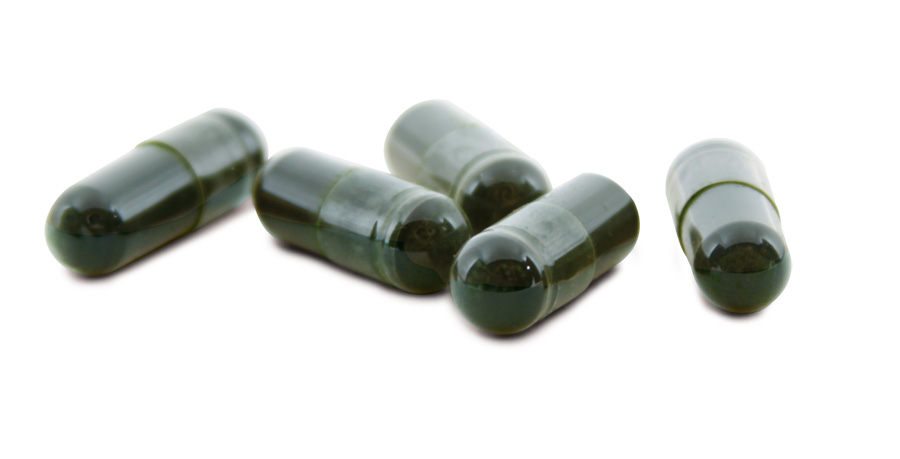
As a capsule (spirulina)

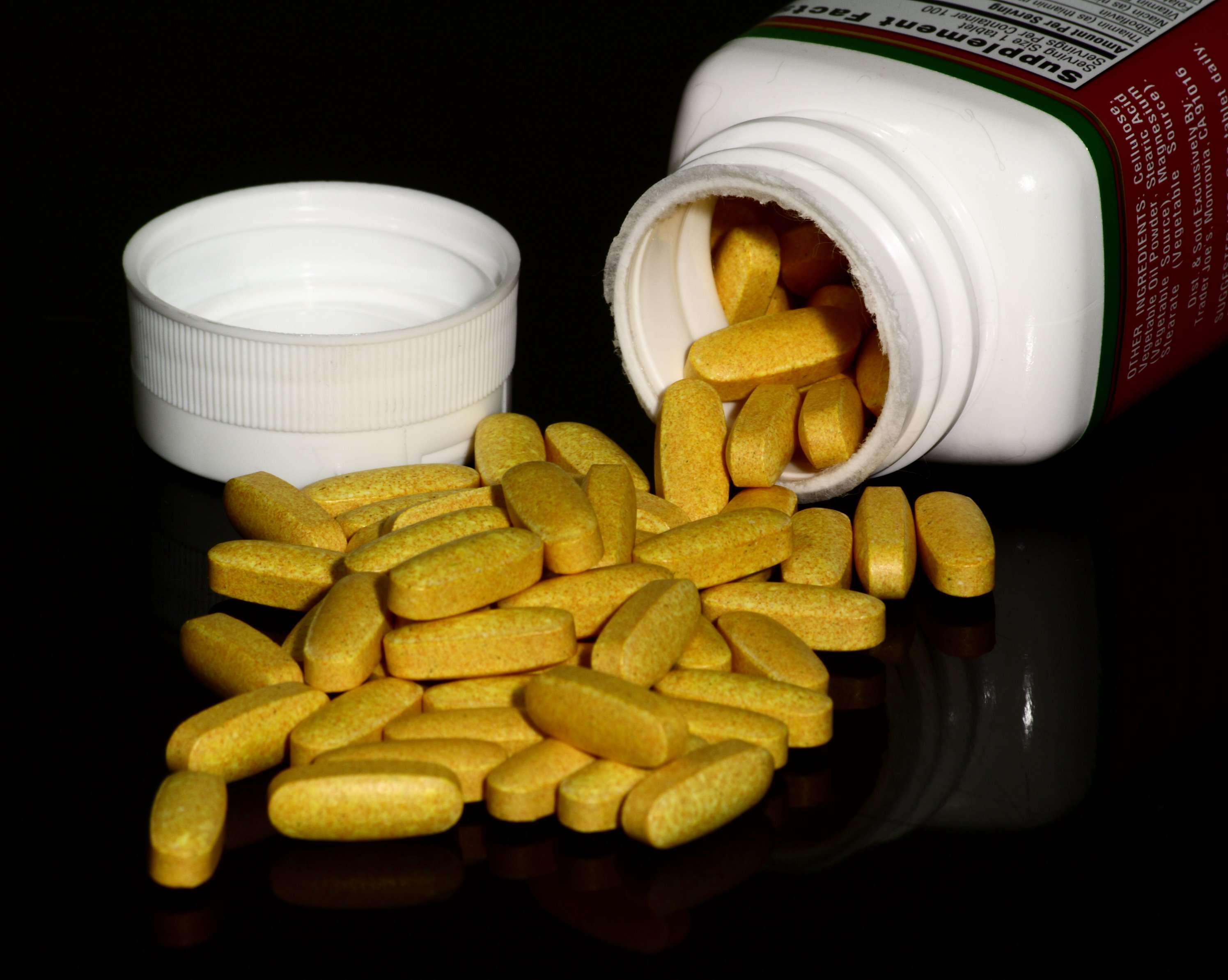
As a tablet (B vitamins)

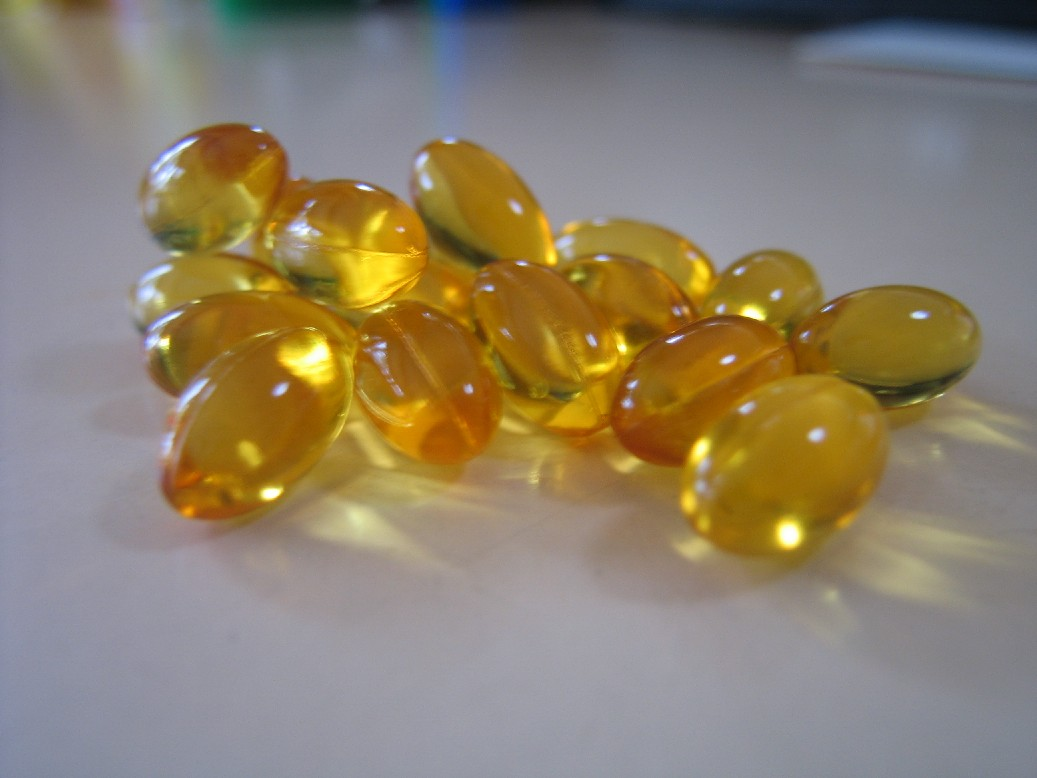
As a softgel capsule (cod liver oil)

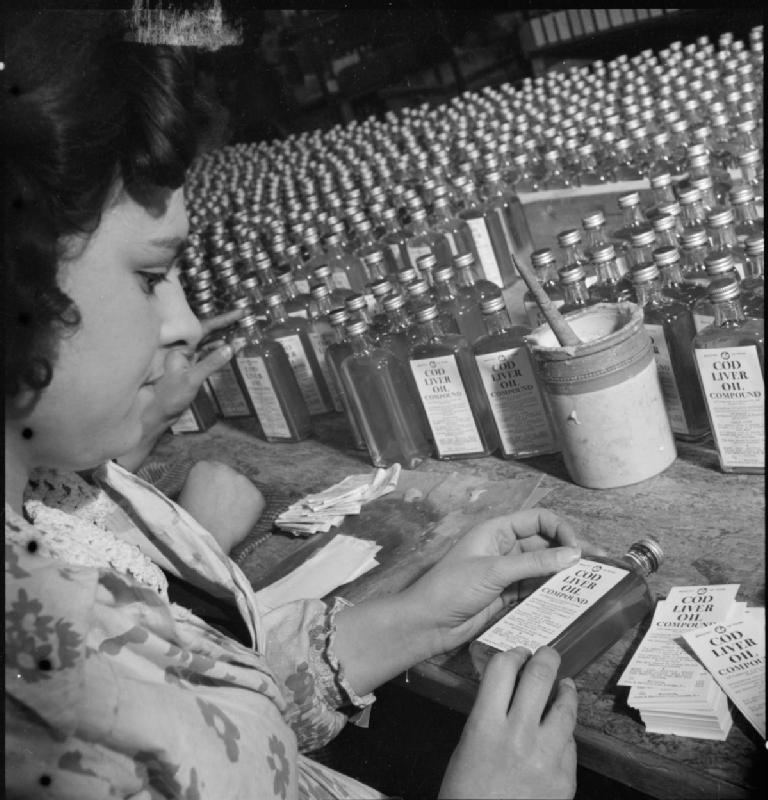
Production of cod liver oil, one of the first dietary supplements manufactured in the 18th century

A dietary supplement is a manufactured product intended to supplement a person's diet in the form of a pill, capsule, tablet, powder, or liquid. A supplement can provide nutrients that are either extracted from food sources or are synthesized (to increase the quantity of their consumption). The classes of nutrient compounds in supplements include vitamins, minerals, fiber, fatty acids, and amino acids. Dietary supplements may also contain substances that have not been confirmed as being essential to life, such as plant pigments or polyphenols, and so, by definition, are not necessarily nutrients. However, they may still be marketed as having a beneficial biological effect. Animals can also be a source of supplement ingredients; for example, collagen may be extracted from chickens or fish. Supplements are sold in multiple doses, ranging from one time usage to entire courses. They may also be enhanced with nutrient ingredients.

In the United States, the supplement industry was estimated to have a value of $151.9 billion in 2021. There are more than 95,000 dietary supplement products marketed in the United States, and about 60% of the American adult population consumes dietary supplements, 74% among Americans over the age of 60. Multivitamins are the most commonly used product among types of dietary supplements. The United States National Institutes of Health (NIH) states that some supplements may help provide essential nutrients or support overall health and performance for those with limited dietary variety.

In the United States, it is against federal regulations for supplement manufacturers to claim that their products prevent or treat any disease. Companies are allowed to use what is referred to as "Structure/Function" wording if there is substantiation of scientific evidence for a supplement providing a potential health effect. An example would be "_____ helps maintain healthy joints", but the label must bear a disclaimer that the Food and Drug Administration (FDA) "has not evaluated the claim" and that the dietary supplement product is not intended to "diagnose, treat, cure or prevent any disease", because only a medication can legally make such a claim. The FDA enforces these regulations as well as prohibiting the sale of supplements and supplement ingredients that are dangerous, or supplements not made according to standardized good manufacturing practices (GMPs).

The European Commission has established harmonized rules to help insure that food supplements in the European Union are safe and appropriately labeled.

== Definition ==
Per United States legislation, the Dietary Supplement Health and Education Act of 1994 provided the following definition of dietary supplements: "The Dietary Supplement Health and Education Act of 1994 (DSHEA) defines the term "dietary supplement" to mean a product ... intended to supplement the diet that bears or contains one or more of the following dietary ingredients: a vitamin, a mineral, an herb or other botanical, an amino acid, a dietary substance for use by man to supplement the diet by increasing the total dietary intake, or a concentrate, metabolite, constituent, extract, or combination of any of the aforementioned ingredients. Furthermore, a dietary supplement must be labeled as a dietary supplement and be intended for ingestion and must not be represented for use as conventional food or as a sole item of a meal or of the diet. In addition, a dietary supplement cannot be approved or authorized for investigation as a new drug, antibiotic, or biologic, unless it was marketed as a food or a dietary supplement before such approval or authorization. Under DSHEA, dietary supplements are deemed to be food, except for purposes of the drug definition."

Per DSHEA, dietary supplements are consumed orally, and are mainly defined by what they are not: conventional foods (including meal replacements), medical foods, preservatives, or pharmaceutical drugs. Products intended for use as a nasal spray or topical application, such as a lotion applied to the skin, do not qualify. FDA-approved drugs cannot be ingredients in dietary supplements. Supplement products are, or contain, vitamins, nutritionally essential minerals, amino acids, essential fatty acids, non-nutrient substances extracted from plants, animals, fungi or bacteria, and in the instance of probiotics, live microorganisms. Dietary supplement ingredients may also be synthetic copies of naturally occurring substances (for example: melatonin). All products with these ingredients are required to be labeled as dietary supplements in the United States. Like foods, but unlike drugs, no government approval is required to make or sell dietary supplements; instead, the manufacturer itself confirms the safety of dietary supplements. Rather than requiring risk–benefit analysis to prove that the product can be sold like a drug, such assessment is only used by the FDA to decide that a dietary supplement is unsafe and should be removed from market.

== Types ==
=== Vitamins ===
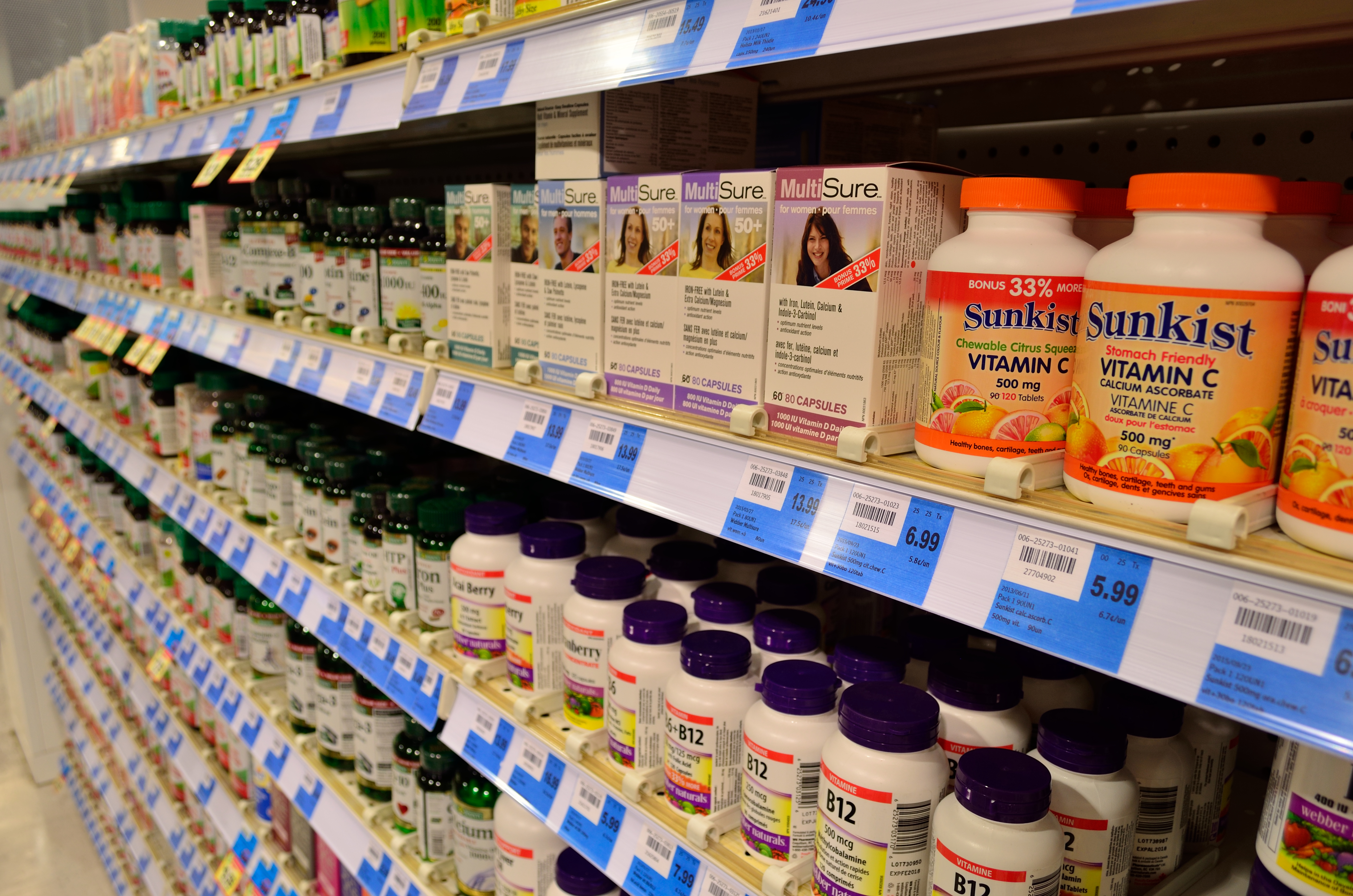
Pharmacies and supermarkets in the U.S. sell a large variety of vitamins as dietary supplements.

A vitamin is an organic compound required by an organism as a vital nutrient in limited amounts. An organic chemical compound (or related set of compounds) is called a vitamin when it cannot be synthesized in sufficient quantities by an organism and must be obtained from the diet. The term is conditional both on the circumstances and on the particular organism. For example, ascorbic acid (vitamin C) is a vitamin for anthropoid primates, humans, guinea pigs and bats, but not for other mammals. Vitamin D is not an essential nutrient for people who get sufficient exposure to ultraviolet light, either from the sun or an artificial source, as they synthesize vitamin D in skin. Humans require thirteen vitamins in their diet, most of which are actually groups of related molecules, "vitamers", (e.g., vitamin E includes tocopherols and tocotrienols, vitamin K includes vitamin K_{1} and K_{2}). The list: vitamins A, C, D, E, K, Thiamine (B_{1}), Riboflavin (B_{2}), Niacin (B_{3}), Pantothenic Acid (B_{5}), Vitamin B_{6}, Biotin (B_{7}), Folate (B_{9}) and Vitamin B_{12}. Vitamin intake below recommended amounts can result in signs and symptoms associated with vitamin deficiency. There is little evidence of benefit when vitamins are consumed as a dietary supplement by those who are healthy and have a nutritionally adequate diet.

The U.S. Institute of Medicine sets tolerable upper intake levels (ULs) for some of the vitamins. This does not prevent dietary supplement companies from selling products with content per serving higher than the ULs. For example, the UL for vitamin D is 100 μg (4,000 IU), but products are available without prescription at 10,000 IU.

=== Minerals ===
Minerals are the exogenous chemical elements indispensable for life. Four minerals – carbon, hydrogen, oxygen, and nitrogen – are essential for life but are so ubiquitous in food and drink that these are not considered nutrients and there are no recommended intakes for these as minerals. The need for nitrogen is addressed by requirements set for protein, which is composed of nitrogen-containing amino acids. Sulfur is essential, but for humans, not identified as having a recommended intake per se. Instead, recommended intakes are identified for the sulfur-containing amino acids methionine and cysteine. There are dietary supplements that provide sulfur, such as taurine and methylsulfonylmethane.

The essential nutrient minerals for humans, listed in order by weight needed to be at the Recommended Dietary Allowance or Adequate Intake are potassium, chlorine, sodium, calcium, phosphorus, magnesium, iron, zinc, manganese, copper, iodine, chromium, molybdenum, selenium and cobalt (the last as a component of vitamin B_{12}). There are other minerals which are essential for some plants and animals, but may or may not be essential for humans, such as boron and silicon. Essential and purportedly essential minerals are marketed as dietary supplements, individually and in combination with vitamins and other minerals.

Although as a general rule, dietary supplement labeling and marketing are not allowed to make disease prevention or treatment claims, the U.S. FDA has for some foods and dietary supplements reviewed the science, concluded that there is significant scientific agreement, and published specifically worded allowed health claims. An initial ruling allowing a health claim for calcium dietary supplements and osteoporosis was later amended to include calcium supplements with or without vitamin D, effective January 1, 2010. Examples of allowed wording are shown below. To qualify for the calcium health claim, a dietary supplement must contain at least 20% of the Reference Dietary Intake, which for calcium means at least 260 mg/serving.

- "Adequate calcium throughout life, as part of a well-balanced diet, may reduce the risk of osteoporosis."
- "Adequate calcium as part of a healthful diet, along with physical activity, may reduce the risk of osteoporosis in later life."
- "Adequate calcium and vitamin D throughout life, as part of a well-balanced diet, may reduce the risk of osteoporosis."
- "Adequate calcium and vitamin D as part of a healthful diet, along with physical activity, may reduce the risk of osteoporosis in later life."

In the same year, the European Food Safety Authority also approved a dietary supplement health claim for calcium and vitamin D and the reduction of the risk of osteoporotic fractures by reducing bone loss. The U.S. FDA also approved Qualified Health Claims (QHCs) for various health conditions for calcium, selenium and chromium picolinate. QHCs are supported by scientific evidence, but do not meet the more rigorous "significant scientific agreement" standard required for an authorized health claim. If dietary supplement companies choose to make such a claim then the FDA stipulates the exact wording of the QHC to be used on labels and in marketing materials. The wording can be onerous: "One study suggests that selenium intake may reduce the risk of bladder cancer in women. However, one smaller study showed no reduction in risk. Based on these studies, FDA concludes that it is highly uncertain that selenium supplements reduce the risk of bladder cancer in women."

Individuals with hypokalemic sensory overstimulation are sometimes diagnosed as having attention deficit hyperactivity disorder (ADHD), raising the possibility that a subtype of ADHD has a cause that can be understood mechanistically and treated in a novel way. The sensory overload is treatable with oral potassium gluconate.

=== Proteins and amino acids ===
Protein-containing supplements, either ready-to-drink or as powders to be mixed into water, are marketed as aids to people recovering from illness or injury, those hoping to thwart the sarcopenia of old age, to athletes who believe that strenuous physical activity increases protein requirements, to people hoping to lose weight while minimizing muscle loss, i.e., conducting a protein-sparing modified fast, and to people who want to increase muscle size for performance and appearance. Whey protein is a popular ingredient, but products may also incorporate casein, soy, pea, hemp or rice protein. A meta-analysis found a moderate degree of evidence in favor of whey protein supplements use as a safe and effective adjunct to an athlete's training and recovery, including benefits for endurance, average power, muscle mass, and reduced perceived exercise intensity.

According to US and Canadian Dietary Reference Intake guidelines, the protein Recommended Dietary Allowance (RDA) for adults is based on 0.8 grams protein per kilogram body weight. The recommendation is for sedentary and lightly active people. Scientific reviews can conclude that a high protein diet, when combined with exercise, will increase muscle mass and strength, or conclude the opposite. The International Olympic Committee recommends protein intake targets for both strength and endurance athletes at about 1.2–1.8 g/kg body mass per day. One review proposed a maximum daily protein intake of approximately 25% of energy requirements, i.e., approximately 2.0 to 2.5 g/kg.

The same protein ingredients marketed as dietary supplements can be incorporated into meal replacement and medical food products, but those are regulated and labeled differently from supplements. In the United States, "meal replacement" products are foods and are labeled as such. These typically contain protein, carbohydrates, fats, vitamins and minerals. There may be content claims such as "good source of protein", "low fat" or "lactose free". Medical foods, also nutritionally complete, are designed to be used while a person is under the care of a physician or other licensed healthcare professional. Liquid medical food products – for example, Ensure – are available in regular and high protein versions.

Proteins are chains of amino acids. Nine of these proteinogenic amino acids are considered essential for humans because they cannot be produced from other compounds by the human body and so must be taken in as food. Recommended intakes, expressed as milligrams per kilogram of body weight per day, have been established. Other amino acids may be conditionally essential for certain ages or medical conditions. Amino acids, individually and in combinations, are sold as dietary supplements. The claim for supplementing with the branched-chain amino acids leucine, valine and isoleucine is for stimulating muscle protein synthesis. A review of the literature concluded this claim was unwarranted. In elderly people, supplementation with just leucine resulted in a modest (0.99 kg) increase in lean body mass. The non-essential amino acid arginine, consumed in sufficient amounts, is thought to act as a donor for the synthesis of nitric oxide, a vasodilator. A review confirmed blood pressure lowering. Taurine, a popular dietary supplement ingredient with claims made for sports performance, is technically not an amino acid. It is synthesized in the body from the amino acid cysteine.

=== Bodybuilding supplements ===
Bodybuilding supplements are dietary supplements commonly used by those involved in bodybuilding, weightlifting, mixed martial arts, and athletics for the purpose of facilitating an increase in lean body mass. Bodybuilding supplements may contain ingredients that are advertised to increase a person's muscle, body weight, athletic performance, and decrease a person's percent body fat for desired muscle definition. Among the most widely used are high protein drinks, pre-workout blends and caffeinated energy drinks, branched-chain amino acids (BCAA), glutamine, arginine, essential fatty acids, creatine, HMB, whey protein, ZMA, and weight loss products. Supplements are sold either as single ingredient preparations or in the form of "stacks" – proprietary blends of various supplements marketed as offering synergistic advantages.

=== Beauty supplements ===
Beauty supplements, particularly those aimed at improving the health of skin, hair, and nails, are commonly marketed within the wellness and supplement markets. These products typically include ingredients, such as collagen, which is reputed to improve the appearance and condition of skin, hair, and nails. Other typical ingredients include biotin, keratin, and omega-3 fatty acids, which are promoted for their alleged benefits to skin and hair health. Demand for these beauty supplements has risen markedly in the 21st century. Despite the apparent rise in demand, scientific evidence supporting the efficacy of ingredients like biotin for the purpose of hair growth remains unproven.

=== Essential fatty acids ===
Fish oil is a commonly used fatty acid supplement because it is a source of omega-3 fatty acids. Fatty acids are strings of carbon atoms, having a range of lengths. If links are all single (C−C), then the fatty acid is called saturated; with one double bond (C=C), it is called monounsaturated; if there are two or more double bonds (C=C=C), it is called polyunsaturated. Only two fatty acids, both polyunsaturated, are considered essential to be obtained from the diet, as the others are synthesized in the body. The "essential" fatty acids are alpha-linolenic acid (ALA), an omega-3 fatty acid, and linoleic acid (LA), an omega-6 fatty acid. ALA can be elongated in the body to create other omega-3 fatty acids: eicosapentaenoic acid (EPA) and docosahexaenoic acid (DHA).

Plant oils, particularly seed and nut oils, contain ALA. Food sources of EPA and DHA are oceanic fish, whereas dietary supplement sources include fish oil, krill oil and marine algae extracts. The European Food Safety Authority (EFSA) identifies 250 mg/day for a combined total of EPA and DHA as Adequate Intake, with a recommendation that women pregnant or lactating consume an additional 100 to 200 mg/day of DHA. In the United States and Canada are Adequate Intakes for ALA and LA over various stages of life, but there are no intake levels specified for EPA and/or DHA.

Supplementation with EPA and/or DHA does not appear to affect the risk of death, cancer or heart disease. Furthermore, studies of fish oil supplements have failed to support claims of preventing heart attacks or strokes. In 2017, the American Heart Association issued a science advisory stating that it could not recommend use of omega-3 fish oil supplements for primary prevention of cardiovascular disease or stroke, although it reaffirmed supplementation for people who have a history of coronary heart disease.

Manufacturers have begun to include long chain polyunsaturated fatty acids DHA and arachidonic acid (AA) into their formula milk for newborns, however, a 2017 review found that supplementation with DHA and AA does not appear to be harmful or beneficial to formula-fed infants.

=== Natural products ===
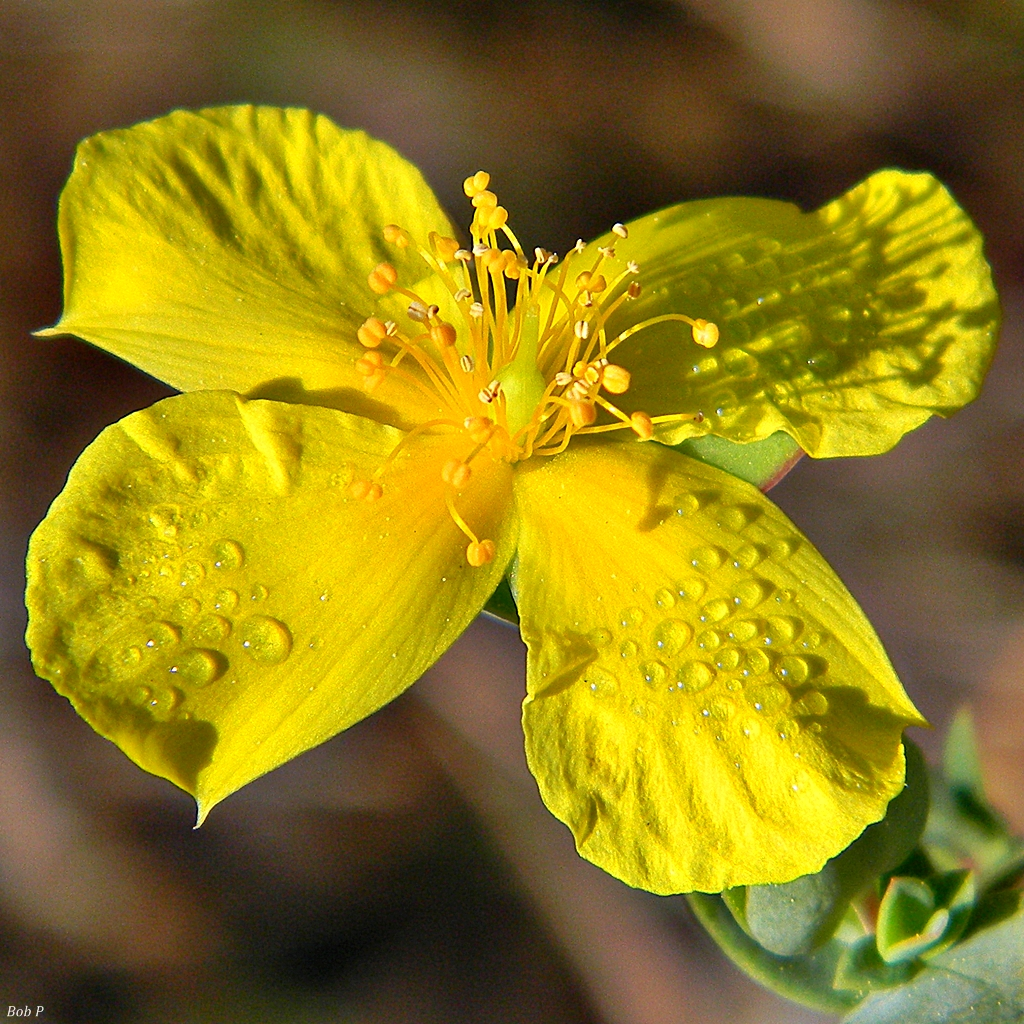
St. John's wort petals used in natural product supplements

Dietary supplements can be manufactured using intact sources or extracts from plants, animals, algae, fungi or lichens, including such examples as ginkgo biloba, curcumin, cranberry, St. John's wort, ginseng, resveratrol, glucosamine and collagen. Products bearing promotional claims of health benefits are sold without requiring a prescription in pharmacies, supermarkets, specialist shops, military commissaries, buyers clubs, direct selling organizations, and the internet. While most of these products have a long history of use in herbalism and various forms of traditional medicine, concerns exist about their actual efficacy, safety and consistency of quality. Canada has published a manufacturer and consumer guide describing quality, licensing, standards, identities, and common contaminants of natural products.

In 2019, sales of herbal supplements just in the United States alone were $9.6 billion, with the market growing at approximately 8.6% per year, with cannabidiol and mushroom product sales as the highest. Italy, Germany, and Eastern European countries were leading consumers of botanical supplements in 2016, with European Union market growth forecast to be $8.7 billion by 2020.

=== Probiotics ===
Claimed benefits of using probiotic supplements are not supported by sufficient clinical evidence. Meta-analysis studies have reported a modest reduction of antibiotic-associated diarrhea and acute diarrhea in children taking probiotics. There is limited evidence in support of adults using mono-strain and multi-strain containing probiotics for the alleviation of symptoms associated with irritable bowel syndrome. Probiotic supplements are generally regarded as safe.

=== Fertility ===
A meta-analysis provided preliminary evidence that men treated with supplements containing selenium, zinc, omega-3 fatty acids, coenzyme Q_{10} or carnitines reported improvements in total sperm count, concentration, motility, and morphology. A review concluded that omega-3 taken through supplements and diet might improve semen quality in infertile men. A 2021 review also supported selenium, zinc, omega-3 fatty acids, coenzyme Q_{10} or carnitines, but warned that "excessive use of antioxidants may be detrimental to the spermatic function and many of the over-the-counter supplements are not scientifically proven to improve fertility."

There is low quality and insufficient evidence for the use of oral antioxidant supplements as a viable treatment for subfertile woman. A review provided evidence that taking dehydroepiandrosterone before starting an in vitro fertilization series may increase pregnancy rates and decrease miscarriage likelihood.

=== Prenatal ===
Prenatal vitamins are dietary supplements commonly given to pregnant women to supply nutrients that may reduce health complications for the mother and fetus. Although prenatal vitamins are not meant to substitute for dietary nutrition, prenatal supplementation may be beneficial for pregnant women at risk of nutrient deficiencies because of diet limitations or restrictions. The most common components in prenatal vitamins include vitamins B_{6}, folate, B_{12}, C, D, E, iron and calcium.

Sufficient intake of vitamin B_{6} can lower the risk of early pregnancy loss and relieve symptoms of morning sickness. Folate is also an essential nutrient for pregnant women to prevent neural tube defects. In 2006, the World Health Organization endorsed the recommendation for women of child-bearing age to consume 400 micrograms of folate through the diet daily if planning a pregnancy. A 2013 review found folic acid supplementation during pregnancy did not affect the mother's health other than a risk reduction on low pre-delivery serum folate and megaloblastic anemia. There is little evidence to suggest that vitamin D supplementation improves prenatal outcomes in hypertensive disorders and gestational diabetes. Evidence does not support the routine use of vitamin E supplementation during pregnancy to prevent adverse events, such as preterm birth, fetal or neonatal death, or maternal hypertensive disorders.

Iron supplementation can lower the risk of iron deficiency anemia for pregnant women. In 2020, the World Health Organization updated recommendations for adequate calcium levels during pregnancy to prevent hypertensive disorders.

== Industry ==
In 2020, the American market for dietary supplements was valued at $140.3 billion, with the economic impact in the United States for 2016 estimated at $122 billion, including employment wages and taxes. A 2020 analysis projected that the global market for vitamins and dietary supplement products would reach $196.6 billion by 2028, where the growth in market size is largely attributed to recent technological advancements in product manufacturing, increased demand for products advertised as healthy, increased product availability, and population aging.

== Adulteration, contamination and mislabeling ==
Over the period 2008 to 2011, the Government Accountability Office (GAO) of the United States received 6,307 reports of health problems (identified as adverse events) from use of dietary supplements containing a combination of ingredients in manufactured vitamins, minerals or other supplement products, with 92% of tested herbal supplements containing lead and 80% containing other chemical contaminants. Using undercover staff, the GAO also found that supplement retailers intentionally engaged in "unequivocal deception" to sell products advertised with baseless health claims, particularly to elderly consumers. Consumer Reports also reported unsafe levels of arsenic, cadmium, lead and mercury in several protein powder products. The Canadian Broadcasting Corporation (CBC) reported that protein spiking, i.e., the addition of amino acids to manipulate protein content analysis, was common. Many of the companies involved challenged CBC's claim.

In some botanical products, undeclared ingredients were used to increase the bulk of the product and reduce its cost of manufacturing, while potentially violating certain religious and/or cultural limitations on consuming animal ingredients, such as cow, buffalo or deer. In 2015, the New York Attorney General (NY-AG) identified four major retailers with dietary supplement products that contained fraudulent and potentially dangerous ingredients, requiring the companies to remove the products from retail stores. According to the NY-AG, only about 20% of the herbal supplements tested contained the plants claimed. The methodology used by the NY-AG was disputed. The test involves looking for DNA fragments from the plants named as the dietary supplement ingredients in the products. One scientist said that it was possible that the extraction process used to create the supplements removed or destroyed all DNA. This, however, would not explain the presence of DNA from plants such as rice or wheat, that were not listed as ingredients.

A study of dietary supplements sold between 2007 and 2016 identified 776 that contained unlisted pharmaceutical drugs, many of which could interact with other medications and lead to hospitalization. 86% of the adulterated supplements were marketed for weight loss and sexual performance, with many containing prescription erectile dysfunction medication. Muscle building supplements were contaminated with anabolic steroids that can lead to health complications affecting the kidney, the heart, and cause gynecomastia. Multiple bodybuilding products also contained antidepressants and antihistamines. Despite these findings, fewer than half of the adulterated supplements were recalled.

== Regulatory compliance ==
The European Commission has published harmonized rules on supplement products to assure consumers have minimal health risks from using dietary supplements and are not misled by advertising.

In the United States and Canada, dietary supplements are considered a subset of foods, and are regulated accordingly. The U.S. Food and Drug Administration (FDA) monitors supplement products for accuracy in advertising and labeling. Dietary supplements are regulated by the FDA as food products subject to compliance with current Good Manufacturing Practices (CGMP) and labeling with science-based ingredient descriptions and advertising. When finding CGMP or advertising violations, FDA warning letters are used to notify manufacturers of impending enforcement action, including search and seizure, injunction, and financial penalties. Examples between 2016 and 2018 of CGMP and advertising violations by dietary supplement manufacturers included several with illegal compositions or advertising of vitamins and minerals.

The U.S. Federal Trade Commission, which litigates against deceptive advertising in marketed products, established a consumer center to assist reports of false health claims in product advertising for dietary supplements. In 2017, the FTC successfully sued nine manufacturers for deceptive advertising of dietary supplements.

== Adverse effects ==
In the United States, manufacturers of dietary supplements are required to demonstrate safety of their products before approval is granted for commerce. Despite this caution, numerous adverse effects have been reported, including muscle cramps, hair loss, joint pain, liver disease, and allergic reactions, with 29% of the adverse effects resulting in hospitalization, and 20% in serious injuries or illnesses. The potential for adverse effects also occurs when individuals consume more than the necessary daily amount of vitamins or minerals that are needed to maintain normal body processes and functions. The incidence of adverse effects reported to the FDA were due to "combination products" that contain multiple ingredients, whereas dietary supplements containing a single vitamin, mineral, lipid product, and herbal product were less likely to cause adverse effects related to excess supplementation.

Among general reasons for the possible harmful effects of dietary supplements are: a) absorption in a short time, b) manufacturing quality and contamination, and c) enhancing both positive and negative effects at the same time. The incidence of liver injury from herbal and dietary supplements is about 16–20% of all supplement products causing injury, with the occurrence growing globally over the early 21st century. The most common liver injuries from weight loss and bodybuilding supplements involve hepatocellular damage with resulting jaundice, and the most common supplement ingredients attributed to these injuries are green tea catechins, anabolic steroids, and the herbal extract, aegeline. Weight loss supplements have also had adverse psychiatric effects. Some dietary supplements may also have adverse interactions with prescription medications that may enhance side effects or decrease therapeutic effects of medications.

== Society and culture ==
=== Public health ===
Work done by scientists in the early 20th century on identifying individual nutrients in food and developing ways to manufacture them raised hopes that optimal health could be achieved and diseases prevented by adding them to food and providing people with dietary supplements; while there were successes in preventing vitamin deficiencies, and preventing conditions like neural tube defects by supplementation and food fortification with folic acid, no targeted supplementation or fortification strategies to prevent major diseases like cancer or cardiovascular diseases have proved successful.

For example, while increased consumption of fruits and vegetables are related to decreases in mortality, cardiovascular diseases and cancers, supplementation with key factors found in fruits and vegetable, like antioxidants, vitamins, or minerals, do not help and some have been found to be harmful in some cases. In general, as of 2016, robust clinical data is lacking, that shows that any kind of dietary supplementation does more good than harm for people who are healthy and eating a reasonable diet but there is clear data showing that dietary pattern and lifestyle choices are associated with health outcomes.

As a result of the lack of good data for supplementation and the strong data for dietary pattern, public health recommendations for healthy eating urge people to eat a plant-based diet of whole foods, minimizing ultra-processed food, salt and sugar and to get exercise daily, and to abandon Western pattern diets and a sedentary lifestyle.

=== Legal regulation ===
==== United States ====
The regulation of food and dietary supplements by the U.S. Food and Drug Administration (FDA) is governed by various statutes enacted by the United States Congress. Pursuant to the Federal Food, Drug, and Cosmetic Act and accompanying legislation, the FDA has authority to oversee the quality of substances sold as food in the United States, and to monitor claims made in the labeling about both the composition and the health benefits of foods.

Substances which the FDA regulates as food are subdivided into various categories, including foods, food additives, added substances (man-made substances which are not intentionally introduced into food, but nevertheless end up in it), and dietary supplements. The specific standards which the FDA exercises differ from one category to the next. Furthermore, the FDA has been granted a variety of means by which it can address violations of the standards for a given category of substances.

Dietary supplement manufacture is required to comply with the good manufacturing practices established in 2007. The FDA can visit manufacturing facilities, send warning letters if not in compliance with GMPs, stop production, and if there is a health risk, require that the company conduct a recall. Only after a dietary supplement product is marketed, may the FDA's Center for Food Safety and Applied Nutrition (CFSAN) review the products for safety and effectiveness.

==== European Union ====
The European Union's (EU) Food Supplements Directive of 2002 requires that supplements be demonstrated to be safe, both in dosages and in purity. Only those supplements that have been proven to be safe may be sold in the EU without prescription. As a category of food, food supplements cannot be labeled with drug claims but can bear health claims and nutrition claims.

The dietary supplements industry in the United Kingdom (UK), one of the 28 countries in the bloc, strongly opposed the Directive. In addition, a large number of consumers throughout Europe, including over one million in the UK, and various doctors and scientists, had signed petitions by 2005 against what are viewed by the petitioners as unjustified restrictions of consumer choice. In 2004, along with two British trade associations, the Alliance for Natural Health (ANH) had a legal challenge to the Food Supplements Directive referred to the European Court of Justice by the High Court in London.

Although the European Court of Justice's Advocate General subsequently said that the bloc's plan to tighten rules on the sale of vitamins and food supplements should be scrapped, he was eventually overruled by the European Court, which decided that the measures in question were necessary and appropriate for the purpose of protecting public health. ANH, however, interpreted the ban as applying only to synthetically produced supplements, and not to vitamins and minerals normally found in or consumed as part of the diet. Nevertheless, the European judges acknowledged the Advocate General's concerns, stating that there must be clear procedures to allow substances to be added to the permitted list based on scientific evidence. They also said that any refusal to add the product to the list must be open to challenge in the courts.

=== Fraudulent products during the COVID-19 outbreak ===
During the COVID-19 pandemic in the United States, the FDA and Federal Trade Commission (FTC) warned consumers about marketing scams of fraudulent supplement products, including homeopathic remedies, cannabidiol products, teas, essential oils, tinctures and colloidal silver, among others. By August 2020, the FDA and FTC had issued warning letters to dozens of companies advertising scam products, which were purported "to be drugs, medical devices or vaccines. Products that claim to cure, mitigate, treat, diagnose or prevent disease, but are not proven safe and effective for those purposes, defraud consumers of money and can place consumers at risk for serious harm"

== Research ==
Examples of ongoing government research organizations to better understand the potential health properties and safety of dietary supplements are the European Food Safety Authority, the Office of Dietary Supplements of the United States National Institutes of Health, the Natural and Non-prescription Health Products Directorate of Canada, and the Therapeutic Goods Administration of Australia. Together with public and private research groups, these agencies construct databases on supplement properties, perform research on quality, safety, and population trends of supplement use, and evaluate the potential clinical efficacy of supplements for maintaining health or lowering disease risk.

=== Databases ===
As continual research on the properties of supplements accumulates, databases or fact sheets for various supplements are updated regularly, including the Dietary Supplement Label Database, Dietary Supplement Ingredient Database, and Dietary Supplement Facts Sheets of the United States. In Canada where a license is issued when a supplement product has been proven by the manufacturer and government to be safe, effective and of sufficient quality for its recommended use, an eight-digit Natural Product Number is assigned and recorded in a Licensed Natural Health Products Database. The European Food Safety Authority maintains a compendium of botanical ingredients used in manufacturing of dietary supplements.

In 2015, the Australian Government's Department of Health published the results of a review of herbal supplements to determine if any were suitable for coverage by health insurance. Establishing guidelines to assess safety and efficacy of botanical supplement products, the European Medicines Agency provided criteria for evaluating and grading the quality of clinical research in preparing monographs about herbal supplements. In the United States, the National Center for Complementary and Integrative Health of the National Institutes of Health provides fact sheets evaluating the safety, potential effectiveness and side effects of many botanical products.

=== Quality and safety ===
To assure supplements have sufficient quality, standardization, and safety for public consumption, research efforts have focused on development of reference materials for supplement manufacturing and monitoring. High-dose products have received research attention, especially for emergency situations such as vitamin A deficiency in malnutrition of children, and for women taking folate supplements to reduce the risk of breast cancer.

=== Population monitoring ===
In the United States, the National Health and Nutrition Examination Survey (NHANES) has investigated habits of using dietary supplements in context of total nutrient intakes from the diet in adults and children. Over the period of 1999 to 2012, use of multivitamins decreased, and there was wide variability in the use of individual supplements among subgroups by age, sex, race/ethnicity, and educational status. Particular attention has been given to use of folate supplements by young women to reduce the risk of fetal neural tube defects.

=== Clinical studies ===
Limited human research has been conducted on the potential for dietary supplementation to affect disease risk. Examples:

- vitamin D – acute respiratory tract infections
- iron – maternal iron deficiency anemia and adverse effects on the fetus
- multiple supplements – no evidence of benefit to lower risk of death, cardiovascular diseases or cancer
- magnesium supplementation – in reducing all-cause and cancer mortality, as well as improving glucose parameters in people with diabetes and insulin-sensitivity parameters in those at high risk of diabetes.
- folate alone or with B vitamins – stroke

A 2017 academic review indicated a rising incidence of liver injury from use of herbal and dietary supplements, particularly those with steroids, green tea extract, or multiple ingredients.

=== Absence of benefit ===
The potential benefit of using essential nutrient dietary supplements to lower the risk of diseases has been refuted by findings of no effect or weak evidence in numerous clinical reviews, such as for HIV, or tuberculosis.

=== Reporting bias ===
A review of clinical trials registered at clinicaltrials.gov, which would include both drugs and supplements, reported that nearly half of completed trials were sponsored wholly or partially by industry. This does not automatically imply bias, but there is evidence that because of selective non-reporting, results in support of a potential drug or supplement ingredient are more likely to be published than results that do not demonstrate a statistically significant benefit. One review reported that fewer than half of the registered clinical trials resulted in publication in peer-reviewed journals.

=== Future ===
Improving public information about use of dietary supplements involves investments in professional training programs, further studies of population and nutrient needs, expanding the database information, enhancing collaborations between governments and universities, and translating dietary supplement research into useful information for consumers, health professionals, scientists, and policymakers. Future demonstration of efficacy from use of dietary supplements requires high-quality clinical research using rigorously qualified products and compliance with established guidelines for reporting of clinical trial results (e.g., CONSORT guidelines).

== See also ==
- Bodybuilding supplement
- Nutrient
- Megavitamin therapy
- Nutraceutical
- Dietary Supplement Health and Education Act of 1994
- Multivitamin
- Alternative medicine
