= Testosterone–cortisol ratio =

In human biology, the testosterone–cortisol ratio describes the ratio between testosterone, the primary male sex hormone and an anabolic steroid, and cortisol, another steroid hormone, in the human body.

The ratio is often used as a biomarker of physiological stress in athletes during training, during athletic performance, and during recovery, and has been explored as a predictor of performance. At least among weight-lifters, the ratio tracks linearly with increases in training volume over the first year of training but the relationship breaks down after that. A lower ratio in weight-lifters just prior to performance appears to predict better performance.

The ratio has been studied as a possible biomarker for criminal aggression, but as of 2009 its usefulness was uncertain.
