= ZMA (supplement) =

Bodybuilding supplement

ZMA (zinc monomethionine aspartate, magnesium aspartate and vitamin B6) is a supplement marketed towards athletes, gymnasts, and bodybuilders. It was developed by Victor Conte (founder of BALCO Laboratories in Burlingame, California).

== Formula ==
The ZMA formula is composed of zinc monomethionine aspartate (30 mg), magnesium aspartate (450 mg), and vitamin B_{6} as pyridoxine hydrochloride (10.5 mg). The manufacturer recommends that ZMA be taken 30 – 60 minutes before bedtime with an empty stomach to help synchronize absorption with sleep. The product should not be taken with foods or supplements containing calcium because calcium blocks the absorption of zinc.

While ZMA is a registered trademark of SNAC Nutrition, a subsidiary of SNAC System Inc., ZMA is not a patented formula and other manufacturers can produce supplements using a similar formula. Variations on the formula include ZMA-5 (ZMA formula with 5-Hydroxytryptophan), marketed as a sleep enhancer, and ZMA Nightcap, marketed as anabolic mineral support. Like all 5-HTP-containing supplements, serotonin levels may be increased- affecting sleep, appetite and temperature.

== Scientific studies ==
A 1998 study was performed on NCAA football players during an 8-week spring training program. Those who took the ZMA capsules experienced greater increases in muscle strength. However, the study was funded by SNAC Systems Inc, which controls the trademark for ZMA. One of the study's authors, Victor Conte, has ownership equity in SNAC System Inc.

In 2004, supplement company Cytodyne funded a study on 42 resistance-trained males using a product called Z-Mass PM that contained ZMA and additional ingredients Mucuna pruriens and polypodium vulgare. The study found that Z-Mass PM supplementation had no significant effects on total and free testosterone, IGF-1, growth hormone, cortisol, the ratio of cortisol to testosterone, or muscle and liver enzymes in response to training. No significant effects were observed in changes in strength, upper or lower body muscle endurance, or anaerobic sprint capacity.

In another study done in 2006, a team of German scientists measured the effect of ZMA on testosterone levels. The study found that ZMA altered urine color due to increased secretion of zinc. It found no effect on testosterone levels.
