= Meal replacement =

Food substitute with controlled quantities of calories and nutrients

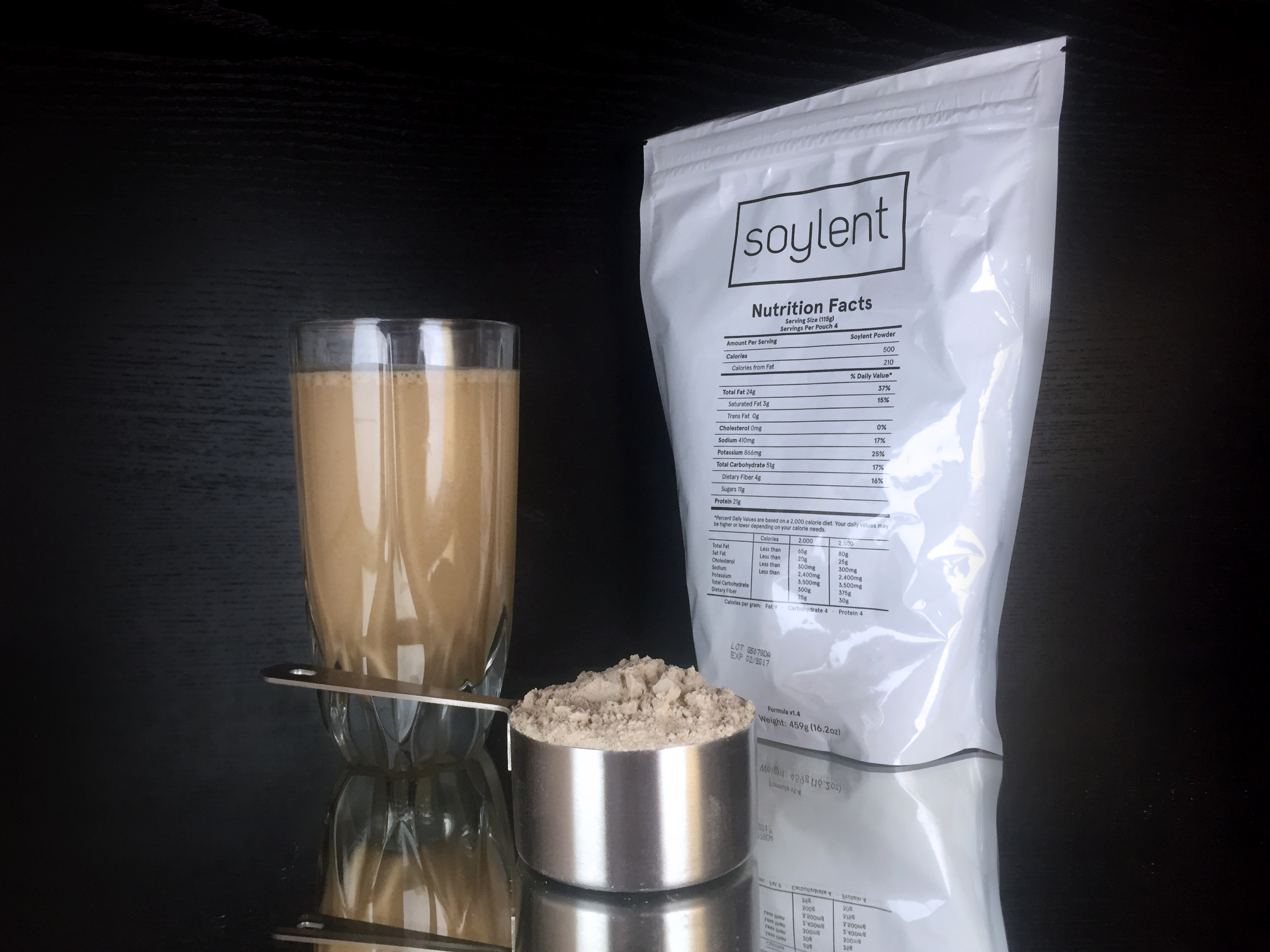
Meal replacements often come in liquid form, but there also are meals and powdered drinks such as Soylent.

A meal replacement is a drink, bar, soup, etc. intended as a substitute for a solid food, usually with controlled quantities of calories and nutrients. Some drinks come in powdered form or pre-mixed health shakes that can be cheaper than solid foods with identical health qualities. Medically prescribed meal replacement drinks include the body's necessary vitamins and minerals. Bodybuilders sometimes use meal replacements, not formulated for weight loss, to save food preparation time when eating 5-6 meals a day.

In Europe, weight-reduction meal replacements intended to either supplement ("Meal replacement for weight control") or totally replace ("Total diet replacement for weight control") normal meals are regulated as to their energy content, the nutrients they must provide, and information and advice on packaging by EU Directive 96/8/EC of 26 February 1996 on foods intended for use in energy-restricted diets for weight reduction. For example, a meal replacement must provide the minimum specified amounts of various vitamins and minerals and contain between 200 and 400 food calories of energy, of which no more than 30% can be from fat. Labeling information is prescribed, and packaging must provide a statement that the product should not be used for more than three weeks without medical advice in order to protect users from inadvertent malnutrition.

In the United States, the term "meal replacement" is not defined in federal Food and Drug Administration regulations but generally refers to a calorie-controlled, prepackaged product in the form of a bar or beverage (ready-to-drink or powder), that is meant to replace a higher calorie meal. Meal replacement products are usually fortified with more than 20 vitamins and minerals at "good" or "excellent" source levels. Meal replacement products can be regulated as conventional or functional foods. In Canada, meal replacements are regulated by the Canadian Food Inspection Agency and must meet minimum calorie, protein and vitamin requirements, causing some American products to be rejected.

== Regulations ==
=== EU ===
In the EU countries, meal replacements are divided into two categories: food supplements for weight control and preparations that completely replace conventional food for the same purpose. The nutrients that make up the mixtures are regulated by Directive 96/8/EC of February 26, 1996, "About food products intended for use in low-calorie diets to reduce weight".

=== United States ===
In the US, the concept of "meal replacement" is not defined by the rules of the Food and Drug Administration. As a rule, this concept refers to controlled-calorie foods marketed as bars, beverages or powders. Meal replacements usually contain from 200 to 250 calories per serving with the addition of 20 or more vitamins and minerals and low fat and sugar.

=== Canada ===
In Canada, food substitutes are governed by Canadian food inspection standards and must meet minimum calorie, protein, and vitamin requirements. Therefore, some American products are not allowed to be sold in Canada. The popular American meal replacement brand Soylent was blocked in Canada in 2017 after selling the product there for two years. In 2020, Soylent became available in Canada once more.

=== Asia ===
Meal replacements are not strictly regulated in Asia. However, some countries like Singapore, Hong Kong and Malaysia are stringent on claims meal replacement companies make, relating to health benefits and weight loss. Meal replacements have not gained as much popularity as in the USA or Europe, they are largely still only used for clinical cases. Despite this, there have been local start-ups focusing solely on meal replacements. Popular Asian brands include Base Foods (Japan) and Sustenance (Singapore).

== Effectiveness ==
There is some evidence that the meal replacement diet is effective for weight loss of obese individuals. Lean body mass is better preserved than with very-low-calorie diets, a related kind of diet but unregulated and potentially with unbalanced and insufficient nutrients formulations.

Meal replacements can be used to treat diabetes by maintaining weight loss. According to the American Diabetes Association (ADA), meal replacement products can be used once or twice a day, in lieu of regular meals, to maintain weight loss for individuals with diabetes. However, that weight loss can only be maintained as long as the individual keeps up with the meal replacement plan.

Meal replacements have been combined with GLP-1 receptor agonists to enhance adherence and efficacy.

The effects of meal replacements on weight loss for individuals with mental illness, such as schizophrenia, schizoaffective disorder, bipolar disorder, are inconclusive.

== In popular culture ==
Meal replacements have been a regular feature of science fiction and fantasy stories. Hugo Gernsback's 1911 novella Ralph 124C 41+ describes a system where food is liquefied and delivered to the diner through a flexible tube. L. Frank Baum's 1913 book The Patchwork Girl of Oz includes a Square Meal Tablet, "which was no bigger than your little finger-nail but contained, in condensed form, the equal of a bowl of soup, a portion of fried fish, a roast, a salad and a dessert". Food pills also appeared in the 1930 musical comedy film Just Imagine.

Meal replacements also appear in later space travel stories such as Santa Claus Conquers the Martians (1964) and the television series Lost in Space (1965).

== See also ==
- Elemental diet
- Energy bar
- Infant formula
- Liquid diet
- Therapeutic food
