= Protein supplement =

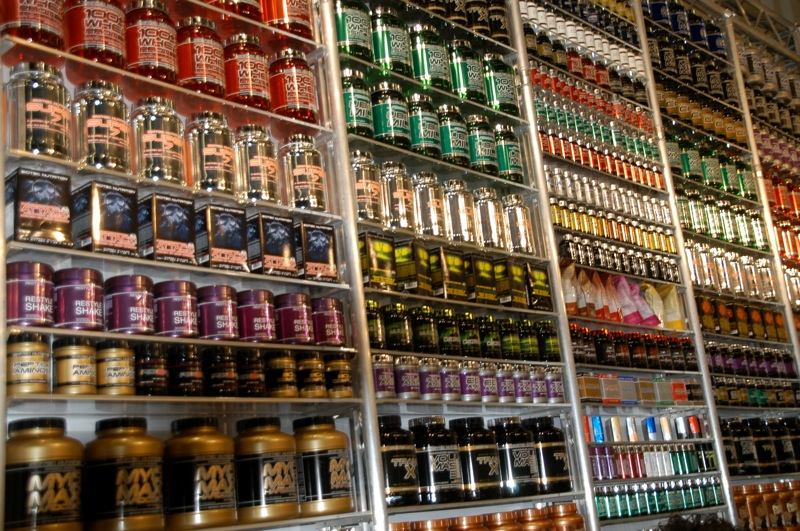
Various protein supplements

A protein supplement is a dietary supplement or a bodybuilding supplement, and usually comes in the form of a protein bar, protein powder, and even readily available as a protein shake. Protein supplements are usually made from whey, plant, and/or meat sources.

Protein supplements are extracts or concentrates of high protein foodstuffs, used in bodybuilding and as dietary supplements to fulfill protein intake in a lean and pure source of proteins and amino acids. They have three main variants: concentrate (food is taken and concentrated into a smaller volume with some fat and carb present), isolate (proteins and amino acids are completely isolated, mostly leaving proteins and amino acids), and hydrolyze (a protein supplement is exposed to enzymes and partially digested). Some protein supplements contain digestive enzymes as an additive for digestion and absorption. The range of grams of protein per scoop varies from brand to brand, some of the more high end protein powders reaching 30g of protein per scoop.

== Effects ==
=== Metabolism ===
A meta-study found that in the first few weeks of strength training with untrained individuals, changes in lean body mass and muscle strength during the initial weeks of strength training are not influenced by the protein supplementation, but after the first few weeks, protein supplementation "may promote muscle hypertrophy and enhance gains in muscle strength in both untrained and trained individuals" Also, whey-protein supplementation in overweight individuals may reduce the body weight, total fat mass and risk factors for cardiovascular diseases.

When combined with strength training, protein supplementation promotes greater gains in lean body mass and muscle strength as the intensity, frequency, and duration of strength training increases. It increases the muscles' strength and size, during prolonged strength training in healthy adults. A meta-study concluded that intake of protein supplements higher than around 1.6 g/kg/day do not further improve the gains in FFM (fat free mass) "at least for younger individuals", with a confidence interval from 1.03 to 2.20 so "it may be prudent to recommend ~2.2 g protein/kg/d for those seeking to maximize resistance training-induced gains in FFM".

=== Protein and aging ===
As people get older, aging reduces the effect of protein intake, and experts in the field of protein and aging recommend a protein intake between 1.2 and 2.0 g/kg/day or higher for elderly adults. Higher-than-ADA protein recommendations are especially important if they have acute or chronic diseases. Increased resistance training also helps balance aging's negative effect on muscle mass.

A study group concluded: "Older people with severe kidney disease (i.e., estimated GFR less than 30 mL/min/1.73m^{2}), but who are not on dialysis, are an exception to this rule; these individuals may need to limit protein intake."

=== Timing ===
Past studies propose that spreading protein intake through the day (with a maximum of 30g at a time) achieves maximal total stimulation of muscle protein synthesis. However, recent studies suggest that protein intake for muscle gain can be taken either throughout the day or at one time, if that is more convenient.

There is no evidence supporting specific pre/post-workout timing for protein-supplement intakes, despite the widely held belief that pre- or post-workout protein supplementation would be more effective.

=== Chronic kidney disease ===
Nutritional status can be altered in people living with chronic kidney disease (CKD). There is moderate-certainty evidence that regular consumption of oral protein-based nutritional supplements may increase serum albumin, a protein that can be lower in people with CKD, due to increased loss in urine and malnutrition. Improvements in albumin following protein supplementation may be greater in those who require hemodialysis or who are malnourished. Pre-albumin levels and mid-arm circumference measurements may also be increased following supplementation, though the certainty of evidence is low. Although these indicate possible improvements in nutritional status, it is unclear whether protein supplements affect quality of life, life expectancy, inflammation or body composition.

=== Heavy metals toxicity ===
Consumer Reports (CR) found that protein supplements regularly carry high levels of heavy metals, which are unsafe to consume. Two-thirds of tested products from CR had lead levels exceeding safe levels from a single serving, which was defined as 0.5 micrograms/day. CR found that plant-based products had much more lead than dairy/whey protein, but those still had elevated levels of lead. Some products tested by CR also had levels of cadmium and inorganic arsenic that concerned CR.

== See also ==
- Protein
- Protein synthesis
- Single-cell protein
