= Hull (surname) =

If the surname Hull is of topographical origin, it may derive from the Old English hyll, denoting a "dweller on or by a hill" (making it a Middle English West Country and West Midlands variant of Hill), or from a Welsh term for a rough, uneven place. It may also be of locational origin, e.g., Kingston upon Hull on the River Hull in Yorkshire, or derive from the personal name Hulle, a pet form of Hugh. The name spread from the British Isles throughout the Anglosphere.

The first notable bearer of the name in North America, a brother of the Rev. Joseph Hull, was George Hull (1590–1659) of Crewkerne, Somerset, who in 1630 sailed on the Mary and John from Plymouth, Devon, in cooperation with the Winthrop Fleet, and helped in the Puritan founding of Dorchester, which he represented at the General Court of the Massachusetts Bay Colony. Hull later surveyed lands for the new Colony of Connecticut, including Windsor and Wethersfield; helped found Fairfield; and served as a representative to the General Court and as assistant to his good friend Roger Ludlow, who appointed him associate magistrate for towns along the shoreline.

Notable people with the surname Hull include:

- Agrippa Hull (1759–1848), African-American colonial revolutionary
- Akasha Gloria Hull (born 1944), American poet, writer and critic
- Alan Hull (1945–1995), English singer-songwriter
- Albert W. Hull (1880–1966), American physicist and electrical engineer
- Allie Ray Hull (1915–2006), American politician
- Andrea Hull (born 1949), Australian academic
- Andrew Hull (1963–2010), Canadian-born filmmaker and director
- Andy Hull (born 1986), American singer, musician and songwriter
- Ann Hull (1925–2003), American politician
- Anne Hull (born 1961), American journalist
- Arthur Hull (disambiguation), several people
- Bart Hull (born 1969), Canadian-American football player
- Ben Hull (born 1972), English actor and presenter
- Blair Hull (born 1942), American businessman investor politician
- Bobby Hull (1939-2023), Canadian ice hockey player
- Brett Hull (born 1964), Canadian-American ice hockey player
- Bunny Hull (born 1951), American songwriter, musician and author
- Burling Hull (1889–1982), American magician
- Caesar Hull (1914–1940), South African flying ace
- Charles Hull (disambiguation), several people
- Charley Hull (born 1996), English golfer
- Chester Hull (1919–2012), Canadian military officer
- Chris Hull (born 1957), British theoretical physicist
- Christina M. Hull (born 1970), American mycologist
- Clark L. Hull (1884–1952), American psychologist
- Coral Hull (born 1965), Australian author, poet and artist
- Cordell Hull (1871–1955), American politician
- Cornelia Loomis Hull (1904–2001), American philanthropist
- Dakota Dave Hull (born 1950), American musician
- Daniel Campos-Hull (born 1989), Spanish racecar driver
- Daniel Ray Hull (1890–1964), American landscape architect
- David Hull (disambiguation), several people
- Dennis Hull (1944–2026), Canadian ice hockey player
- Derek Hull (born 1931), British material scientist
- Dianne Hull (born 1949), American actress
- E. M. Hull (1880–1947), British writer
- Edgar Hull (1904–1984), American physician
- Edmund Hull (born 1949), American diplomat
- Edna Mayne Hull (1905–1975), Canadian writer
- Edward Hull (disambiguation), several people
- Eleanor Hull (1860–1935), English writer and journalist
- Eleanor Hull, Lady Hull (c. 1394–1460), English translator
- Elizabeth Anne Hull (1937–2021), American science fiction expert
- Emmett J. Hull (1882–1957), American architect
- Eric Hull (born 1979), American baseball player
- Evan Hull (born 2000), American football player
- Ferenc Hüll (1800–1880), Slovene priest
- Florence Hull (born 1878), British suffragist
- Florence Hull Winterburn (born 1858), American author and editor
- Francis Hull (1816–1884), New Zealand politician
- Frank Hull (disambiguation), several people
- Fred Vant Hull (1920–1975), American football player
- Geoffrey Hull (born 1955), Australian linguist, ethnologist and historian
- George Hull (disambiguation), several people
- Gordon Ferrie Hull (1870–1956), Canadian-American mathematician and physicist
- Hannah Clothier Hull (1872–1958), American feminist and pacifist
- Harold Hull (1920–1988), American basketball player
- Harris Hull (1909–1993), American military officer
- Harry E. Hull (1864–1938), American businessman and politician
- Helen Huntington Hull (1893–1976), American socialite and arts patron
- Helen Rose Hull (1888–1971), American novelist and feminist
- Henry Hull (1890–1977), American character actor
- Henry Charles Hull (1860–1932), South African politician
- Herbert Hull (1886–1970), English cricketer
- Holly Hull (born 1994), British singer and actress
- Ian Hull (1916–1985), Australian rules footballer
- Isaac Hull (1773–1843), American military officer
- Isabel V. Hull (born 1949), American historian
- Jake Hull (born 2001), English footballer
- James Hull, British dentist
- James L. Hull (1873–1928), American soldier
- Jane Dee Hull (1935–2020), American politician and educator
- Jeff Hull (disambiguation), several people
- Jessica Hull (born 1996), Australian runner
- Jessie Hull Mayer (1910–2009), American painter and muralist
- Jimmy Hull (1917–1991), American basketball player
- Jody Hull (born 1969), Canadian ice hockey player
- John Hull (disambiguation), several people
- Joseph Hull (1596–1665), Colonial American minister
- Josephine Hull (1877–1957), American actress
- Josh Hull (American football) (born 1987), American football player
- Josh Hull (cricketer) (born 2004), English cricketer
- Katherine E. Hull (c. 1914 – disappeared 1936), American missing person
- Kay Hull (born 1954), Australian politician
- Kent Hull (1961–2011), American football player
- L.V. Hull (1942–2008), American artist
- Lacey Hull (born 1986), American politician
- Laurens Hull (1779–1865), American physician and politician
- Lee Hull (born 1965), American football player and coach
- Les Hull (born 1935), Canadian politician
- Lexie Hull (born 1999), American basketball player
- Liverus Hull (1822–1894), American businessman and politician
- Louis K. Hull (1861–1931), American football player
- Lynda Hull (1954–1994), American poet
- Marie Hull (1890–1980), American painter
- Mark Rowan-Hull (born 1968), British performance and visual artist
- McAllister Hull (1923–2011), American theoretical physicist
- Megan Hull (born 1996), New Zealand field hockey player
- Merlin Hull (1870–1953), American lawyer, newspaper publisher and politician
- Merry Hull (1908–1978), American designer and inventor
- Mike Hull (disambiguation), several people
- Morton D. Hull (1867–1937), American politician
- Moses Hull (1836–1907), American Seventh-day Adventist minister
- Noble A. Hull (1827–1907), American politician
- Patrick Hull (born 1966), American businessman
- Paul Hull (born 1968), English rugby union player
- Peggy Hull (1889–1967), American journalist
- Percy Hull (1878–1968), English organist and composer
- Peter Hull (born 1965), British swimmer
- Quentin Hull, Australian sports journalist
- R. F. C. Hull (1913–1974), British translator
- Rae Hull, Canadian media and television producer
- Ralph W. Hull (1883–1943), American magician
- Raymond Hull (writer) (1919–1985), Canadian playwright and screenwriter
- Raymond Hull (politician) (born 1963), American politician
- Richard Hull (disambiguation), several people
- Robert Hull (disambiguation), several people
- Robin Hull (1905–1960), English music critic
- Robin Hull (born 1974), Finnish snooker player
- Rod Hull (1935–1999), British comedian and television entertainer
- Roger Hull (insurance executive) (1907–1972), American businessman
- Roger Harold Hull (born 1942), American academic administrator
- Ron Hull (1940–2001), American football player and coach
- Ross A. Hull (c. 1902–1938), Australian-American radio engineer and experimenter
- Ross Hull (born 1975), Canadian actor and television personality
- Scott Hull (disambiguation), several people
- Shelley Hull (1884–1919), American actor
- Sierra Hull (born 1991), American singer-songwriter and musician
- Sippia Paul Hull (1852–1937), Chickasaw woman and early settler
- Sophia Hull (1786–1858), English writer
- Stephen A. Hull (1878–1973), American politician
- Steve Hull (born 1952), Canadian ice hockey player
- Steven Hull (born 1967), American artist
- T. Clark Hull (1921–1996), American politician and lawyer
- Thomas Hull (disambiguation), several people
- Toby Hull, British entertainer
- W.S. Hull (1848–1924), American architect
- Warren Hull (1903–1974), American actor, singer and television personality
- William Hull (disambiguation), several people
- Xiea Hull (born 1993), Antiguan model

== By title ==
- General Hull (disambiguation)
- Governor Hull (disambiguation)
- Judge Hull (disambiguation)
- Senator Hull (disambiguation)
