= Hull =

Hull may refer to:

== Structures ==
- The hull of an armored fighting vehicle, housing the chassis
- Fuselage, of an aircraft
- Hull (botany), the outer covering of seeds
- Hull (watercraft), the body or frame of a sea-going craft
- Submarine hull

== Mathematics ==
- Affine hull, in affine geometry
- Conical hull, in convex geometry
- Convex hull, in convex geometry
  - Carathéodory's theorem (convex hull)
- Holomorphically convex hull, in complex analysis
- Injective hull, of a module
- Linear hull, another name for the linear span
- Skolem hull, of mathematical logic

== Places ==
=== United Kingdom ===
==== England ====
- Kingston upon Hull, a city in the East Riding of Yorkshire commonly known as Hull
  - Hull City A.F.C., a football team
  - Hull FC, rugby league club formed in 1865, based in the west of the city
  - Hull Kingston Rovers (Hull KR), rugby league club formed in 1882, based in the east of the city
  - Port of Hull
  - University of Hull
- River Hull, river in the East Riding of Yorkshire and city of Kingston upon Hull.

=== Canada ===
- Hull, Quebec, a settlement opposite Ottawa, now part of the city of Gatineau
  - Hull (provincial electoral district)
  - Hull (federal electoral district), now named Hull—Aylmer

=== United States ===
- Hull, Florida
- Hull, Georgia
- Hull, Illinois
- Hull, Iowa
- Hull, Massachusetts
- Hull, North Dakota
- Hull, Texas
- Hull, West Virginia
- Hull, Marathon County, Wisconsin
- Hull, Portage County, Wisconsin

=== Other places ===
- Hull Island (disambiguation), several places

== Other uses ==
- Hull (surname)
- Hull classification symbol (hull code or hull number), a system to identify ships
- Hull House, a settlement house in Chicago, Illinois, United States
- USS Hull, any of four U.S. Navy ships
- Hull note, the final U.S. proposal delivered to the Empire of Japan before the attack on Pearl Harbor

== See also ==
- Hul (disambiguation)
- Hulk (ship type)
- Hull–White model of interest rates, in economics
