= William Hulle =

William Hulle may refer to:

- William Hulle (MP for Salisbury), in 1399, MP for Salisbury
- William Hulle (MP for New Shoreham), in 1397, MP for New Shoreham

== See also ==
- William de la Hulle (fl. 1302–1341), English politician, MP for Bridgnorth
- William Hull (disambiguation)
