= Arthur Hall =

Arthur Hall may refer to:

- Arthur Hall (English politician) (1539–1605), English Member of Parliament
- Arthur R. Hall (1869–1955), head football coach at the University of Illinois, 1907–1912
- Arthur Hall (New Zealand politician) (1880–1931), New Zealand politician
- Arthur Hall (stationer), 19th-century British publisher and writer
- Arthur Hall (soldier) (1896–1978), Australian recipient of the Victoria Cross
- Arthur Henderson Hall (1906–1983), English painter, illustrator and glass designer
- Arthur Hall (footballer) (1918–2002), Australian rules footballer
- Arthur David Hall III (1925–2006), American electrical engineer
- Arthur L. Hall (1934–2000), African American dancer, choreographer
- Arthur C. A. Hall (1847–1930), bishop of Vermont in the Episcopal Church

== See also ==
- Arthur Hull (disambiguation)
