= Hulle =

Hulle is a surname of Old English origin.

Notable people with the surname include:

- John Hulle (MP for Totnes) (fl. 1402), English member of parliament
- John Hulle (MP for Wilton) (fl. 1388, died after 1403), English member of parliament
- William Hulle (MP for New Shoreham) (fl. 1397), English member of parliament
- William Hulle (MP for Salisbury) (fl. 1399), English member of parliament

== See also ==
- Hull (surname)
- Van Hulle, a surname
- Hule (disambiguation)
