= Hule =

Hule may refer to:

- Hule Mill Farm, watermill in Lejre Municipality, Denmark
- Lake Hule, fresh water crater lake
- Petra Hule (born 1999), Australian tennis player
- Hule, Chinese town on the list of township-level divisions of Anhui

== See also ==
- Hul (disambiguation)
- Huel, British food company
- Hulle, a surname
