= Hul =

Hul or HUL may refer to:

== People ==
- Hul (biblical figure)
- Hul Kimhuy (born 2000), Cambodian footballer
- Hul Savorn (fl. 2000s), Cambodian politician
- Brian Van't Hul (fl. 1990s–2020s), visual effects artist.
- Jon Hul (born 1957), American pin-up artist

== Other uses ==
- Hul, Nové Zámky District, village in Slovakia
- Harvard University Library
- Hindustan Unilever, an Indian consumer goods manufacturer
- Houlton International Airport, in Maine, United States
- Hull Paragon Interchange, in Kingston upon Hull, England
- Keapara language, spoken in Papua New Guinea

== See also ==
- Hull (disambiguation)
- Hule (disambiguation)
- Hulle, a surname
- Huel, British food seller
