= John Hulle =

John Hulle may refer to:

- John Hulle (MP for Wilton) (fl. 1388)
- John Hulle (MP for Totnes) (fl.1402)

== See also ==
- John Hull (disambiguation)
