= Van Hulle =

Van Hulle is a Dutch surname. People with the surname include:

- Anselm van Hulle (c. 1601–1674/1694), Flemish portrait painter
- Marc Van Hulle (fl. 2010s–2020s), Belgian electrical engineer
- Rene Van Hulle (1953–2007), American LGBT activist and writer

== See also ==
- Hulle, a surname
