= Hüls =

Hüls is a placename and surname in the German language, and may also be represented as Huls or Huels in other languages without diacritical marks

Hüls, Huls and Huels may refer to:

== Places ==
- Hüls, a community of Aachen, Germany
- Hüls (Krefeld), a district of Krefeld, Germany
- Hüls, a village of Marl, North Rhine-Westphalia, Germany
- Huls, Netherlands, a hamlet in the southeast Netherlands

== Companies and Organizations ==
- Chemische Werke Hüls, the former name of today's Marl Chemical Park, Marl, Germany
- Hüls AG and Degussa-Hüls, the predecessor companies of Evonik Industries
- hülsta or Hülsta-Werke Hüls Gmbh, a German furniture company
- TSV Marl-Hüls, a football club in Marl, Germany
- VfB Hüls, a football club from Marl, Germany

== See also ==
- Hull (disambiguation), including Hulls
