= Marbhung-1, Simaltari, Gulmi =

Place in Nepal

Simaltari (Nepali: सिमलटारी) is a place in Malika Rural Municipality ward number 8 of Gulmi District, in the hills of Lumbini Province, Nepal, bordered by Dhurkot, Madane and Arjai rural municipalities.

It is located on a river valley, bordered by the Chhaldi and Hul streams, placing it within their confluence. A 29-kilometer asphalt road connects it to the district headquarters of Tamghas. It contains a secondary school, Shree Malika Higher Secondary School and a lower secondary school, Civil English Boarding School.

As of the 2011 census, Simaltari contains 883 households with a population of 3,821, according to the National Population and Housing Census, CBS 2011.

The main occupation of the area is agriculture along with small scale businesses. It is well connected to the electricity and cellular networks. It is located on the Madan Bhandari Highway and has a public transport system. Direct buses to Tamghas, Butwal and Kathmandu including other nearby districts operate throughout the year.

== Location and climate ==
Simaltari is located at an elevation of about 1,050 m with a sub-tropical climate. It is located at approximately 28°10'29.05" N and 83°07'43.72" E.
