= Michael Dare =

- Born: August 1, 1917; Montreal, Quebec
- Died: May 22, 1996 (aged 78) Victoria, British Columbia
- Allegiance: Canada
- Branch: Canadian Army / Canadian Forces
- Rank: Lieutenant-general
- Conflicts: World War II
- Awards: Distinguished Service Order; Officer of the Order of Military Merit; Canadian Forces' Decoration

Lieutenant-General Michael Reginald Dare DSO, OMM, CD (August 1, 1917 – May 22, 1996) was a Canadian Forces officer who became Vice Chief of the Defence Staff in Canada.

== Career ==
Dare joined the Canadian Army as second lieutenant in the Dufferin and Haldimand Rifles in the 1930s. He served in World War II as an infantry officer in The Royal Canadian Regiment, then as a staff officer at Headquarters, 4th Canadian (Armoured) Division in Normandy and then, from September 1944, as brigade major, 4th Canadian (Armoured) Division, before being appointed, in March 1945, assistant adjutant and quartermaster-general at Headquarters, 4th Canadian (Armoured) Division. He went on to be Vice Chief of the Defence Staff in Canada in September 1969 before retiring in 1972.

After retiring from the army, Dare succeeded John Starnes as head of the RCMP Security Service in 1973.

He died in 1996 in Victoria, British Columbia.

Military offices
Preceded by Frederick Sharp	Vice Chief of the Defence Staff; 1969-1972	Succeeded by Chester Hull
