= Edward Hull =

Edward Hull may refer to:

- Edward Hull (cricketer) (1879–1947), Jamaican cricketer
- Edward Hull (geologist) (1829–1917), Irish geologist and stratigrapher
- Edward Hull (knight) (c. 1410–1453), English knight
- Edward Hull (watercolourist) (1823–1906), British illustrator and watercolourist
