= John Hull =

John Hull may refer to:

== Politicians ==
- John Hull (MP for Hythe) (died 1540 or after), MP for Hythe
- John Hull (MP for Exeter) (died 1549), English MP for Exeter
- John A. T. Hull (1841–1928), American politician
- John C. Hull (politician) (1870–1947), Speaker of the Massachusetts House of Representatives

== Theologians and educators ==
- John C. Hull (economist) (born 1946), professor of derivatives and risk management at the University of Toronto
- John M. Hull (1935–2015), professor of religious education at the University of Birmingham
- John H. E. Hull (1923–1977), theologian, Mansfield College, Oxford

== Others ==
- John Hull (merchant) (1624–1683), American colonial merchant and politician
- John A. Hull (1874–1944), Judge Advocate General and Associate Justice of the Supreme Court of the Philippines
- John E. Hull (1895–1975), United States Army general
- John Hull (physician) (1761–1843), physician and obstetrician

== See also ==
- John Hulle (disambiguation)
