= Titchwell =

Village in Norfolk, England

Coordinates: 52.96178°N 0.61896°E

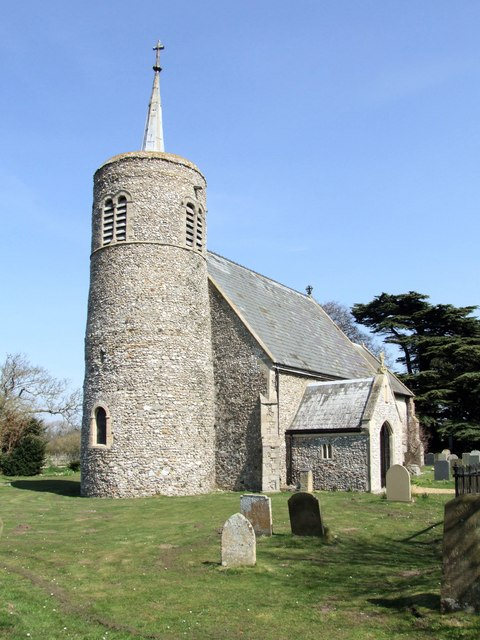
- St Mary's Church, Titchwell

- Location within Norfolk
- Area: 6.46 km^{2} (2.49 sq mi)
- OS grid reference: TF 760 437
- Civil parish: Titchwell
- District: King's Lynn and West Norfolk
- Shire county: Norfolk
- Region: East
- Country: England
- Sovereign state: United Kingdom
- Post town: KING'S LYNN
- Postcode district: PE31
- Police: Norfolk
- Fire: Norfolk
- Ambulance: East of England

Titchwell is a village and civil parish in Norfolk, England. It is situated on the north Norfolk coast some 1.2 mi (2 km) west of the village of Brancaster, 5.6 mi (9 km) north-east of the seaside resort of Hunstanton, 19 mi (30 km) north of the town of King's Lynn and 43 mi (70 km) north-west of the city of Norwich.

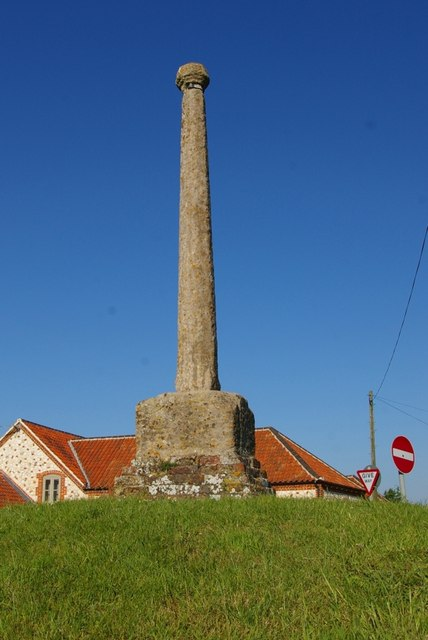
The village cross

The villages name means 'Young goat spring/stream'.

The civil parish has an area of 2.49 sq mi (6.46 km^{2}) and in the 2001 census had a population of 91 in 47 households. At the 2011 Census the population remained less than 100 and is included in the civil parish of Thornham. For the purposes of local government, the parish falls within the district of King's Lynn and West Norfolk.

The village is noted for its RSPB reserve at Titchwell Marsh, an area of salt and freshwater marsh that extends along the coast towards Brancaster. It also has an Anglo Saxon church with an unusual spirelet.

There is a small nature reserve on the site of a former chalk pit, which is believed to have first been used in Roman times. In 1786, under the Inclosure Act 1773, the land came into ownership of Titchwell Parish. After all the chalk had been removed, the land became a rubbish dump, which was soon closed following public outcry. Local farmers and Norfolk County Council then tidied the pit and planted trees and shrubs, creating a mini-reserve.

Titchwell used to have two pubs, but one of them, "The Three Horseshoes" has now been converted into apartments for the use of holidaymakers and investors. The village also has a 15th-century village cross at its centre, which would have been a marker point and meeting place for travellers and pilgrims.

The Church of England parish church, dedicated to St Mary, is a Grade I listed building. It is one of the 124 round-tower churches in Norfolk.

It also has two hotels, Briarfields and Titchwell Manor.

== See also ==
- Titchwell dispute
- Paget Wilkes (1871 – 1934)
