= Governor Hull (disambiguation) =

Governor Hull may also refer to:

- Jane Dee Hull (1935–2020), Governor of Arizona
- William Hull (1753–1825), Territorial Governor of Michigan

== See also ==
- Governor Hall (disambiguation)
