= General Hull =

General Hull may refer to:

- Charles Hull (British Army officer) (1865–1920), British Army major general
- Chester Hull (1919–2012), Canadian Forces lieutenant general
- Harris Hull (1909–1993), U.S. Air Force brigadier general
- John A. Hull (1874–1944), U.S. Army major general
- John E. Hull (1895–1975), U.S. Army general
- Richard Hull (1907–1989), British Army general
- William Hull (1753–1825), U.S. Army brigadier general
