= Eleanor Hull, Lady Hull =

15th-century English translator

Eleanor Hull, Lady Hull (c.1394–1460) was a 15th-century English translator, the first woman known to have made translations from French into English.

Hull was the only child of Sir Johhn Malet and Joan Hylle. She married Sir John Hull (died c.1420), a retainer of John of Gaunt and ambassador to Castile, and had one son. After her husband's death, she lived at Sopwell Priory. She later retired to the Benedictine priority at Cannington, Somerset.

Hull translated an Old French commentary on the Penitential Psalms, as well as some other prayers and meditations.
