= Judge Hull =

Judge Hull may refer to:

- Frank M. Hull (born 1948), judge of the United States Court of Appeals for the Eleventh Circuit
- Thomas Gray Hull (1926–2008), judge of the United States District Court for the Eastern District of Tennessee
