= Hull Island =

Hull Island may refer to:

- Orona in the Phoenix Islands, in the Republic of Kiribati, and once known as Hull Island
- Îles Maria, a coral atoll in the Pacific Ocean, within the Austral Islands, and also formerly known as Hull Island
- Hull Island, in the Beverley Group of the Northumberland Islands off the coast of Queensland, Australia

== Canada ==
- Île Hull, name of the island that Downtown Hull, Quebec is on
- Hull Island (British Columbia), in the Central Coast/Johstone Strait region of British Columbia
