= Richard Hull (disambiguation) =

Richard Hull (1907–1989) was a senior British Army officer.

Richard Hull may also refer to:

- Richard Ferguson-Hull, American animation director
- R. F. C. Hull (1913–1974), British translator
- Richard Hull (1641–1693), Anglo-Irish politician
- Richard Hull (died 1759), Anglo-Irish politician
- Richard Hull (executive), American media and entertainment executive
- Richard Hull (writer) (1896–1973), British crime novelist
