= Frank Hull =

Frank Hull may refer to:

- Frank E. Hull (1882–1968), American film editor
- Frank M. Hull (born 1948), American judge
- Frank Montgomery Hull (1901–1982), American naturalist

== See also ==
- Francis Hull (1816–1884), New Zealand politician
