= Stephen A. Hull =

American politician

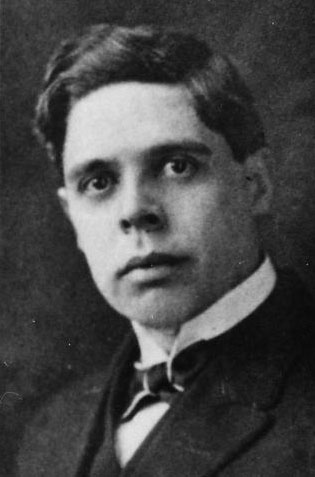
- Hull in 1917

Member of the Washington House of Representatives for the 46th district
- In office 1915–1921

Personal details
- Born: June 16, 1878 St. Louis, Missouri, United States
- Died: October 19, 1973 (aged 95) Seattle, Washington, United States
- Party: Republican

Stephen Allen Hull (June 16, 1878 – October 19, 1973) was an American politician in the state of Washington. He served in the Washington House of Representatives.
