= Florence Hull =

British suffragette

Florence Jessie Hull (1878 – ) was a British suffragette who wrote about her experience of being imprisoned for the cause. She was a member of the Women's Social and Political Union (WSPU) and secretary of its Letchworth branch. She was an active campaigner for women's suffrage and served time in prison for her role in a suffragette protest. Her arrest took place in the context of a window smashing campaign by the WSPU. Hull is noted on the Roll of Honour of Suffragette Prisoners 1905-1914.

== Early life ==
Hull was born in 1878 in the parish of St Ackmunds, in Derby to Thomas William Hull, a soap manufacturer, and Elizabeth Sherwood Parlett Hull. She was the younger sister of Thomas and Daisy. Her family subsequently moved to Letchworth in Hertfordshire, where they resided at 312 Norton Way.

== Campaign for women's suffrage ==
Hull served as honorary secretary of the Letchworth branch of the WSPU and hosted meetings of the branch at her family home.

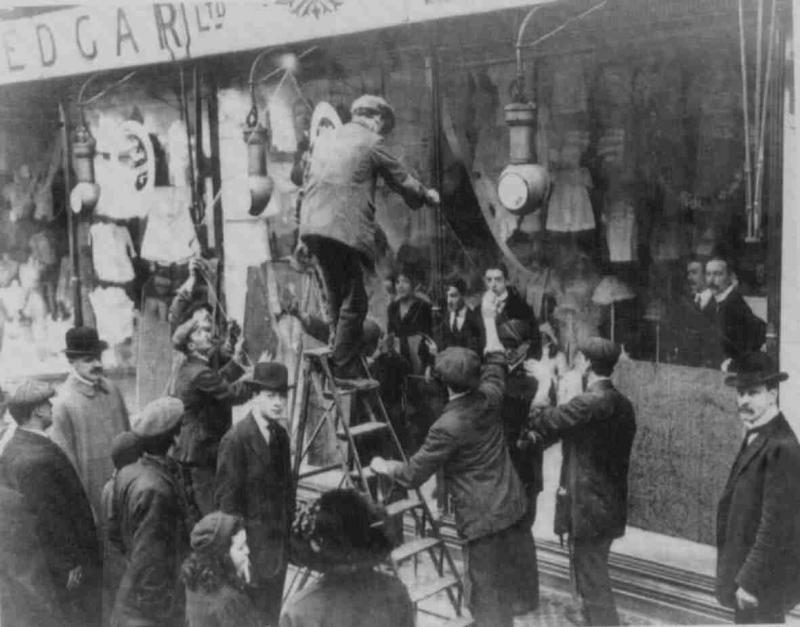
suffragette window smashing campaign

She was arrested for her part in a suffragette demonstration in London on 29 January 1913. She was charged with smashing windows at the Colonial Office and sentenced at Bow Street Police Court to 14 days in prison, in default of a 20s fine and £2 damages. Her response to the charge was "I mean to stop here, so don't want bail" and in reply to the magistrate, she said "I did it as a protest against the Liberal Government, and the sooner they give us the franchise the better it will be for them."

She subsequently wrote about her experience of prison in The Suffragette, the WSPU newspaper:

"All through the night, at intervals of less than an hour, a warder would open the wooden windows and ask, 'Are you all right?'. If a wardress was in charge too, she was not in evidence. There is a plank fitted up in the cell; half is used for a bed, the other half for a lavatory, the plug being pulled by a warder outside when he deems fit."

Hull's protest was part of a WSPU campaign to "make London absolutely unbearable to the average citizen". WSPU founder Emmeline Pankhurst said that, with the sole exception of regard for human life, suffragettes should adopt any methods they liked, while Deputy Annie Kenney urged women "never to leave home without a hammer" to smash windows or attack letter boxes.

It was common for suffragettes at the time to use an alias, "either to protect their family from obloquy by association or, more commonly, in their attempts to evade the police". Hull went by Mary Gray and it is likely that she is noted twice on the Roll of Honour of Suffragette Prisoners.

== See also ==
- List of suffragists and suffragettes
- Timeline of women's suffrage
