= Thomas Hull =

Thomas Hull may refer to:

- Thomas Hull (actor) (1728–1808), English actor and dramatist
- Thomas Hull (MP) (1528–1575/1576), English politician
- Thomas E. Hull (1893–1964), American hotelier
- Thomas Gray Hull (1926–2008), American judge
- Tom Hull (American football) (born 1952), American football linebacker
- Tom Hull (critic) (born 1950), American music critic and software designer
- Tom Hull (mathematician), American mathematician who studies paper folding
- Kid Harpoon, stage name of Tom Hull (born 1982), English singer-songwriter
