= Huel =

British powdered food product

Huel Inc.
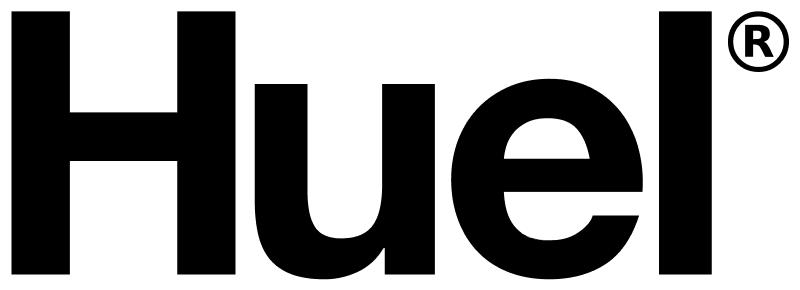
- Type: Privately held company
- Industry: Meal replacement; Functional food; Nutritional supplement
- Founded: 2014; 12 years ago
- Founders: Julian Hearn; James Collier
- Headquarters: Unit 6, Icknield Way Industrial Estate, Icknield Way, Tring, Hertfordshire, England
- Products: Huel
- Website: huel.com

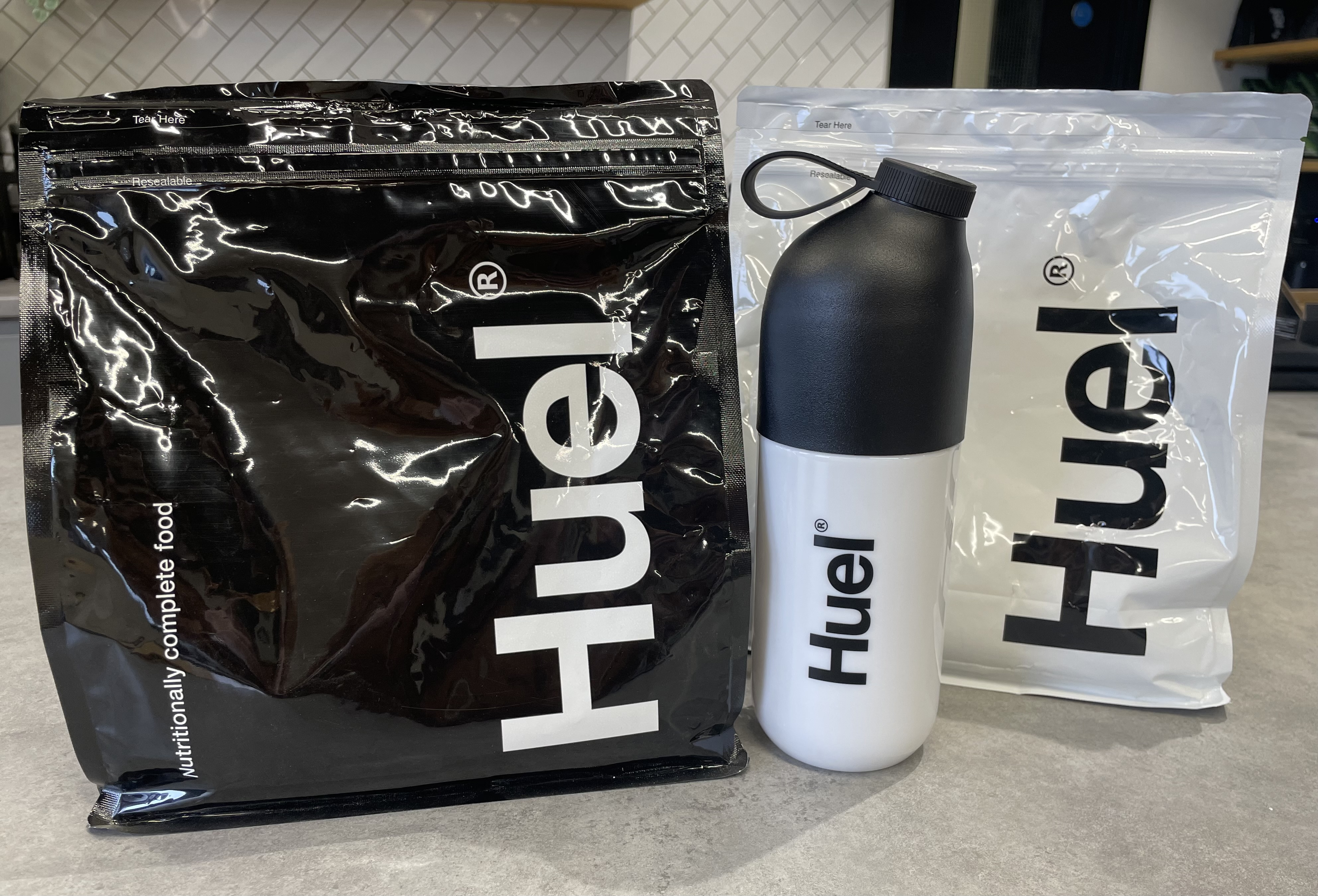
A pouch of Huel powder, Black Edition, and a Huel shaker

Huel Ltd. is a British company that makes meal replacement powdered foods. The company's head office is in Tring, Hertfordshire.

Huel's products are made from oats, rice protein, pea protein, sunflower, flaxseed, coconut oil MCTs, and several dietary supplements, such as vitamins and minerals. Most of its products are sweetened with sucralose or stevia. The brand's name is a portmanteau of "human fuel".

== History ==
In 2014, Huel was founded by Julian Hearn in Aylesbury, England. The original recipe was formulated by the registered nutritionist James Collier, founder and former owner of MuscleTalk, a bodybuilding website, with the intention of providing the recommended daily amounts of nutrients as stipulated by the European Food Safety Authority.

Huel powder, the company's first product, was released in 2015. Its ingredients contain oats, rice protein, pea protein, and micronutrients. The Black Edition came out in 2019; it contains 50% fewer carbohydrates and 33% more protein than the original Huel powder, and it is sweetened with stevia and organic coconut sugar, instead of artificial sweetener. In 2023, Huel added Daily Greens, a powder supplement containing antioxidants, phytonutrients, adaptogens, and plant-based proteins, as well as 91 vitamins and minerals.

In 2016, Huel began shipping to the rest of Europe, and by June 2017, it became available in the United States. In November 2017, the former Life Health Foods UK chief executive James McMaster was appointed as the company's CEO, overseeing its international expansion.

In 2023, Huel reported a 28% increase in revenue year-on-year, reaching £184.5 million for the 12 months to 31 July 2023. In 2024, the company surpassed £200 million in revenue for the financial year ending 31 July 2024, tripling its profit compared to the previous year. In 2025, a study by Consumer Reports found elevated levels of lead and cadmium in Huel products.

In March 2026, it was reported that Huel would be acquired by Danone, in a deal valuing the company at €1 billion. In August, the deal was cleared by the Competition and Markets Authority.

== Banning of advertisements ==
In February 2023, the British Advertising Standards Authority (ASA) banned two Huel advertisements after ruling that claims that the product could help people save money were misleading and that one of the advertisements violated the rules on making health claims about products.

In August 2024, the ASA banned another Huel advertisement by Steven Bartlett due to undisclosed company affiliations.

In September 2026, a further advertisement was banned "for encouraging or condoning 'irresponsible' dietary practices"—implying that Huel could replace all conventional food.

== See also ==
- Soylent (meal replacement)
