= Hull, North Dakota =

Unincorporated community in North Dakota, US

Coordinates: 46°01′43″N 100°07′29″W

Hull is an unincorporated community in Emmons County, in the U.S. state of North Dakota.

== History ==
A post office called Hull was established in 1888, and remained in operation until 1954. The community took its name from Hull, Iowa, and it is a Dutch community.
