= William de la Hulle =

English politician

William de la Hulle (fl. 1302–1341) was an English politician. He sat as MP for Bridgnorth in 1327, Shropshire in 1327–8, 1340 and Bridgnorth again in 1341.
