= Jeff Hull =

Jeff Hull may refer to:

- Jeff Hull (artist) (born 1969), American artist and producer
- Jeff Hull (footballer) (born 1960), English footballer
