= Hull, West Virginia =

Hull
- Unincorporated community
- Location within the state of West Virginia Hull (the United States)
- Coordinates: 37°29′12″N 81°50′37″W
- Country: United States
- State: West Virginia
- County: McDowell
- Time zone: UTC-5 (Eastern (EST))
  - Summer (DST): UTC-4 (EDT)
- GNIS feature ID: 1689147

Hull is an unincorporated community in McDowell County, West Virginia, United States.
