= Charles Hull =

Charles or Chuck Hull may refer to:

- Charles Hull (British Army officer) (1865–1920), British military officer
- Charles Hull (VC) (1890–1953), English soldier, Victoria Cross recipient
- Charles Henry Hull (1864–1936), American economist and historian
- Chuck Hull (born 1939), American businessman
- Chuck Hull (ring announcer) (1924–2000), American ring announcer and sportscaster

== See also ==
- Charley Hull (born 1996), English golfer
