= Arthur L. Hall =

American choreographer

Arthur L. Hall (April 18, 1934 – July 6, 2000) was an African American dancer, choreographer, and teacher.

== Life and career ==
Arthur Lee Hall was born on April 18, 1934 in Memphis, Tennessee. Son of Joshua Milton and Sally Yancey, Hall was raised by his maternal grandmother until age 9. He then moved to Washington, D.C. and was reunited with his mother; who remarried to Patrick Hall. Hall first performed on stage at age 16 in Robert Nathaniel Dett's production The Ordering of Moses at Griffith Stadium on July 28, 1950.

In 1951, Hall moved to Philadelphia where he studied dance; and in 1954 he became a principal dancer with the West African Cultural Society founded by Saka Acquaye. In an interview with the Philadelphia Inquirer Magazine in 1968, Hall recalls: "I had danced a little in school, even won some contests, but I didn't know any technique. I joined the school and later went on to the Katherine Dunham School in New York. At that time I wanted to do Indian dancing, but I realize now that I was searching for something I could dedicate myself to." Hall joined the US Army Special Services in 1956. During his station in Germany, he worked with Argentinian filmmaker Jorge Preloran on the dance film about racism entitled, The Invictorious One.

In 1958, Hall founded the Arthur Hall Afro-American Dance Ensemble, a group based in Philadelphia and remained its Artistic Director for nearly 30 years. He taught dance at Dartmouth College among other schools. Hall served as cultural arts director of the Model Cities Program in Philadelphia, a movement specialist for the National Endowment for the Arts, instructor of dance at Dartmouth College, and was a member of the American Dance Festival and the Sacred Dance Guild. In 1968, he founded the Ife Ile Black Humanitarian Center on Germantown Avenue, Philadelphia (now the Village of the Arts). Hall received the Pennsylvania Governor's Hazlett Award in 1980.

Hall moved to Camden, Maine in later life. As boy in Tennessee, he would dream of living in Maine: "... as far away from Memphis as I could imagine." Hall once said, "I would walk down Beale Street to the Mississippi River and study a map of the United States. I thought Maine looked like the head of a cow wearing a bonnet." Hall first visited Maine in 1977 as an invited artist-in-residence in the Gorham and Winthrop schools. The residency inspired the award-winning film, Snake Dance Teacher Dance. In 1980, Hall founded the People to People Dance Company for which he also served as Artistic Director. Hall said, "I've done the all-black dance company. Now I want to build an international company from the base here in Maine."

Arthur Hall died on July 6, 2000. A Celebration of Life took place at the Camden Opera House in Camden, Maine on September 17, 2000.

On June 10, 2011, the Pennsylvania Historical and Museum Commission and Mayor of Philadelphia Michael Nutter unveiled an historic marker honoring Hall's former Ife Ile Black Humanitarian Center which served as his dance studio and home; and proclaimed the day Arthur Lee Hall Appreciation Day.

== Sources ==
- Francis Kobina Saighoe. "Traditional African American Music in Black American Socio-Cultural Interaction" African Music Editor. No 8. Dec 1996. p 28
- Dance Touring Program: Directory of dance companies. 1977. National Endowment for the Arts. Pg 122. The University of Michigan.
- The American Dance Festival. Jack Anderson. 1987. ISBN 978-0-8223-0683-2. Pg 277 Duke University Press.
- Dancing in Blackness. Halifu Osumare. February 8, 2019. ISBN 978-0-8130-6507-6. University Press of Florida.
- Experiencing Dance - From Student to Dance Artist. Helene Scheff, Marty Sprague, Susan McGreevy-Nichols. April 8, 2014. ISBN 978-1-4925-8438-4
