= Mike Hull =

Mike Hull may refer to:

- Mike Hull (fullback) (born 1945), American football fullback
- Mike Hull (linebacker) (born 1991), American football linebacker from Penn State who played for the Miami Dolphins
