= Marc Van Hulle =

Belgian scientist

Marc Van Hulle from the KU Leuven, Belgium was named Fellow of the Institute of Electrical and Electronics Engineers (IEEE) in 2014 "for contributions to biomedical signal processing and biological modeling".

== Selected publications ==
- Gautama, T., Mandic, D. P., & Van Hulle, M. M. (2003): Indications of nonlinear structures in brain electrical activity. Physical Review E, 67(4), 046204.
- Mora-Cortes, A., Manyakov, N. V., Chumerin, N., & Van Hulle, M. M. (2014): Language model applications to spelling with brain-computer interfaces. Sensors, 14(4), 5967-5993.
- Khachatryan, E., Vanhoof, G., Beyens, H., Goeleven, A., Thijs, V., & Van Hulle, M. M. (2016): Language processing in bilingual aphasia: a new insight into the problem. Wiley Interdisciplinary Reviews: Cognitive Science, 7(3), 180-196.
- Wittevrongel, B., Van Wolputte, E., & Van Hulle, M. M. (2017): Code-modulated visual evoked potentials using fast stimulus presentation and spatiotemporal beamformer decoding. Scientific reports, 7(1), 15037.
- Hnazaee, M. F., Wittevrongel, B., Khachatryan, E., Libert, A., Carrette, E., Dauwe, I., ... & Van Hulle, M. M. (2020): Localization of deep brain activity with scalp and subdural EEG. NeuroImage, 223, 117344.
- Mlinarič, T., Khachatryan, E., Wittevrongel, B. et al. [Marc M. Van Hulle]: Visual gamma stimulation induces 40 Hz neural oscillations in the human hippocampus and alters phase synchrony and lag. Commun Biol 8, 1301 (2025). https://doi.org/10.1038/s42003-025-08766-6.
