= Arthur David Hall III =

American electrical engineer

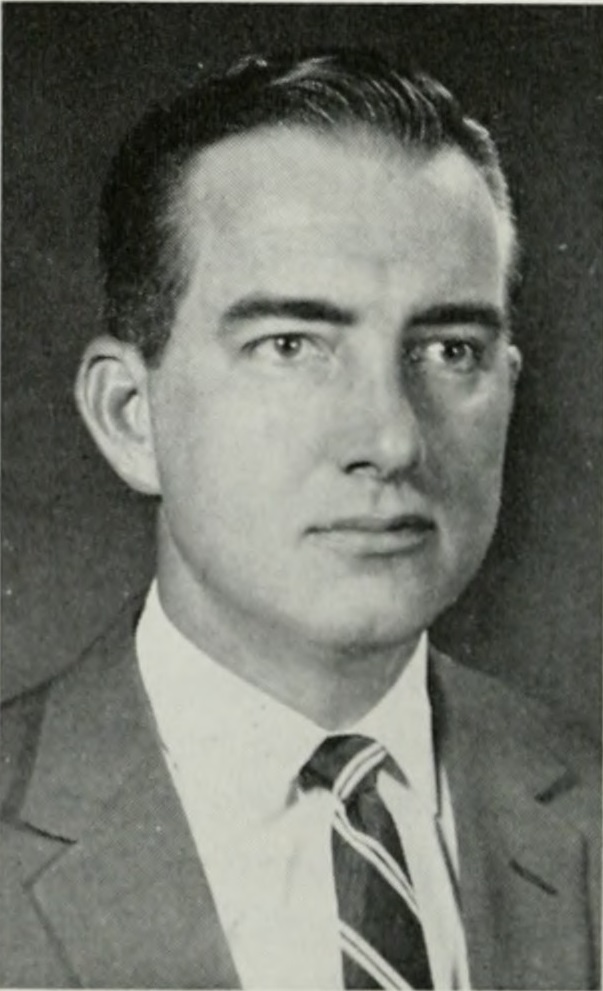
- Hall in 1964
- Born: April 13, 1924; Lynchburg, Virginia, U.S.A.
- Died: March 31, 2006 (aged 81); Fredericksburg, Virginia, U.S.A.
- Education: Princeton University

Arthur David Hall III (April 13, 1924 – March 31, 2006) was an American electrical engineer and a pioneer in the field of systems engineering. He was the author of a widely used engineering textbook A Methodology for Systems Engineering from 1962.

== Early life ==
Hall was born on April 13, 1924, in Lynchburg, Virginia. He attended Brookville High School. He served in the U.S. Army during World War II. After the war he studied electrical engineering at Princeton University, graduating in 1949.

== Career ==
He started his career as electrical engineer for Bell Labs, where he worked for many years. In the 1950s he started his own consulting business, and in the 1960s, Hall was faculty member at the Moore School of Electrical Engineering at the University of Pennsylvania. He is known as the author of a widely used engineering textbook A Methodology for Systems Engineering from 1962.

Hall was a founding member of the Institute of Electrical and Electronics Engineers. In 1965, Hall was the first editor of the IEEE Transactions on Systems Science and Cybernetics. Hall later became a senior IEEE fellow for contributions to systems engineering methodology, and applications to telecommunications policy and practice in the year 2000. He made contributions to systems engineering methodology, and applications to telecommunications policy and practice. Hall is listed in Who's Who Men of Science as the father of the "picture telephone", and creator of the patented "Auto Farm System", which provides global positioning equipment for precision farming. His further hobbies included flying, yachting, photography, and gardening.

== Later life ==
He died on March 31, 2006, in Fredericksburg, Virginia.

== Publications ==
Hall wrote several textbooks and articles on systems and systems engineering. Books:

- 1962, A Methodology for Systems Engineering.
- 1989, Metasystems Methodology, Oxford, England: Pergamon Press.

Articles, a selection:

- 1956, "Definition of System", with Robert E. Fagen, in: General Systems, 1 (1956), p. 18.
- 1965, "Systems Engineering from an Engineering Viewpoint" in: IEEE Transactions on Systems Science and Cybernetics, Nov. 1965, Volume: 1, Issue: 1. On page(s): 4-8
- 1969, "Three-Dimensional Morphology of Systems Engineering", in: IEEE Transactions on Systems Science and Cybernetics. 5(2) pp. 156–160.
- 1975, "Who Is Afraid of Systems Methodology?", in: IEEE: Systems, Man and Cybernetics Society Newsletter 4, 1 (March 1975) pp. 1–3.
- 1989, "The fractal architecture of the systems engineering method", in: Systems, Man and Cybernetics, Part C: Applications and Reviews, IEEE Transactions on Volume 28, Issue 4, Nov 1998 Page(s):565 - 572.
