= Senator Hull (disambiguation) =

Cordell Hull (1871–1955) was a U.S. Senator from Tennessee. Senator Hull may also refer to:

- George W. Hull (1870–1951), Wisconsin State Senate
- Laurens Hull (1779–1865), New York State Senate
- Morton D. Hull (1867–1937), Illinois State Senate
- T. Clark Hull (1921–1996), Connecticut State Senate
- William Hull (1753–1825), Massachusetts State Senate
