= Edward Hull (knight) =

Member of the Parliament of England

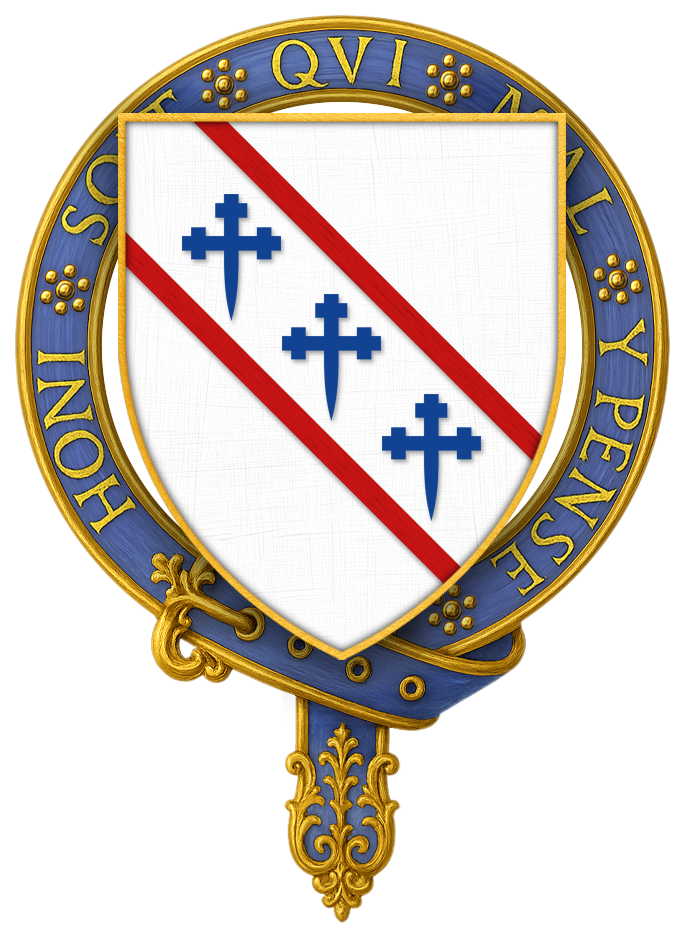
Hull's coat of arms, circumscribed by the Garter

Sir Edward Hull (c. 1410 – 17 July 1453) was an English knight who served as Constable of Bordeaux and a military commander during the Lancastrian phase of the Hundred Years' War. Born into a Lancastrian-supporting family, his parents were both members of Henry IV's royal household. Hull became close to Henry VI and his wife, Margaret of Anjou. He served on campaign in France and as an ambassador to European powers. Hull held numerous offices including as Esquire of the Body to the king, Knight of the Body and carver to the queen, a feoffee of the Duchy of Lancaster, justice of the peace and sheriff of both Somerset and Dorset, and Devon.

Hull was appointed constable of Bordeaux in Southern France in 1442, a lucrative post due to the collection of export duties on wine. Bordeaux fell to the French in May 1451 and Hull joined the force being assembled to retake the city. He left with an expedition commanded by John Talbot, 1st Earl of Shrewsbury, in summer 1452 and retook Bordeaux in October. Hull became a knight of the Order of the Garter in May 1453. Later that year he joined Talbot in an attempt to relieve the siege of Castillon but was killed in the resulting battle. In the late 1440s he was involved in a dispute with Sir John Fastolf over the ownership of Titchwell in Norfolk. A royal inquisition of 1448 seized the manor from Fastolf into Crown ownership and gave Hull a lease on a farm. After Hull's death a new lawsuit by Fastolf restored the land to his ownership.

== Early life ==
Edward Hull was born circa 1410. He was the son of John Hull, an Esquire of the Body to Henry IV of England, and Eleanor, a servant to Henry IV's wife Joan of Navarre, Queen of England and a daughter of Sir John Malet of Somerset. Hull's family were staunch supporters of Henry IV's House of Lancaster.

== Courtier ==
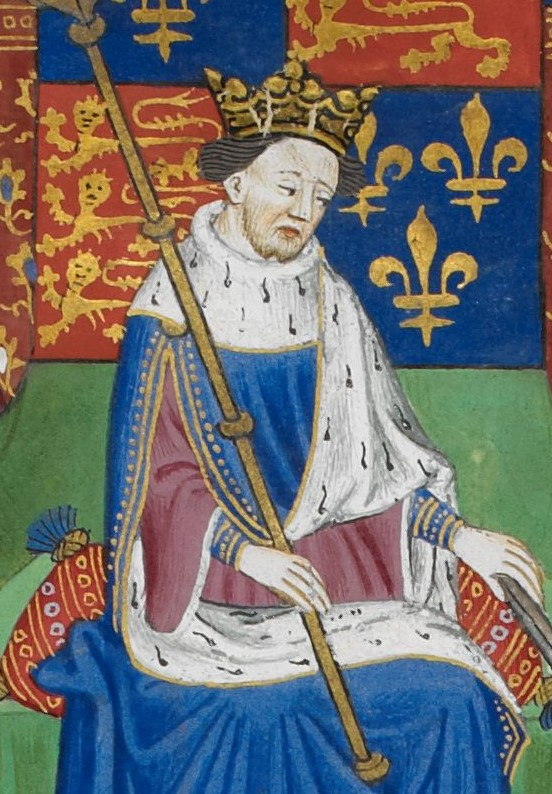
A circa 1445 depiction of Henry VI

Hull accompanied Henry VI of England to France on an expedition of 1430–32, during which Henry was crowned the titular King of France in Paris. By 1431 he was regarded as a "henchman of the Queen" (Joan). Hull fought for the king on campaign in Normandy during the 1430s as part of the Hundred Years' War. Hull accumulated royal offices and pensions. In July 1438 he was appointed an Esquire of the Body to Henry VI, receiving a pension of 50 marks a year paid from the manor of Gillingham, Dorset, and later that year was given half ownership of a ship that had been forfeited to the king. Also in 1438 he was appointed to his first term as sheriff of Somerset and Dorset. Hull was appointed a justice of the peace for Somerset on 25 March 1440.

Hull was sent to the king's territory of Aquitaine in France in 1440 but had returned to England by April 1441 when he was granted temporary control of Kenn and Kingston Seymour in Somerset, as their landowner had not yet reached the age of majority. In October 1441 he was sent on a diplomatic mission to Germany. Hull was appointed Constable of Bordeaux 17 September 1442, a role which granted considerable income from duties on the export of wine. Hull was one of the ambassadors from Henry VI to John IV, Count of Armagnac sent in October 1442 with the king's proposal of marriage to one of John's daughters.

Hull was re-appointed sheriff of Somerset and Dorset in 1443 and from that year also sat on royal commissions in that county. Hull was appointed a feoffee of the Duchy of Lancaster in November 1443, an indication that he was then among the closest circle of the royal court. By Christmas he had also become a knight of the queen's chamber. He was a member of the party that in 1444-1445 escorted Margaret of Anjou to England for her marriage to Henry VI. Hull was knighted during that expedition, at Christmas 1444. He was a Knight of the Body to Margaret at her coronation in May 1445. Hull developed a good relationship with Queen Margaret and was appointed her carver by November 1448, receiving a 40-mark annuity.

Hull remained largely in England between 1447 and 1450, leaving Bordeaux to be governed by a lieutenant. In 1447 he was elected to the House of Commons for his native Somerset, likely on the basis of his royal connections as he had spent little time in the county. In May that year Hull and his wife were granted free warren in Milton, Somerset. In 1448 he received two further ships that had been forfeited to the king. Hull was again appointed sheriff of Somerset and Dorset for the 1448–1449 term. He was appointed sheriff of Glamorgan in July 1449 and in October was granted an allowance of 50 marks per year from customs duties at Bristol. His close relationship with Henry VI led to him being exempted from the Act of Resumption 1450 which attempted to return financial independence to the king by restoring lands to the Crown that he had granted to others. In June 1451 Hull and his mother granted their interest in an annuity of 50 marks from the abbot and convent of St Albans, which had been granted to them by the king, to the recently established Eton College. He was appointed sheriff of Devon for the 1451–52 term.

== Battle of Castillon ==
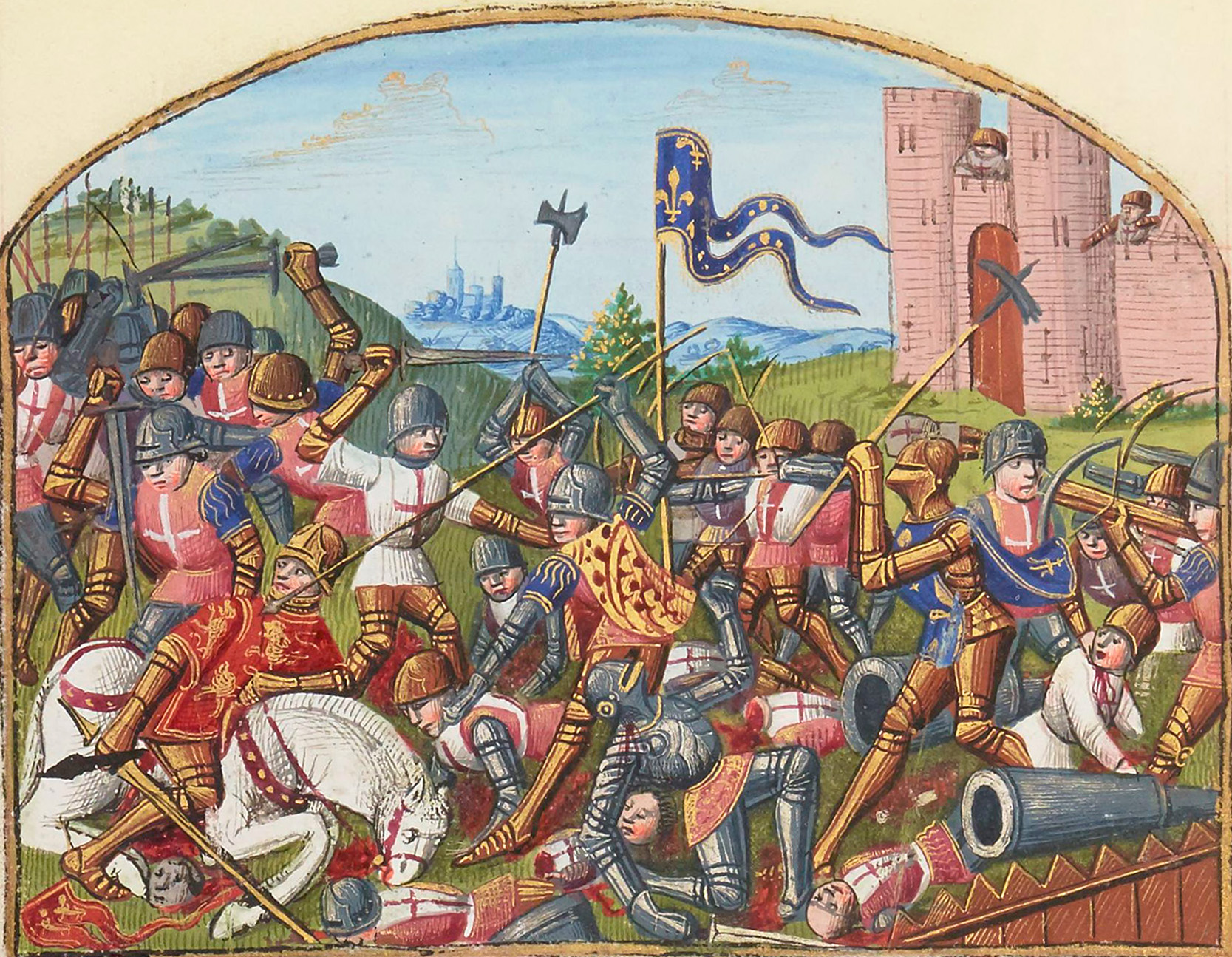
A near-contemporary depiction of Talbot's death at Castillon

In May 1451 a 7,000-man French army defeated an English force in Normandy. The French afterwards moved south and by 12 June had captured Blaye, Bourg and Bordeaux, ending Hull's tenure as constable of the latter. Hull went to defend Jersey, where he was retained by the king as part of a force to recapture the lost territories.

Hull sailed for Aquitaine in summer 1452, with a force under the command of John Talbot, 1st Earl of Shrewsbury. The French king, Charles VII, learnt of the expedition and withdrew his force to Normandy, where he expected an attack to come. Shrewsbury and Hull were therefore able to seize Bordeaux in October 1452. Early the next year Hull was reappointed constable of the city. Hull was appointed a member of the Order of the Garter in absentia in May 1453. He had previously been a squire in the order. His rivals for election included a number of other well-placed courtiers and it is thought that Hull's military career stood him in good stead.

Talbot afterwards moved to relieve the French siege of Castillon. Hull joined Talbot with a force of 2,000 of his men. Hull was one of only two English parliamentarians present with the force, perhaps reflecting a disenchantment with the war among the gentry. The other member of parliament present was John Howard (who later rose to prominence and was created Duke of Norfolk by Edward IV).

Combat was joined in the 17 July 1453 Battle of Castillon. The English force enjoyed initial success but an English charge against the French main line suffered heavy losses from artillery fire. Hull was killed, along with Talbot and his son John Talbot, 1st Viscount Lisle. The town fell to the French two days later. The French moved on Bordeaux which was taken on 19 October, ending the war. Hull had no children and his death ended the Hull family line. Though not recorded in modern sources Wedgwood and Holt (1936) note that the Short English Chronicle states that Hull was not killed at Castillon but was captured at Bordeaux and ransomed. They also state that an inquest gives his date of death as 3 September 1454. Because of his death Hull was never formally installed into the Order of the Garter.

== Titchwell dispute ==
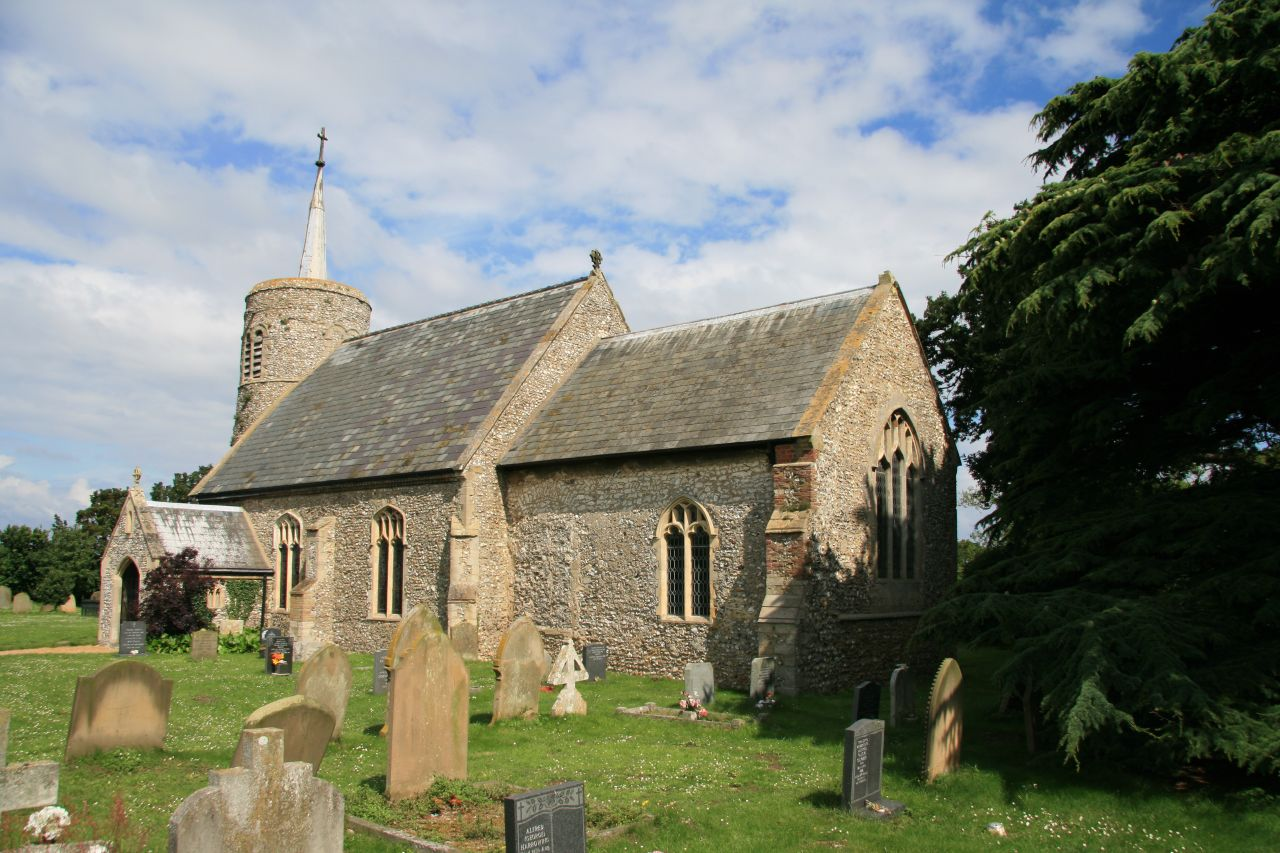
The church at Titchwell

Hull was involved in a land ownership dispute with fellow knight Sir John Fastolf. The land disputed was the manor of Titchwell in Norfolk, purchased by Fastolf circa 1431 from the widower of Margery Roys who held it by descent as a member of the Lovel family. Hull disputed Roys' right to inherit the land from his wife and to sell it to Fastolf. Hull was particularly keen to acquire Titchwell as before this point he owned no land at all. Hull claimed that his wife, Margery Lovel, whom he had married before 1441, had a claim to the land, shared with her sister Agnes who was married to Thomas Wake, under the law of entail. Hull's case was based on a claim that his wife's grandfather was a brother of Ralph Lovel of Titchwell.

A royal inquisition was held at Litcham on 30 October 1448. It found that Roys held no title to the land, which was held as a tenant-in-chief, and that it should have reverted to the Crown on his wife's death. The land was therefore seized by the king. On the basis of Hull's claim, which was possibly forged, and potentially under pressure from East Anglian magnate John Heydon the inquisition awarded Hull the lease of a farm on the land for the below-market rent of 10 marks a year.

Hull planned later legal actions to secure title to the manor as a whole for his wife and sister-in-law. Fastolf challenged the findings of the inquisition in the Court of Chancery from January 1449. Fastolf paid investigators who found that any connection between Margery and Agnes and the Lovels of Titchwell was unlikely but could not prove it. Fastolf's lawsuit then failed and by mid-1451 he had resigned himself to the loss of the manor. Hull's death in 1453 allowed Fastolf to renew proceedings. With Hull dead, Wake found he had little influence and a Chancery jury in mid-1455 found entirely in Fastolf's favour. He was assigned ownership of the manor on 1 April 1456.
