= Rice protein =

Protein isolate made from rice

Rice protein is a vegan protein isolate made from rice. It is often used as an alternative to the more common whey and soy protein isolates. To make it, brown rice is treated with enzymes that cause carbohydrates to separate from proteins. The resulting protein powder may then be flavored, and consumed with water, milk, or added to smoothies or health shakes.

Rice protein powder has a more distinctive taste than most other forms of protein powder. Like whey hydrolysate, this flavor is not effectively masked by most flavorings; however, the taste of rice protein is usually considered to be less unpleasant than the bitter taste of whey hydrolysate. This unique rice protein flavor may even be preferred to artificial flavorings by consumers of rice protein.

Rice protein is commonly mixed with pea protein powder. Rice protein is high in the sulfur-containing amino acids, cysteine and methionine, but low in lysine. Pea protein, on the other hand, is low in cysteine and methionine but high in lysine. Thus, the combination of rice and pea protein offers a superior amino acid profile that is comparable to dairy or egg proteins, but without the potential for allergies or intestinal issues that some users have with these proteins. Moreover, the light, fluffy texture of pea protein tends to smooth out the strong, chalky flavor of rice protein.
