= Arthur Hull =

Arthur Hull may refer to:

- Arthur Hull (footballer), English footballer
- Arthur Hull (percussionist), American percussionist
- Arthur Eaglefield Hull (1876–1928), English music critic, writer and composer
- Arthur Francis Basset Hull (1862–1945), Australian naturalist and philatelist

== See also ==
- Arthur Hall (disambiguation)
