= Scott Hull =

Scott Hull may refer to:

- Scott Hull (guitarist) (born 1971), American grindcore musician
- Scott Hull (engineer) (born 1962), American mastering engineer based in New York City
