= Roger Harold Hull =

Roger Harold Hull (born June 18, 1942) is the founder, chairman, and president of the Help Yourself Win Foundation. The foundation is the result of the consolidation of the Help Yourself and Schenectady-Win foundations, which Hull established. Prior to creating the Help Yourself Foundation in 2005 and the Schenectady-Win Foundation in 2017, he served for nine years as the president of Beloit College (WI) and fifteen years as President of Union College (NY) and Chancellor of Union University. Hull was also a founder and president of Avon Associates, a not-for-profit educational consulting firm.

== Early life and education ==
Born June 18, 1942, in Kew Gardens, New York, Hull is the son of Max and Magda Hull, immigrants from Nazi Germany. Hull received his bachelor's degree from Dartmouth College in 1964, his bachelor of laws degree from Yale Law School in 1967, his master's of law from the University of Virginia in 1972, and his doctor of juridical science from the University of Virginia in 1974.

== Career ==
=== Law ===
Hull began his career as a corporate attorney with White & Case in 1967. While practicing law, he worked, on weekends and during his vacation, on the gubernatorial campaign of Linwood Holton during Holton's successful run for the Governorship of Virginia in 1969. Following Holton's victory, Hull was appointed to the Board of Visitors of the College of William and Mary. Hull immediately concluded education was going to be his career and a college presidency his goal. He became special counsel to Governor Holton, where, while simultaneously administering the Governor's legislative program and serving as a political adviser, Hull obtained his degrees from the University of Virginia. Upon completion of Holton's term and the awarding of his doctorate, Hull joined the United States Department of State in 1974 and served as Special Assistant to the Chairman and Deputy Director of the National Security Council Interagency Task Force on Law of the Sea. In that capacity, he helped coordinate United States policy for the law of the sea negotiations and negotiate the marine scientific and dispute settlement provisions of the treaty.

=== Academia ===
In 1976, Hull became Vice President for Development and adjunct professor of law at Syracuse University. For five years, he successfully oversaw the University's capital campaign and the raising of funds for a number of building projects, including the Carrier Dome, while teaching international law at the law school.

Hull became the eighth president of Beloit College in 1981. During his nine years at Beloit, the College constructed or renovated 10 buildings (where he insisted on a principle of fiscal conservatism that permitted construction to begin only after funds for both the project and an endowment to maintain the finished building were obtained); grew the endowment by 500%; increased the size of the student body and faculty; introduced the concept of "moral obligation" scholarships; had, at 55%, one of the highest percentages nationally of alumni who contributed to the College; instituted intensive language programs in Arabic, Chinese, Japanese, and Russian; established the principle that any student who was admitted would have the financial ability to attend the College; and created Help Yourself, a program to bring at-risk students, beginning in third grade, to the College for an after-school program that served as the basis for the Help Yourself Foundation he established in 2005. Importantly, Hull also became, through the creation of Beloit 2000, one of the first college presidents to seek the revitalization of the town in which the college was located.

In 1990, Dr. Hull became the 17th president of Union College and chancellor of Union University. At Union, he helped raise $250 million; oversaw the construction or renovation of 24 buildings, including the iconic Nott Memorial (again, beginning a project only after funds for construction and a maintenance endowment had been pledged); tripled the College's endowment; created an undergraduate research symposium in which 15% of students presented original research; promoted student volunteer efforts in Schenectady, with 60% participation; had the largest investment in a college's "home town" as a percentage of assets ($26 million) of any college in America, which included the acquisition and renovation of 50 properties and the turning of an industrial brownfield into a greenfield; created a business incubator; established a program in Converging Technologies that brought together engineering and the liberal arts; and formed the Minerva House System, a unique learning/living environment for all faculty and students. As he had in Beloit, Hull devoted time to the city by co-founding Schenectady 2000, which, in turn, led to the revitalization of Downtown Schenectady

=== Later ===
After 15 years as president of Union College, Hull left Union to form the Help Yourself Foundation. The foundation, which seeks to take national the program for at-risk grade-school children he established at Beloit College, has programs on college campuses from Massachusetts to Wyoming.

In 2011, Hull created the Alliance Party, a combination of Democrats, Republicans, and independent voters, in an effort to combat one-party rule in Schenectady. Running as the Alliance Party's candidate for mayor, Hull lost the election by 89 votes in the closest election in Schenectady history. Hull, in 2015, ran again (and lost) the race for mayor of Schenectady.

The Schenectady-Win Foundation was created by Hull and a group of local business leaders in 2016. It takes unemployed individuals, who did not complete high school, and, over the course of 12–18 months, gives them a high school degree, life skills, construction training, and a guaranteed job upon completion of the program in an effort to take them from welfare to work.

In 2017, Hull and a group of former colleagues and college presidents formed nonprofit Avon Associates. A consulting firm, which charges only for expenses, Avon Associates provides board chairmen of colleges and universities with a forensic analysis during presidential transitions and ongoing, "no-ax-to-grind" advice to presidents of financially challenged institutions.

The Help Yourself Foundation and Schenectady-Win were consolidated to form the Help Yourself Win Foundation in 2019.{{<www.helpyourselfwin.org>}}

== Publications ==
- Donald the Don: President of the United States or Mafia Don? (Aegis Publications, 2020)
- How to Get Beyond Trump (Aegis Publications, 2020).
- 2020 Vision: Dump Trump (Aegis Publications, 2019).
- The Leader's Manual (Aegis Publications, 2017).
- Lead or Leave (Hamilton Books, 2010).
- The Irish Triangle (Princeton University Press, 1976).
- Law and Vietnam (co-authored with John Novogrod, Oceana Publications, 1968).

A frequent contributor of articles, editorials, and book reviews in newspapers and professional journals, Hull also wrote a blog for The Huffington Post.
