= Moses Hull =

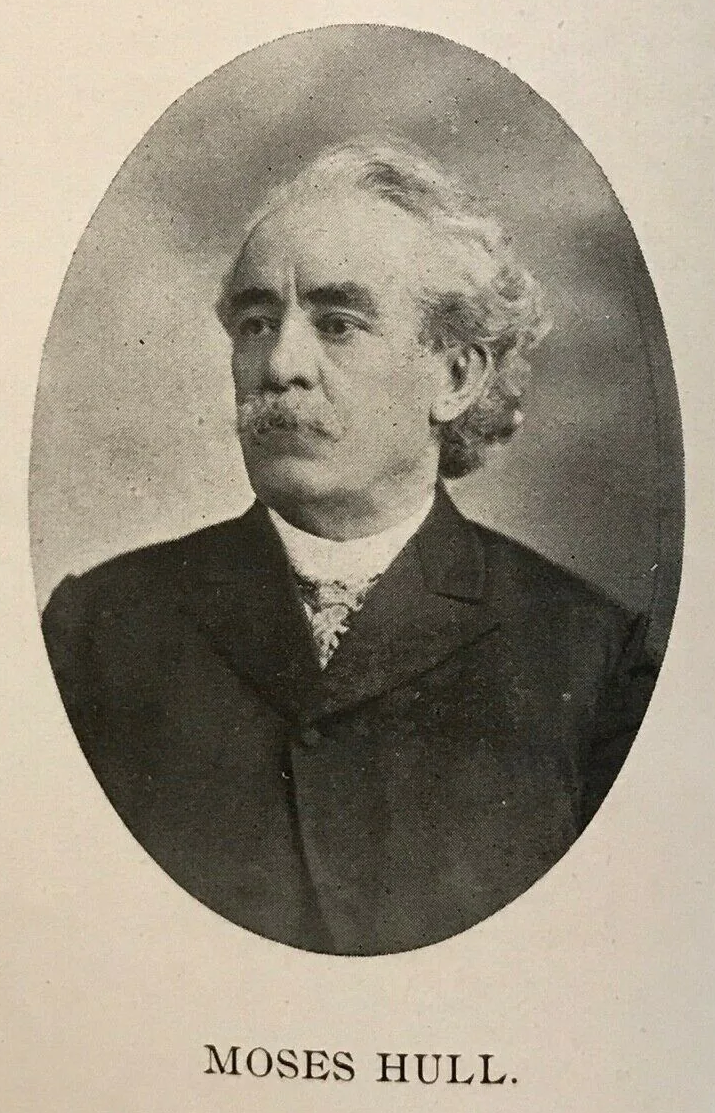
Hull c. 1902

Moses Hull (1836–1907) was a minister for the Seventh-day Adventist Church in the 19th century, who later became a Spiritualist lecturer and author.

== Biography ==
Born in Waldo, Ohio, Hull was a member of the United Brethren Church in his teens. He joined the Seventh-day Adventist Church in 1857, and became a prominent minister and debater for that denomination. In September 1863, Hull preached his last sermon as an Adventist minister.

Around this time, he turned most of energies towards the promotion of Spiritualism, specifically Christian Spiritualism, which saw spirit communication as the culmination of Christianity. He gained prominence in the movement for a series of debates with ministers, the outcome of which was evident in that the spiritualists rather than the ministers had the transcripts published. Hull became identified largely with Victoria Woodhull and the women's rights wing of the movement, which launched the Equal Rights Party campaign in 1872. Later, he became a national leader of the Greenback-Labor Party and various attempts to secure more rights for the farmers, the workers and women.

Soon after, he divorced his wife, Elvira, and married fellow spiritualist Mattie Brown Sawyer. He ran for Congress in 1906 on the ticket of the Socialist Party, and died in January 1907.
