= Mark Rowan-Hull =

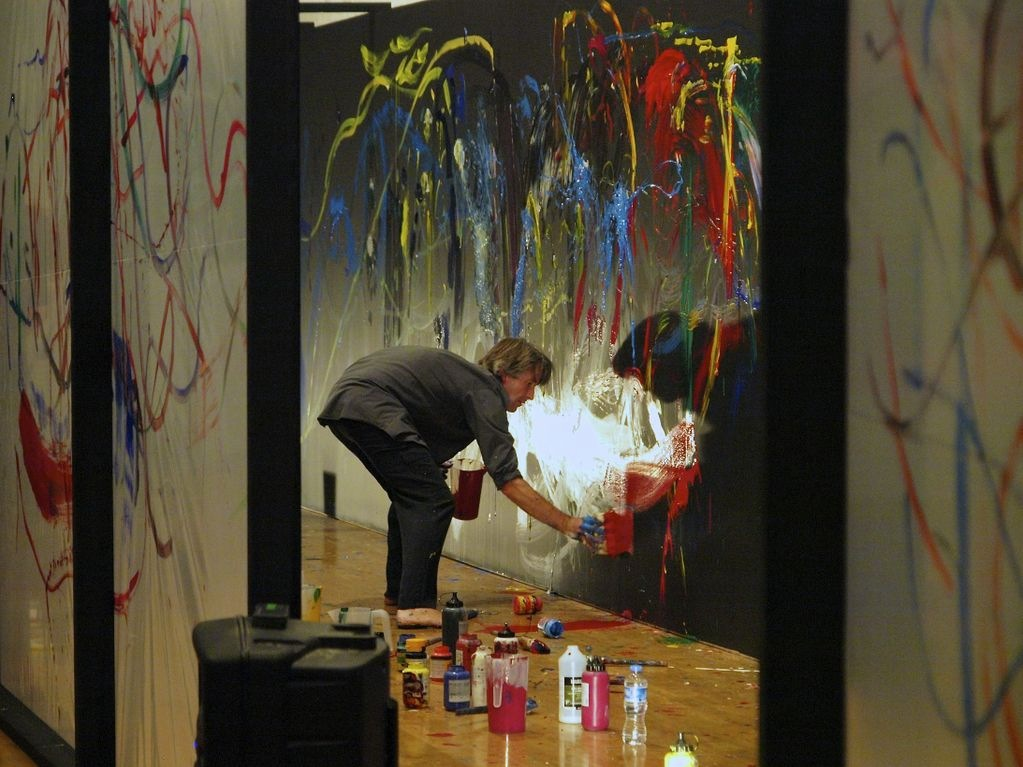
- Born: Essex, UK
- Style: Synaesthetic collaborative painting
- Website: rowan-hull.com

Mark Rowan-Hull (born 1968) is a British synaesthete performance and visual artist. He is known for creating original works of art accompanied by musicians in front of a live audience.

Rowan-Hull is also a lecturer and was a Creative Arts Fellow at Wolfson College, Oxford, from 2009-2012 and is a lifelong member of the University of Oxford. His work is included in collections at St Hugh's College, Wolfson College and Linarce College.

== Collaborations and performances ==
Rowan-Hull cites composers Arvo Pärt, Charles Ives and Olivier Messiaen as influences. In 2002 he produced two large canvases for a concert that marked the tenth anniversary of Messiaen's death at the Royal Festival Hall. He painted them in situ to the piece Messe de la Pentecôte. In 2008 he painted alongside Dame Gillian Weir at the Liverpool Metropolitan Cathedral with the organist performing selections composed by Messiaen. He also created the cover art for her CD Olivier Messiaen: The Complete Organ Works.

Rowan-Hull also frequently pairs his paintings with passages from poets such as Gerard Manley Hopkins, Seamus Heaney, Douglas Dunn and Tom Paulin.

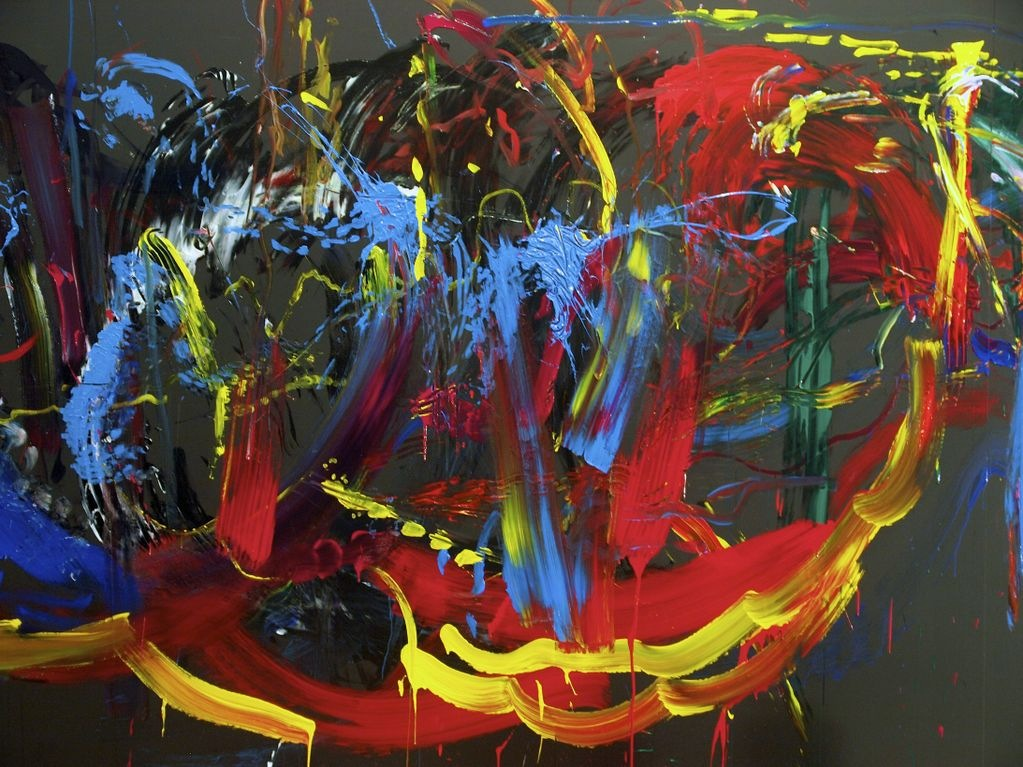
Modern Art Oxford Performance Painting

In 2003 he performed with concert pianist Helen Reid at the Music of Mind Festival held by London University and the New London Orchestra.

He performed in 2006 at the Westminster Cathedral where he painted alongside a 120-person Royal Academy of Music Symphony Orchestra led by Thierry Fischer and the Westminster Cathedral Choir directed by Martin Baker.

In 2007, he participated in the Dartington International Summer School festival and was a guest on the BBC Radio 3 programme Private Passions with composer Michael Berkeley. The same year he performed with the Coull Quartet at the Pallant House Gallery as well as the Allegri String Quartet at the Sainsbury Centre for Visual Arts in Norwich, Norfolk. He collaborated with pianist Peter Hill in 2008 for a performance at the University of Leeds Music Concert Hall.

Rowan-Hull first performed with Amit Chaudhuri in 2010 at the North Wall Arts Centre. The same year he performed at the Verbier Festival in Switzerland. Later in 2010 he co-produced a short film titled Acrylic Variations. The film featured a collaborative project with Neil Heyde and Christopher Regate of the Royal Academy of Music. Rowan-Hull painted the walls of the top floor of the Modern Art Oxford in 2011. His performance was accompanied by music from Roger Redgate and Emmanuel Lorien Spinneli. He performed at the 2015 Sequences Art Festival in Reykjavík. In October 2016, Rowan-Hull performed at the Horse Hospital in London. He was also involved in the London Frieze Festival and collaborated with singer Cleveland Watkiss.

== See also ==
- Synesthesia
- Olivier Messiaen
