= William Hull (disambiguation) =

William Hull (1753–1825) was Territorial Governor of Michigan.

William Hull may also refer to:

- Bill Hull (1940–2020), American football player
- Billy Hull (born 1912), Northern Irish loyalist activist
- William Hull (architect) (1843–1934), English architect
- William Hull (artist) (1820–1880), English landscape and still-life painter
- William Hull (MP)
- William Hull (Wisconsin politician) (1815–1881), American lawyer and politician
- William E. Hull (1866–1942), American businessman and politician
- William Lovell Hull, Canadian Christian minister
- William R. Hull Jr. (1906–1977), American politician
- William Roper Hull (1856–1925), Canadian rancher and meat packer
- William Winstanley Hull (1794–1873), English liturgist and hymnwriter

== See also ==
- William atte Hull
- William Hulle (disambiguation)
