= George Hull =

George Hull may refer to:

- George C. Hull (1878–1953), American screenwriter
- George W. Hull (1870–1951), Wisconsin state senator
- George Hull (Massachusetts politician) (1788–1868), Lieutenant Governor of Massachusetts 1836–1843
- George Hull (tobacconist), perpetrator of the Cardiff Giant hoax in 1869
