= McAllister Hull =

American theoretical physicist

McAllister Hull (September 1, 1923 – February 9, 2011) was a North American theoretical physicist who took part in the creation of the atomic bomb that was dropped over Nagasaki in 1945, ending World War II.

== Early years ==
Hull was born on September 1, 1923, in Birmingham, Alabama. In his memoir, he describes how, in his boyhood, he read Isaac Asimov, Robert Heinlein, and other science-fiction writers, and discovered physics and Albert Einstein while doing school projects.

In a 2004 letter to the New York Review of Books, Hull wrote that his father had "tried to enlist" in General John J. Pershing's expedition to bring Pancho Villa to justice, "but needed his mother’s permission, which was not given. In 1917, he did enlist, and went to France with Pershing in the 4th Alabama, where he was in combat until wounded at Soissons, and in hospital service until 1919."

In the autumn of 1941, Hull entered Mississippi State University to study physics. After his freshman year, according to a 2007 newspaper profile, "he quit school and became a draftsman for an ordnance plant, where he was trained to test explosives to see if they were pure enough to be used for shells."

== Personal ==
Hull was married for 65 years to Mary Muska Hull, who survived him. They had two children, John Hull and Wendy McCabe, and three grandchildren, Isaac Hull, Damaris McDonald and Ursula McCabe.

In 2007 he listed his pastimes as "studying serious music, theater and art history" and said that in earlier years he had been interested in "flying light planes, mountain hiking, skydiving and building furniture."

== The Army and Los Alamos ==
In 1943, Hull was drafted into the Army Specialized Training Program, which identified enlisted personnel who had technical skills or some science education. He was assigned to the Special Engineer Detachment (SED) at Oak Ridge, Tennessee.

In the autumn of 1944, Hull and three other men were ordered to take a train from Oak Ridge to Lamy, New Mexico, where Hull dialed a number he had been told to call. A bus showed up and took Hull and his companions to Los Alamos. "I never saw those men again," Hull later recalled. Although he had only a high-school diploma, he had been identified as promising student of physics. He was put to work developing methods for, and overseeing, the casting of explosive lenses which would compress a plutonium core, resulting in an implosion. Hull, a sergeant, acted as foreman, supervising the team of civilians who worked on the casting.

During the months when he worked on the project to create Fat Man, the atomic bomb that would be dropped over Nagasaki, he was not told explicitly that he was working on a bomb. "But I knew enough physics to figure out what was going on." His work, which lasted until the summer of 1945, was considered so dangerous that the lab where he worked with his team was 15 miles from the other scientists' labs.

In order to cast the explosives, according to the New York Times, Hull used candy kettles and malted-milk stirrers. "We actually used a candy kettle ... to melt the explosives and then poured them into the mold to make the lenses," Hull told MSNBC in an interview. An article in the Bulletin of the Atomic Scientists tells the story this way: "One of Hull's early assignments was to figure our how to eliminate air bubbles in the explosive lenses. Remembering his experience making milk shakes as a waiter at college, he devised a stirrer that could be drawn up through the molten mixture, effectively bringing the bubbles to the surface."

In 1995, on the 50th anniversary of the atom bomb, Hull told CBS: "We were pouring two--two-speed explosives: a slow explosive called baritar, which was barium nitrate and TNT, mainly, and then a faster explosive called Comp-B, which had TNT in it and the rest of it either classified or I don't remember. It was--it was fast." Asked by a CBS reporter whether there had been "white coats" or a "lab atmosphere," Hull replied: "Oh, Lord, no."

Hull later recalled "the day that J. Robert Oppenheimer, the director of Los Alamos, brought Gen. Leslie Groves out to the lab. While looking at the mold for the lens, Groves accidentally stepped on and disconnected a hot water line. A stream of extremely hot water came out of the socket behind him, hitting him squarely in the rear. Hull succeeded – just barely – in stifling his laughter, but only until Oppenheimer turned to him and remarked that the incident "just goes to show you the incompressibility of water." There was no way Hull could contain himself after that. (Hull was relieved that Groves did not recognize him at the Trinity test several months later.)"

Hull was still at work on Fat Man at 5:30 A.M. on July 16, 1945, when the test bomb produced by the project was detonated on the Alamogordo Bombing Range south of Los Alamos. "I was invited to go to a viewing site 20 miles away to watch," Hull later said. "It was pitch dark, and then suddenly, this brilliant light flashed, but since we were 20 miles away, we heard no sound," says Hull.

Hill later said that the biggest surprise of his life was discovering that despite "strict internal security" in the Manhattan Project, "Soviet KGB agents managed to get near enough to learn some things."

== Reflections on the morality of the bomb ==
When he was first working on Fat Man, Hull "didn't want it dropped on people," but rather wished it would be detonate "in the Tokyo Harbor or in an isolated area, to scare them. But when Hirohito didn't surrender, even after the Aug. 6 bombing of Hiroshima, we knew we had no choice." In 2007, Hull expressed hope that nuclear bombs would never be used again.

When it turned out that "the blast [over Nagasaki] was a good one," Hull said in a 1995 interview with CNN, "it was a tremendous relief. All of us felt that way. All of us felt that way. We had done it. But at the same time, immediately both of us who knew the score began to think, OK, what have we done? What have we done?...How many of us knew everything about the bomb, enough to know what its potential was? Well, a relatively small number, maybe a thousand. Maybe a few of them. So let's say a thousand just to be generous. How many people were killed — 20,000. It means I'm responsible for 400? That's the kind of arithmetic that bothers you."

"Different kinds of people worked on the Manhattan Project, from the greatest scientist in the world to the ordinary people doing ordinary things," Hull said in a 2006 interview. He also said that "[a]nyone who works on weapons has a responsibility for people who are killed with those weapons....As a consequence, I have a personal responsibility for some of those people who were killed in Nagasaki." Still, as he told a 1985 interviewer, "my colleagues and I were very pleased that our efforts had not failed....We had no idea about the tactics or the strategy of using both bombs. And today, it is still controversial whether the second bomb should have been used or whether either bomb should have been used. But that's hindsight."

Asked in a 1995 interview on CBS News Sunday Morning whether, if he could go back in time, he would participate again in the creation of the bomb, Hull said: "I would again do whatever was necessary to defend our way of life, to save the life of this country and this society, which, as difficult, as fragile and as—as flawed as it is, it's still the best the world has ever seen. That I'd—that I'd do it again. Sorry."

== Postwar career ==
After the war Hull attended Yale University, where he earned a B.S. in 1948 and a Ph.D. in 1951. He went on to teach physics at Yale for 20 years.

Hull later said that the person who had exerted the greatest professional influence upon him was Gregory Breit, the theoretical nuclear physicist who "was my mentor and friend for 20 years through my career at Yale."

He also taught at the State University of New York at Buffalo, where he was the dean of graduate and professional education, and at Oregon State University.

He moved to Albuquerque in 1977 to take up the position of provost at the University of New Mexico (UNM), where he also taught physics. He remained as provost until the mid-1980s, and retired from UNM in 1989.

Hull played an instrumental role in the establishment of UNM's optics program. He was also a strong supporter of the university's Peace Studies program. In 2007 he said that his greatest professional pride was a course he had taught "for more than 30 years" called Physics and Society. He had "hoped to promote closer relations between the arts and sciences at the University of New Mexico by creating a modern Aristotelian program recognizing the unity of knowledge. I came close, but ran out of time."

In his later years, when Hull's wife, Mary Muska Hull, began to lose her eyesight owing to macular degeneration, Hull created a device intended to improve her vision by "direct[ing] light to portions of the retina unaffected by the disease to compensate for the loss in the central vision field." Patented and marketed as the MacVision lens technology, it was put on the market in 2009 by MacVision Technologies, a joint venture by the University of New Mexico and Select Universities Technology, Inc.

Hull said in 2007 that he had never met any survivors of Hiroshima or Nagasaki. "I have had Japanese students in my courses, perhaps children of survivors, in which I discussed the bombings," he said. "The students seemed to accept the bombings as justified by the Japanese aggression."

He moved to Charleston, South Carolina, in 2007.

At the time of his death, on February 9, 2011, aged 87, he was Professor Emeritus of Physics at UNM, Former University of New Mexico Provost and professor emeriti of Physics.

== Beliefs and opinions ==
He said that his strongest belief was that "[t]here is no acceptable degree of nuclear war, for once launched, no one can control the course of it."

A reviewer wrote that "Hull's love of science permeates his memoir," and quoted him as writing: "It usually surprises me – pleasurably – when I discover that something I've worked out in theory actually works out in the real world....To paraphrase Einstein, the greatest puzzle about the universe is that we understand it!"

He told a 2006 interviewer, "I believe people in general, who are not going to be physicists, need to understand how physics affects their lives." In a letter the same year to the New York Times, reacting to a column about college education by David Brooks, Hull wrote: "The humanities without the sciences are incomplete, and the sciences without the humanities dangerous."

== Books ==
His memoir, Rider of the Pale Horse: A Memoir of Los Alamos and Beyond, co-authored with Amy Bianco, was published in 2006 by UNM Press. The title of the memoir refers to Revelation 6:8: "Behold a pale horse: and his name that sat on him was Death, and Hell followed with him."

He was also the author of a 1969 textbook, The Calculus of Physics.
