= Governor Hall =

Governor Hall may refer to:

- David Hall (Delaware politician) (1752–1817), 15th Governor of Delaware
- David Hall (Oklahoma politician) (1930–2016), 20th Governor of Oklahoma
- Sir Douglas Hall, 14th Baronet (1909–2004), Governor of British Somaliland from 1959 to 1960
- Fred Hall (1916–1970), 33rd Governor of Kansas
- Hiland Hall (1795–1885), 25th Governor of Vermont
- John Hathorn Hall (1894–1979), Governor of Aden from 1940 to 1945 and Governor of Uganda from 1945 to 1952
- John Hubert Hall (1899–1970), 24th Governor of Oregon
- John W. Hall (1817–1892), 44th Governor of Delaware
- Joshua Hall (1768–1862), 8th Governor of Maine
- Kenneth O. Hall (born 1941), 5th Governor-General of Jamaica
- Luther E. Hall (1869–1921), 35th Governor of Louisiana
- Lyman Hall (1724–1790), 13th Governor of Georgia
- Willard Preble Hall (1820–1882), 17th Governor of Missouri
- William Hall (governor) (1775–1856), 7th Governor of Tennessee
