= John H. E. Hull =

English writer

Rev. John Howarth Eric Hull (27 January 1923 – 29 November 1977) was an English writer on religion. Ordained in 1946 as a congregational minister, he held pastorates at Oakvale, Liverpool, Timperley, Cheshire and Chorlton-cum-Hardy, Manchester.

In the 1950s, Hull commenced part-time teaching of Greek and the New Testament at the Lancashire Independent College Manchester, where he had trained as a minister. From 1961 until his death in 1977, he devoted himself full-time to teaching at what then became known as the Northern Congregational College Manchester (subsequently renamed The Congregational College Manchester). Upon its formation in 1972, Hull then became a minister of the United Reformed Church.

Hull was appointed principal of the college in July 1977. He died aged 54 on 29 November 1977. His widow, Dr. Winifred Hull, a classics scholar, temporarily took over the teaching of Greek, also serving as warden of the College until a successor could be appointed.

Hull's most famous work was The Holy Spirit in the Acts of the Apostles (1967). In it, he argued that at Pentecost, the apostles only became aware of the gift of the Spirit they had already received.

== Publications ==
- The Holy Spirit in the Acts of the Apostles. Lutterworth 1967.
- The message of the New Testament. Oxford 1971.
- Understanding the Bible. 1971.
