= William Hulle (MP for Salisbury) =

English politician

William Hulle (fl. 1399) of Salisbury, Wiltshire, was an English politician.

He was a Member (MP) of the Parliament of England for Salisbury in 1399.
