= Chester Hull =

Canadian Forces officer

- Born: April 19, 1919; Edinburgh, Scotland
- Died: April 9, 2012 (aged 92); Belleville, Ontario
- Military career
- Allegiance: Canada
- Branch: Royal Canadian Air Force / Canadian Forces
- Service years: 1939-1974
- Rank: General
- Commands: RCAF Air Defence Command; RCAF Air Transport Command
- Awards: Commander of the Order of Military Merit; Distinguished Flying Cross; Canadian Forces' Decoration

Lieutenant-General A. Chester Hull CMM, DFC, CD (April 19, 1919 – April 9, 2012) was a Canadian Forces officer who became Vice Chief of the Defence Staff in Canada.

== Career ==
Hull joined the Royal Canadian Air Force and, after graduating from the Royal Military College of Canada in 1939, served in World War II as a bomber pilot with 420 squadron and then 428 Squadron before becoming Senior Operations Controller of No. 6 Group RCAF in 1944. He became Commanding Officer of RCAF Clinton in 1947, Base Commander and commander of No. 3 (Fighter) Wing at Zweibrücken and Chief of Staff of Air Defence Command in 1962. He went on to be Air Officer Commanding Air Defence Command and then Air Officer Commanding Air Transport Command before becoming Vice Chief of the Defence Staff in 1972 and retiring in 1974. He died in April 2012.

Military offices
Preceded by Michael Dare	Vice Chief of the Defence Staff; 1972-1974	Succeeded by Robert Falls
