= 2010 Canadian honours =

Canadian government recognitions

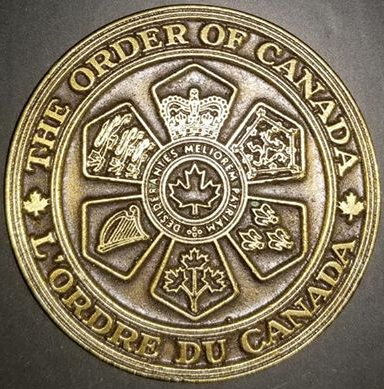
The Seal of the Order of Canada

The following are the appointments to various Canadian Honours of 2010. Usually, they are announced as part of the New Year and Canada Day celebrations and are published within the Canada Gazette during year. This follows the custom set out within the United Kingdom which publishes its appoints of various British Honours for New Year's and for monarch's official birthday. However, instead of the midyear appointments announced on Victoria Day, the official birthday of the Canadian Monarch, this custom has been transferred with the celebration of Canadian Confederation and the creation of the Order of Canada.

However, as the Canada Gazette publishes appointment to various orders, decorations and medal, either Canadian or from Commonwealth and foreign states, this article will reference all Canadians so honoured during the 2010 calendar year.

Provincial Honours are not listed within the Canada Gazette, however they are listed within the various publications of each provincial government.

== The Order of Canada ==
=== Companions of the Order of Canada ===
Undress ribbon of a Companion of the Order of Canada

- Willard S. Boyle, C.C. Willard S. Boyle, C.C.
- Joseph A. Rouleau, C.C., G.O.Q. - This is a promotion within the Order
- The Honourable Michael H. Wilson, P.C., C.C. - This is a promotion within the Order

=== Officer of the Order of Canada ===
Undress ribbon of an Officer of the Order of Canada

- Michael James Audain, O.C., O.B.C.
- Clark Blaise, O.C.
- Pierre Boivin, O.C.
- Paul Buissonneau, O.C.
- Mel Cappe, O.C.
- Burton Cummings, O.C., O.M.
- Clémence DesRochers, O.C., C.Q.
- The Honourable Gary Filmon, P.C., O.C., O.M.
- The Honourable John Frederick Hamm, O.C.
- Peter Hinton, O.C.
- Yves Jacques, O.C.
- The Honourable Philippe Kirsch, O.C.
- Shrawan Kumar, O.C.
- Mario Lemieux, O.C., C.Q.
- Jonathan Lomas, O.C.
- Alexa Ann McDonough, O.C.
- Pierre Nadeau, O.C., C.Q.
- James Orbinski, O.C., O.Ont., M.S.C.
- Gordon W. Perkin, O.C.
- Bruce Phillips, O.C.
- Guylène Proulx, O.C.
- Ivan Reitman, O.C.
- Carol Lillian Richards, O.C.
- Carol Stephenson, O.C.
- Neil Young, O.C., O.M.
- The Honourable David A. Anderson, P.C., O.C.
- Raymonde April, O.C.
- Richard B. Baltzan, O.C.
- Raymond Chrétien, O.C.
- Claudio Cuello, O.C.
- Hélène Dorion, O.C., C.Q.
- Gwynne Dyer, O.C.
- The Honourable Jake Epp, P.C., O.C.
- Michael J. Fox, O.C.
- John Furlong, O.C.
- R. Brian Haynes, O.C.
- Margaret Lock, O.C., O.Q.
- John Mighton, O.C.
- Earl Muldon, O.C.
- Julie Payette, O.C., C.Q.
- Alvin C. Segal, O.C. - This is a promotion within the Order
- Nahum Sonenberg, O.C.
- Mladen Vranic, O.C.

=== Members of the Order of Canada ===
Undress ribbon for a Member of the Order of Canada

- Murray Angus, C.M.
- The Honourable Jean Augustine, P.C., C.M.
- Elsie Basque, C.M.
- Émile Bouchard, C.M., C.Q.
- Tantoo Cardinal, C.M.
- Joan Florence Clark, C.M.
- Renée Claude, C.M.
- Calixte Duguay, C.M.
- Janet C. Gardiner, C.M.
- Judy Gingell, C.M.
- Joan Glode, C.M.
- John Charles Godel, C.M.
- S. Larry Goldenberg, C.M., O.B.C.
- Bernard Sydney Goldman, C.M.
- Patrick J. Gullane, C.M.
- Dan S. Hanganu, C.M., O.Q.
- Jean-Claude Labrecque, C.M., C.Q.
- Louise Lévesque, C.M., C.Q.
- Jeffrey C. Lozon, C.M.
- Margaret Lyons, C.M.
- Patricia Parr, C.M.
- David Kent Pecaut, C.M.
- David Adams Richards, C.M., O.N.B.
- Bruce Sanford, C.M.
- Roméo Savoie, C.M.
- Joseph A. Sealy, C.M.
- Robert W. Slater, C.M.
- Raoul Sosa, C.M.
- John Stanton, C.M.
- Wayne Strongman, C.M.
- Réjean Thomas, C.M., C.Q.
- Ian Andrew Vorres, C.M.
- Bob White, C.M.
- Georges A. Arès, C.M.
- The Honourable Lise Bacon, C.M., G.O.Q.
- Herbert C. Belcourt, C.M.
- Michel G. Bergeron, C.M., O.Q.
- Sandra Birdsell, C.M.
- Alice Chan-Yip, C.M.
- W. Edmund Clark, C.M.
- Stephen Clarkson, C.M.
- Phil Comeau, C.M.
- Adriana A. Davies, C.M.
- Abraham (Braam) de Klerk, C.M.
- Marq de Villiers, C.M.
- René Derouin, C.M., C.Q.
- Marlys A. Edwardh, C.M.
- James Ehnes, C.M.
- Étienne Gaboury, C.M.
- Clarence A. Guenter, C.M.
- Mary Jo Haddad, C.M.
- Garry Hilderman, C.M.
- Stanley J. Hughes, C.M.
- Patrick Jarvis, C.M.
- Mary Ellen Jeans, C.M.
- Donald M. Julien, C.M., O.N.S.
- Claude Laberge, C.M.
- Andrée Lortie, C.M.
- Pierre Lucier, C.M.
- James C. MacDougall, C.M.
- F. Richard Matthews, C.M.
- Alex Michalos, C.M.
- Karen Minden, C.M.
- Rita Mirwald, C.M.
- Aftab A. Mufti, C.M.
- Matilda Murdoch, C.M., O.N.B.
- Guy Nadon, C.M.
- Gordon M. Nixon, C.M., O.Ont.
- Harold (Hal) O'Leary, C.M.
- Gilles G. Patry, C.M.
- Bonnie M. Patterson, C.M., O.Ont.
- Ross H. Paul, C.M.
- Chesley D. Penney, C.M.
- Gordon L. Porter, C.M.
- Rosalind Prober, C.M.
- Simone Roach, C.M.
- Pierre Rolland, C.M.
- Walter Rosser, C.M.
- Ernesto L. Schiffrin, C.M.
- Glen Sorestad, C.M.
- Ann Southam, C.M.
- Orysia (Irene) Sushko, C.M.
- Louis Taillefer, C.M.
- Robert Holmes (R. H.) Thomson, C.M.
- David Turpin, C.M.
- Kue Young, C.M.

=== Termination of membership within the Order of Canada ===
- Renato Giuseppe Bosisio
- Lucien Larré
- Stephen Fonyo, Jr
- Frank W. Chauvin

== Order of Military Merit ==
=== Commanders of the Order of Military Merit ===
Undress ribbon for a Commander of the Order of Military Merit

- Rear-Admiral Robert Andrew Davidson, C.M.M., C.D.
- Major-General Joseph Paul André Deschamps, C.M.M., C.D.
- Major-General Peter John Devlin, C.M.M., M.S.C., C.D. - This is a promotion within the Order
- Vice-Admiral Alistair Bruce Donaldson, C.M.M., C.D.
- Major-General David Allison Fraser, C.M.M., M.S.C., M.S.M., C.D.- This is a promotion within the Order
- Brigadier-General David Charles Kettle, C.M.M., C.D.

=== Officers of the Order of Military Merit ===
Undress ribbon for an Officer of the Order of Military Merit

- Colonel David Morris Belovich, O.M.M., C.D.
- Captain (N) Joseph John Robert Richard Bergeron, O.M.M., C.D.
- Major Kevin Linus Caldwell, O.M.M., C.D.
- Major Shawn R Murray.M.M., C.D.
- Colonel Christopher John Coates, O.M.M., C.D.
- Lieutenant-Colonel Dalton James Côté, O.M.M., C.D.
- Colonel Francis Paul Crober, O.M.M., C.D.
- Colonel Michael Donald Day, O.M.M., C.D.
- Commander Christopher John Deere, O.M.M., C.D.
- Major Joseph François Daniel Gagnon, O.M.M., C.D.
- Colonel Derek William Joyce, O.M.M., C.D.
- Lieutenant-Colonel James Gérard Kile, O.M.M., C.D.
- Colonel Charles Adrien Lamarre, O.M.M., C.D.
- Lieutenant-Colonel Patrice Joseph Roger Laroche, O.M.M., C.D.
- Commodore James Roger MacIsaac, O.M.M., C.D.
- Colonel Douglas Alan Maclean, O.M.M., C.D.
- Colonel Dean James Milner, O.M.M., C.D.
- Brigadier-General Gary James Patrick O'Brien, O.M.M., M.S.C., C.D.
- Captain (N) Colin Wallace Plows, O.M.M., C.D.
- Colonel Joseph Pierre Julien St-Amand, O.M.M., C.D.
- Colonel Christopher Calvin Thurrott, O.M.M., M.S.M., C.D.
- Colonel Robert Schuman Williams, O.M.M., M.S.M., C.D.

=== Members of the Order of Military Merit ===
Undress ribbon for a Member of the Order of Military Merit

- Master Warrant Officer Jeffrey Charles Lorne Aman, M.M.M., C.D.
- Captain Dwayne William Atkinson, M.M.M., C.D.
- Master Warrant Officer John Gerard Barnes, M.M.M., C.D.
- Sergeant Alain André Joseph Barriault, M.M.M., C.D.
- Petty Officer 1st Class Stephen Beastall, M.M.M., C.D.
- Chief Warrant Officer Gary Bradley Biggar, M.M.M., C.D.
- Warrant Officer Charles David Brady, M.M.M., C.D.
- Chief Petty Officer 2nd Class Cheryl Dawn Bush, M.M.M., C.D.
- Master Warrant Officer Dale William Coble, M.M.M., C.D.
- Chief Petty Officer 2nd Class Austin Joseph Collett, M.M.M., C.D.
- Warrant Officer Edward William Dallow, M.M.M., C.D.
- Master Warrant Officer Thaddeous Bernard D'Andrade, M.M.M., C.D.
- Sergeant Sandra Ann Dansereau, M.M.M., C.D.
- Master Warrant Officer André Joseph Lucien Demers, M.M.M., C.D.
- Chief Warrant Officer Joseph Léopold Mario Dion, M.M.M., C.D.
- Master Warrant Officer Dany Joseph Joël Dubuc, M.M.M., C.D.
- Master Warrant Officer Elizabeth Marguerite Dunsmore, M.M.M., C.D.
- Captain Jason Brent English, M.M.M., C.D.
- Chief Petty Officer 2nd Class Michael David Fairfex, M.M.M., C.D.
- Master Warrant Officer Pierre Joseph Frenette, M.M.M., C.D.
- Chief Warrant Officer Joseph René Raoul Stéphane Guy, M.M.M., C.D.
- Warrant Officer Kelly Todd Grant, M.M.M., C.D.
- Chief Petty Officer 2nd Class Gilles André Grégoire, M.M.M., C.D.
- Chief Warrant Officer Joseph Sandor Gyuk, M.M.M., C.D.
- Sergeant Thomas William Hale, M.M.M., C.D.
- Major Marie Gisèle Carmen Hamel, M.M.M., C.D.
- Captain Peter William Hamilton, M.M.M., C.D.
- Chief Warrant Officer Stuart Gordon Hartnell, M.M.M., C.D.
- Chief Warrant Officer Tom Carl Hennessey, M.M.M., C.D.
- Captain Lewis Edwin Irvine, M.M.M., C.D.
- Master Warrant Officer James Robert Jeckell, M.M.M., C.D.
- Captain Lennard Mark Johnston, M.M.M., C.D.
- Warrant Officer Lewis Harry Johnstone, M.M.M., C.D.
- Master Warrant Officer Raymond Chester King, M.M.M., C.D.
- Master Warrant Officer Roger William King, M.M.M., C.D.
- Sergeant Manon Gina Langlois, M.M.M., C.D.
- Master Warrant Officer Michel Joseph Sylva Lavallée, M.M.M., C.D.
- Captain Patrick Joseph Lee, M.M.M., C.D.
- Chief Petty Officer 2nd Class Thomas Allan Lizotte, M.M.M., C.D.
- Warrant Officer Patrick Timothy Love, M.M.M., C.D.
- Chief Warrant Officer Kenneth Charles Lutz, M.M.M., C.D.
- Captain Donna Anne MacAulay, M.M.M., C.D.
- Chief Warrant Officer Donald Alexander MacIsaac, M.M.M., C.D.
- Major Leslie Robert Mader, M.M.M., C.D.
- Chief Petty Officer 2nd Class Bradley James Main, M.M.M., C.D.
- Master Warrant Officer Kevin James Mathers, M.M.M., C.D.
- Chief Warrant Officer Michael Lawrence McDonald, M.S.C., M.M.M., C.D.
- Chief Petty Officer 2nd Class Eric Rudyard Meredith, M.M.M., C.D.
- Master Warrant Officer Marie Carole Fernande Monsigneur, M.M.M., C.D.
- Warrant Officer Lawrence Russell Mullen, M.M.M., C.D.
- Master Warrant Officer Sean Joseph Murphy, M.M.M., C.D.
- Petty Officer 2nd Class Peter Francis Neville, M.M.M., C.D.
- Chief Warrant Officer André Joseph Gérald Normandin, M.M.M., C.D.
- Chief Warrant Officer Marc André Joseph Pelletier, M.M.M., C.D.
- L'adjudant-chef Marc André Joseph Pelletier, M.M.M., C.D.
- Master Warrant Officer David Charles Phillips, M.M.M., C.D.
- Warrant Officer Stephen Glen Piccolo, M.M.M., C.D.
- Captain Peter Joseph Pitcher, M.M.M., C.D.
- Captain Lorne Benedict Plemel, M.M.M., C.D.
- Sergeant (Canadian Ranger) Markussie Qinuajuak, M.M.M., C.D.
- Chief Warrant Officer Joseph Ramsay, M.M.M., C.D.
- Master Warrant Officer Glen Richard Rideout, M.M.M., C.D.
- Chief Warrant Officer Pedro Eduardo Rosa, M.M.M., C.D.
- L'adjudant-chef Pedro Eduardo Rosa, M.M.M., C.D.
- Warrant Officer Claudette Jacqueline Saunders, M.M.M., C.D.
- Petty Officer 1st Class Patrick James Johannes Saunders, M.M.M., C.D.
- Chief Warrant Officer Michael Gerald Scarcella, M.M.M., C.D.
- Petty Officer 1st Class Cavel Thomas Shebib, M.M.M., C.D.
- Chief Warrant Officer Anthony James Slack, M.M.M., C.D.
- Master Warrant Officer Roland Wavel Smith, M.M.M., C.D.
- Master Warrant Officer Jennifer Lynne Ste-Croix, M.M.M., C.D.
- Sergeant Yan St-Pierre, M.M.M., C.D.
- Captain Jean-Yves Taschereau, M.M.M., C.D.
- Master Warrant Officer Sharman Patrick Thomas, M.M.M., C.D.
- Chief Petty Officer 1st Class Luc Joseph Royal Tremblay, M.M.M., C.D.
- Master Warrant Officer Pierre Joseph Richard Tremblay, M.M.M., C.D.
- L'adjudant-maître Pierre Joseph Richard Tremblay, M.M.M., C.D.
- Chief Petty Officer 2nd Class Charles Melvin Frederick Trombley, M.M.M., C.D.
- Master Warrant Officer Donald Wellesley Tupper, M.M.M., C.D.
- Captain Darren Edward Turner, M.M.M., C.D.
- Warrant Officer Michael Bernard Vandepol, M.M.M., C.D.
- Chief Warrant Officer Armand Joseph Simon Vinet, M.M.M., C.D.
- Sergeant Leslie James Wilson, M.M.M., C.D.
- Chief Petty Officer 2nd Class Kevin Allen Woods, M.M.M., C.D.
- Major John Garnet Zoellner, M.M.M., C.D.
- Captain Roland Gregory Zwicker, M.M.M., C.D.

== Order of Merit of the Police Forces ==
=== Commander of the Order of Merit of the Police Forces ===
Undress ribbon of a Commander of the Order of Merit of the Police Forces

- Assistant Director General Steven Chabot

=== Officers of the Order of Merit of the Police Forces ===
Undress ribbon of an Officer of the Order of Merit of the Police Forces

- Deputy Commissioner Lawrence Graham Beechey
- Chief Constable Jamie Hamilton Graham
- Deputy Commissioner J. V. N. (Vincent) Hawkes
- Deputy Commissioner Christopher D. Lewis - This is a promotion within the Order
- Assistant Commissioner Robert Wilfred Paulson - This is a promotion within the Order
- Inspector Joseph Lance Valcour

=== Members of the Order of Merit of the Police Forces ===
Undress ribbon of a Member of the Order of Merit of the Police Forces

- Chief Keith John Atkinson
- Superintendent Bradley Blair
- Staff Sergeant Murray Elijah Brown
- Sergeant John William Burchill
- Chief Constable Douglas James Cessford
- Sergeant G. Shawn Coady, C.D.
- Deputy Chief Constable John Alexander Ducker
- Chief Inspector André Fortin
- Corporal Christopher G. Gosselin
- Sergeant Stewart C. Kellock, C.D.
- Assistant Commissioner Wayne Alexander Lang
- Ms. Brenda Lawson
- Chief Barry D. MacKnight
- Chief Superintendent William Fraser MacRae
- Deputy Chief Michael S. Mann
- Superintendent H. Alfred Niedtner
- Inspector André Péloquin
- Deputy Chief John Allan Redford
- Inspector Ronald 'Dean' Robinson
- Constable Tom Stamatakis
- Director Marc St-Laurent
- Deputy Chief Constable Stephen C. Sweeney
- Detective Sergeant James Arthur Van Allen

=== Termination of appointment within the Order ===
- Sergeant Warren S. Gherasim

== Royal Victorian Order ==
Undress ribbon for all grades of the Royal Victorian Order

=== Commander of the Royal Victorian Order ===
- Sheila-Marie Cook
- Dwight MacAulay - This is a promotion within the Order

Dwight MacAulay (July 4, 2010)

=== Lieutenant of the Royal Victorian Order ===
- Raymond Novak

=== Member of the Royal Victorian Order ===
- Bernard Corrigan
- Sylvie Gervais
- Terry Guillon
- Caroline Marchildon
- Christopher McCreery
- Isabelle McLeod
- Lieutenant-Commander Scott Nelson
- Madeleine Rinfret-Moore
- Florence Sassine

== Most Venerable Order of the Hospital of St. John of Jerusalem ==
Undress ribbon for all grades of the Most Venerable Order of the Hospital of St. John of Jerusalem

=== Bailiff Grand Cross of the Order of St. John ===
- John Chew Mah, C.D. - This is a promotion within the Order

=== Knights and Dames of the Order of St. John ===
- The Honourable Philip S. Lee, C.M., O.M.
- Frederick Richard Bruce, M.O.M.
- Her Honour, the Honourable Ann Meekitjuk Hanson
- Her Honour, the Honourable Geraldine Van Bibber
- His Honour, the Honourable Anthony Wilfred James Whitford
- Lesley Robert Chipperfield
- Joyce Rose Hart
- Lieutenant-Commander (Retired) Darin Edward Reeves, C.D.
- Honorary Lieutenant Colonel Solomon J. Rolingher
- Rear Admiral (Retired) Robert Dmytro Yanow, C.D.
- Colin Borden Bachynski
- Sharon E. Cole
- Lieutenant Colonel (Retired) Arthur Richard William Jordan, C.D.
- Marc Jutras
- Raymond L. Roberts, C.D.

=== Commanders of the Order of St. John ===
- Lieutenant Colonel (Retired) Jeffrey Robert Cairns, C.D.
- Claire Cecilia Campbell
- Major (Retired) Jean-Robert Gagnon, C.D.
- Lieutenant (N) David M. Connelly, C.D.
- Lieutenant-Commander (Retired) Peter B. Ferst, C.D.
- Belinda Mary Mitchell
- Captain Leslie Jack Patten, C.D.
- Jordy Reichson
- Major Justin P.K. Schmidt-Clever, C.D.
- Kenneth Ross Turriff, Bridgewater, A.D.C.
- Honorary Colonel Robert Harold Vandewater

=== Officers of the Order of St. John ===
- Douglas Anthony Alberts
- Christian Beaulieu
- Judith Ann Belding
- André Bilodeau
- Jean K. Chute
- Patrick Thomas Cureton
- Trevor James Day
- Robert P. Doyle
- Donald Drover
- Constable Paul E. Dunford
- Nancy Elliott-Greenwood
- Patrick David Flynn
- Frederika E. M. Gibson
- David John Griffiths
- David Norman Schofield Harris, C.D.
- Vivian Carole Hould
- Ian Alan Knightbridge
- Frank Ferguson Lawson
- Colonel Thomas Charles Ray Lawson
- André Lepage
- Major Rick Maxwell Lewis
- William Masson
- Christopher McCreery
- Richard Andrew Muller
- Francis Aloysius O'Reilly
- Captain Brian James Patterson
- Darlene Violet Perkins
- Catherine Scollay
- Mark T. Walker
- Philip Clarke
- Honorary Captain Lionel José Goffart
- Major (Retired) Victor M. Knowlton, C.D.
- Andrew James Philpot
- Ronald Richard

=== Members of the Order of St. John ===
- José Carlos Alves
- Gloria Ruth Armstrong
- Laura J. Assinck
- Hortense Audet
- Gail Louise Bailey
- Frank Beals
- William George Beatty
- David Bélanger
- Hazel Ann Blundell
- Jesse Shane Boszormeny
- Pierre Boudreault
- James W. Brown
- Lynn Carter
- Sheila H. Carter
- Alan Wai-Lap Chan
- Daniel Jon Chevrier
- Warrant Officer Robert Graham Clark, C.D.
- Sylvain Cloutier(posthumously)
- Geoffrey Alan Collins
- Mary Clare Courtland
- Henri Cyr
- Bernard Deschênes
- Kevin Despot
- Stephen Douglas Devine
- Élizabeth Dougherty
- Bruce M. England
- André Fournier
- Celine Froment
- Natalie Fyke
- Jean-Philippe Gadbois
- Denis Gendreau
- Stéphane Gignac
- Sylvie Goneau
- Joanne Claire Green
- Captain Ronald Larry Green, C.D.
- Nigel Robert Gumley
- Chief Petty Officer 1st Class (Retired) Peter Michael Hagan, C.D.
- George Kenneth Hammond
- Corporal Keith R. Hendricks
- Ronald Eugene Henshaw
- Ryan Bradford Hoogendoorn
- Claudette Houle
- Nancy L. Hughes
- Joerg Andreas Huth
- Robert Douglas Ingram
- Mohamed Jama
- Marthe Jean
- Windie-Lee Jeider
- Captain Alfred Carl King, C.D.
- Sandra Lynn Ladd
- Master Corporal Marie Corinne Nadine Laflamme, C.D.
- Travis Ryan Lanoway
- Sean Large
- Glen Allan Larson
- Benedict Wan Chiu Lau
- Lieutenant Candice Leigh Levesque
- Margaret Jessie Manson
- Colonel Steven Craig McQuitty
- Claudia Maria Naaykens
- John Michael Prno
- Nicole Suzanne Renkema
- Inspector John Paul Richards
- Debra Lynn Robertson
- Major General Walter Semianiw
- Mohammad Imran Shamsi
- Denise Ann Smith
- Angeline Tham
- Stacey L. Timmons
- Brigadier General (Retired) Kevin Gerald Troughton, C.D.
- Mervin Wayne Unger
- Jonathan Campbell Warren
- Dorothy Florence Watson
- Helen Whitehead
- Captain Michael Richard Wionzek, C.D.
- Kenneth Walter Bilicki
- Captain Élise Corriveau
- Alexander De Zordo
- Jean Fournier, C.M., C.Q.
- Gordon D. Frowen
- Steven D. Gaetz
- Heather Elizabeth Hayne
- Peter William R. Hogan, A.D.C.
- Sandra M. Karr
- Nicole Elizabeth Knee
- Darwin Lai
- Alain L. J. Laurencelle
- Hong Ting Law
- Kevin Gee Keung Li
- Annette Yvonne Lumbis
- Serge Henry Joseph Malaison
- Kevin Robert Edward McCormick
- Assistant Commissioner (Retired) Darrell Wesley McFadyen
- Kellie Mitchell
- Stacie Lee Osborne
- Jules Pinard, A.D.C.
- Wansey Poon
- Patricia Ann Skjolde

== Provincial Honours ==
=== National Order of Québec ===
==== Grand Officers of the National Order of Québec ====
Undress ribbon for a Grand Officer of the National Order of Québec

- Jean Béliveau, C.C., G.O.Q.
- Monique Mercure, C.C., G.O.Q.

==== Honorary Officer ====
- James H. DOUGLAS, O.Q

==== Officers of the National Order of Québec ====
Undress ribbon for an Officer of the National Order of Québec

- Maryse ALCINDOR, O.Q.
- Camille DAGENAIS, C.C., O.Q.
- Bernard DESCÔTEAUX, O.Q.
- René DUSSAULT, O.Q.
- Louise FORAND-SAMSON, O.Q.
- Dr. Jean-Claude FOURON, O.Q.
- Roger FRAPPIER, O.Q.
- Raymond GARNEAU, O.C., O.Q.
- Élaine HÉMOND, O.Q.
- L. Jacques MÉNARD, O.C., O.Q.
- Clément RICHARD, O.Q.
- Richard TREMBLAY, O.Q.

==== Knight of the National Order of Québec ====
Undress ribbon for a Knight of the National Order of Québec

- Léonard AUCOIN, C.Q.
- Neil BISSOONDATH, C.Q.
- Huguette BOILARD, C.Q.
- Robert CHICOINE, C.Q.
- Christine COLIN, C.Q.
- Roland DORÉ, O.C., C.Q.
- Richard G. GERVAIS, C.Q.
- Renée HUDON, C.Q.
- François-Mario LABBÉ, C.Q.
- Michel LOUVAIN, C.Q.
- Sister Andrée MÉNARD, C.Q.
- Wajdi Mouawad, O.C., C.Q.
- Mona NEMER, C.Q.
- Jacques PERREAULT, C.Q.
- Claudine ROY, C.Q.
- Hubert SACY, C.Q.
- Donat SAVOIE, C.Q.
- Larry SMITH, C.Q.
- Angèle ST-YVES, C.Q.
- Yuli TUROVSKY, C.Q.

=== Saskatchewan Order of Merit ===
Undress ribbon for a member of the Saskatchewan Order of Merit

- Maurice (Mo) Bundon, S.O.M.
- Donald E. Kramer, S.O.M., LL.D. (1926-2018)
- Dr. Janice MacKinnon, C.M., S.O.M.
- Dr. J.D. (Jack) Mollard, O.C., S.O.M., LL.D.
- Elizabeth Raum, S.O.M.
- Dr. Douglas A. Schmeiser, S.O.M., Q.C. (1934-2018)
- Myrna F. Yuzicapi, S.O.M

=== Order of Ontario ===
Undress ribbon for a member of the Order of Ontario

- Suhayya Abu-Hakima
- Russell Bannock
- Gail Beck
- Joseph Chin
- Lynn Factor
- Gerald Fagan
- Nigel Fisher
- Jacques Flamand
- Lillie Johnson
- Ignat Kaneff
- Mobeenuddin Hassan Khaja
- Elizabeth Ann Kinsella
- Huguette Labelle
- Elizabeth Le Geyt
- Clare Lewis
- Louise Logue
- Gordon McBean
- Wilma Morrison
- James Orbinski
- Coulter Osborne
- Chris Paliare
- Gilles G. Patry
- Dave Shannon
- Molly Shoichet
- Howard Sokolowski
- Edward Sonshine
- Reginald Stackhouse
- David Staines
- Martin Teplitsky
- Dave Toycen
- John Ronald Wakegijig
- Elizabeth Hillman Waterston

=== Order of British Columbia ===
Undress ribbon for a member of the Order of British Columbia

- Jacob (Jack) Austin;
- Chief Tony Hunt;
- Dr. Robert Brunham;
- Barbara Ward-Burkitt;
- Dr. Julio Montaner;
- Dan Doyle;
- Brad Bennett;
- Marco Marra;
- John Furlong;
- Robert (Bob) Hindmarch;
- Patricia (Patti) Leigh;
- Pauline Hilistis Waterfall;
- Christopher Rose;
- Frankie Edroff;
- Milan Ilich

=== Alberta Order of Excellence ===
Undress ribbon for a member of the Alberta Order of Excellence

=== Order of Prince Edward Island ===
Undress ribbon for a member of the Order of Prince Edward Island

=== Order of Manitoba ===
Undress ribbon for a member of the Order of Manitoba

=== Order of New Brunswick ===
Undress ribbon for a member of the Order of New Brunswick

=== Order of Nova Scotia ===
Undress ribbon for a member of the Order of Nova Scotia

=== Order of Newfoundland and Labrador ===
Undress ribbon for a member of the Order of Newfoundland and Labrador

== Military Valour Decorations ==
=== Star of Military Valour ===
Undress ribbon for the Star of Military Valour

- WARRANT OFFICER DAVID GEORGE SHULTZ, S.M.V., C.D.
- MASTER CORPORAL JEREMY PINCHIN, S.M.V.

=== Medal of Military Valour ===
Undress ribbon for the Medal of Military Valour

- MASTER CORPORAL MICHAEL C. J. BURSEY, M.M.V.
- SERGEANT MARTIN JOSEPH JEAN CÔTÉ, M.M.V., C.D.
- WARRANT OFFICER ROBIN JOHN CRANE, M.M.V., C.D.
- CORPORAL TYLER BRIAN MYRONIUK, M.M.V.
- CORPORAL MARK C. W. EJDRYGIEWICZ, M.M.V.
- MASTER CORPORAL BRENT W. L. GALLANT, M.M.V.
- SERGEANT Shawn Murray, M.M.V., C.D.
- SERGEANT JAYSON WILLIAM KAPITANIUK, M.M.V.
- CORPORAL JORDAN E. KOCHAN, M.M.V.
- MASTER CORPORAL PAUL D. RACHYNSKI, M.M.V.
- CORPORAL ANTHONY J. R. ROTONDI, M.M.V.
- WARRANT OFFICER DALE MILTON VERGE, M.M.V., C.D.
- CORPORAL RICHARD L. ANDERSON, M.M.V.
- CORPORAL MARK ROBERT MCLAREN, M.M.V.
- CORPORAL JOSHUA O'TOOLE, M.M.V.
- MASTER CORPORAL DAVID RICHARD TEDFORD, M.M.V., C.D.
- MASTER CORPORAL MICHAEL TRAUNER, M.M.V.
- WARRANT OFFICER MICHAEL WILLIAM JACKSON, M.M.V., C.D.
- MASTER CORPORAL PAUL ALEXANDER MUNROE, M.M.V., C.D.
- MASTER CORPORAL JEREMY JOSEPH JAMES LEBLANC, M.M.V.

== Canadian Bravery Decorations ==
=== Star of Courage ===
Undress ribbon for the Star of Courage

- Sergeant Bryant Wood
- Casey Marie Peirce
- Alexander Bruce Scott
- Miguel Gonzalez
- Luc Paquette
- Miranda Suggitt
- Michael Thomas Westwell

=== Medal of Bravery ===
Undress ribbon for the Medal of Bravery

- Jimmy Victor Beardy
- Lieutenant Denis Beaulieu
- Constable Patrick Benoit
- Terry Bratton
- Gary Victor Brown
- Ryan Sterling Burry
- Benjamin Loren Correos (posthumous)
- Louis-Paul Courbron
- Constable Frédéric Couture
- Elaine Dare
- Dean R. DeJoseph
- Frédérick Dionne
- James Donovan
- Frédéric Dufresne
- Kimberly Friesen
- Kimpton Gagnon-Després
- Michel Harvey
- Raphaël Harvey Bérard
- Norbert Hébert
- Jeffrey Hopkins
- RCMP Constable Michelle Allison Knopp
- Shawn Joseph Lahey
- Alexis Laliberté
- Leading Seaman Roxanne Anneke Lalonde (posthumous)
- Sergeant Roger Chadwick Lane
- Constable Martin Langlois
- Paul Linklater
- Gillian Irene MacAulay
- Chris MacLeod
- Sylvain Joseph Marcoux
- Guillaume Massé
- Scott Lee Joseph Moody (deceased)
- Yves Pilotte (posthumous)
- Hady Quan (posthumous)
- Constable Sean Ralph
- Constable Alain Rochette
- Tanya Silveira
- Cody Brian Sloot
- Tommy Thériault
- Tanya Lee Waldriff
- Michael Braden Walker
- Sergeant Bryant Wood
- David H. R. Byrd
- Michael D. Byrd
- Thomas James Dodd (posthumous)
- Robert Edward Dorie
- Robin Fabiani
- Constable Michael Verney Gallant
- Constable Phillip Kolody
- Doug Knill
- Samantha-Joe Larose
- Bruce Lavallee
- Donald Morrison
- Marc Patterson
- Stuart Pringle
- Corporal Gabriel Proulx
- Francis Quevillon
- Constable Dale George Sleightholme
- Constable Paul Allan Spencelayh
- Mike André Toupin
- Daniel White
- Sergeant B. John Ayers
- Leading Seaman Robert T. Binder (deceased)
- Steve Blake
- Dale Brady
- Shane Michael Doucette
- Constable Lionel Girault
- Sergeant Michael Johnston
- Master Corporal David Frederick Taylor King, C.D.
- Sergeant Patrick Lalonde
- Guy Lavoie
- Able Seaman Jaret A. McQueen
- Constable Jean Milliard
- Constable Cal Traversy
- Constable Clifford Watson
- Andrea Wiznuk
- Constable Nick Bell
- Lieutenant-Colonel Douglas Wynn Baird, C.D.
- Constable Robert Bérubé
- Scott Borlase
- Joseph Henry Roland Bouliane
- Constable Benoit Brissette
- John Peter Chatterton
- Sergeant Steve Desgagné
- Daisy Flamand
- Richard Frauley
- Jared Douglas Gagen
- Isabelle Gagnon
- Master-Corporal Julien Gauthier
- Major William Robertson Green, C.D.
- Blair William Allan Hocking
- Sergeant Joseph André Hotton, M.B.∗, C.D. - This is a second award of this decoration
- Ernest Jean
- Marjorie Jean-Baptiste
- Tim Kautaq
- RCMP Constable Alfred Douglas Lavallee
- Thomas Manuel
- Warren Bruce Miller
- Pascale Pelletier
- Sergeant Joseph Kenneth Penman
- Michaël Perreault Giroux
- Stephen Power
- Master Warrant Officer Hamish Jackson Seggie, C.D.
- Warrant Officer Shaun Spence, C.D.
- Edward Stirling
- Tami Elizabeth Strickland
- Constable Wayne Thompson
- Philippe Tremblay
- Art Unruh
- Chad Verch
- William Watt
- Abebe Yohannes
- Hermann Zarbel

== Meritorious Service Decorations ==
=== Meritorious Service Cross (Military Division) ===
Undress ribbon for Meritious Service Cross in the military division

- COMMANDER CRAIG ALAN BAINES, M.S.C., C.D.
- LIEUTENANT-GENERAL HANS-OTTO BUDDE, M.S.C. of the German Army
- GENERAL BANTZ JOHN CRADDOCK, M.S.C. of the United States Army
- REAR-ADMIRAL ROBERT ANDREW DAVIDSON, M.S.C., C.D.
- MASTER WARRANT OFFICER RODNEY ALBERT DEARING, M.S.C., C.D.
- COMMANDER PIERRE CHRISTOPHE DICKINSON, M.S.C., C.D.
- SERGEANT SHAWN E. HARRISON, M.S.C., C.D.
- LIEUTENANT-GENERAL JOSEPH GUY MARC LESSARD, C.M.M., M.S.C., C.D.
- WARRANT OFFICER JOHN ROBERT MCNABB, M.S.C., C.D.
- LIEUTENANT-COLONEL DARRYL ALBERT MILLS, M.S.C., C.D.
- CHIEF WARRANT OFFICER GIOVANNI MORETTI, M.M.M., M.S.C., C.D.
- GENERAL VICTOR EUGENE RENUART, Jr., M.S.C., of the United States Air Force
- BRIGADIER-GENERAL DENIS WILLIAM THOMPSON, O.M.M., M.S.C., C.D.
- SERGEANT NICHOLAS SAMUEL JAMES DERIGER, M.S.C., C.D.
- SERGEANT DARRELL LAWRENCE SPENCE, M.S.C., C.D.
- LIEUTENANT-COLONEL DANA JEFFREY WOODWORTH, M.S.C., C.D.
- SERGEANT JOSEPH MARTIN BRINK, M.S.C.
- BRIGADIER-GENERAL JOSEPH RENÉ MARCEL GUY LAROCHE, O.M.M., M.S.C., C.D.

=== Meritorious Service Medal (Military Division) ===
Undress ribbon for the Meritious Service Medal in the military division

- MAJOR JAMES EDWARD ALLEN, M.S.M., C.D.
- CHIEF WARRANT OFFICER SHEILA ALAINE BLAIR, M.M.M., M.S.M., C.D.
- COLONEL JOSEPH PATRICK BREEN, M.S.M. of the United States Air Force
- WARRANT OFFICER TODD BARRY BUCHANAN, M.S.M., C.D.
- COLONEL JAMIESON CADE, M.S.M., C.D.
- COLONEL GORDON DAVID CORBOULD, M.S.M., C.D.
- MAJOR-GENERAL JONKHEER J. HARMEN DE JONGE, M.S.M. Royal Netherlands Army
- MAJOR MICHAEL ROY DEUTSCH, M.S.M., C.D.
- COLONEL JEAN-PIERRE DURAN, M.S.M.
- WARRANT OFFICER MICHAEL PATRICK FOREST, M.S.M., C.D.
- COLONEL SEAN G. FRIDAY, M.S.M., C.D.
- MAJOR STACY ALLAN GRUBB, M.S.M., C.D.
- MAJOR JOSEPH ANTONIO MARCEL LOUIS HAMEL, M.S.M., C.D.
- COLONEL CHARLES MARK HAZLETON, O.M.M., M.S.M., C.D.
- COLONEL YANN JOHN HIDIROGLOU, M.S.M., C.D. (Retired)
- LIEUTENANT-COLONEL KERRY WILLIAM HORLOCK, M.S.M., C.D.
- WARRANT OFFICER KEVIN THOMAS JOHNSON, M.S.M., C.D.
- COLONEL VIHAR GOVIND JOSHI, M.S.M., C.D.
- CHIEF WARRANT OFFICER CHRISTOPHER AVARD KAYE, M.M.M., M.S.M., C.D.
- COLONEL PAUL KEDDY, M.S.M., C.D.
- CAPTAIN PETER PAUL KLEINSCHMIDT, M.S.M., C.D.
- COMMANDER KELLY BRIAN LARKIN, M.S.M., C.D.
- MAJOR JOHN ROBERT PRUDENT LATULIPPE, M.S.M., C.D.
- COLONEL THOMAS J. MCGRATH, M.S.M. of the United States Army
- COLONEL SCOTT ANDREW MCLEOD, M.S.M., C.D
- MAJOR-GENERAL CHRISTOPHER D. MILLER, M.S.M., of the United States Air Force
- COMMANDANT YVES MINJOLLET, M.S.M., of the French Armed Forces
- CORPORAL MARC L. S. MURRAY, M.S.M.
- VICE ADMIRAL ROBERT B. MURRETT, M.S.M., of the United States Navy
- COLONEL PHILIP M. L. NAPIER, M.S.M., of the British Army
- COMMANDER STEVEN PAGET, M.S.M., C.D.
- MAJOR ERIC JEAN PEREY, M.S.M., C.D.
- MASTER CORPORAL JACOB N. PETTEN, M.S.M.
- WARRANT OFFICER JASON GUY PICKARD, M.S.M., C.D.
- MAJOR CATHERINE ENID POTTS, M.S.M., C.D.
- CORPORAL JOHN CLIFTON WAYNE PRIOR, M.S.M.
- COLONEL JOSEPH PAUL JACQUES RICARD, M.S.M.
- COLONEL COLIN P. RICHARDSON, M.S.M.
- COLONEL JEAN-FRANÇOIS RIFFOU, M.S.M., C.D.
- MAJOR ROBERT TENNANT RITCHIE, M.S.M., C.D.
- CAPTAIN (N) BRENDAN RYAN, M.S.M., C.D.
- CORPORAL CAMERON M. SMITHERS, M.S.M.
- LIEUTENANT-COLONEL MARTHA-ANNE PAULE STOUFFER, M.S.M., C.D.
- CORPORAL RORY E. SWANSON, M.S.M.
- MAJOR-GENERAL DENNIS CHARLES TABBERNOR, C.M.M., M.S.M., C.D.
- CHIEF WARRANT OFFICER CHRISTOPHER ARNOLD WHITE, M.M.M., M.S.M., C.D.
- COMMANDER JOHN AUBREY WILLISTON, M.S.M., C.D.
- WARRANT OFFICER TERENCE CHARLES WOLANIUK, M.S.M., C.D.
- MAJOR MARK G. WUENNENBERG, M.S.M., C.D.
- WARRANT OFFICER RUSSELL KEITH ARSENAULT, M.S.M., C.D.
- MAJOR OREST BABIJ, M.S.M., C.D.
- LIEUTENANT-COLONEL ROGER RONALD BARRETT, M.S.M., C.D.
- LIEUTENANT-COLONEL JAMES FREDERICK CAMSELL, M.S.M., C.D.
- LIEUTENANT-COLONEL FRANCES CHILTON-MACKAY, O.M.M., M.S.M., C.D.
- COLONEL CHRISTOPHER JOHN COATES, M.S.M., C.D.
- MASTER WARRANT OFFICER KEVIN JOSEPH RALPH DONOVAN, M.S.M., C.D.
- WARRANT OFFICER RICHARD DUBÉ, M.S.M., C.D.
- MASTER WARRANT OFFICER LUC EMOND, M.S.M., C.D.
- CAPTAIN DAVID FEARON, M.S.M., C.D.
- MASTER WARRANT OFFICER DAVID EUGENE FISHER, M.S.M., C.D.
- COLONEL RICHARD JOSEPH DELPHIS GERVAIS, M.S.M., C.D.
- CHIEF WARRANT OFFICER ERNEST JOSEPH HALL, M.M.M., M.S.M., C.D.
- MASTER CORPORAL WILLIAM THOMAS HOGGARTH, M.S.M., C.D.
- BRIGADIER-GENERAL ALAN JOHN HOWARD, M.S.M., C.D.
- LIEUTENANT-COLONEL DANIEL S. HURLBUT, M.S.M. of the United States Army
- MASTER WARRANT OFFICER LEWIS DUTHIE JOSEPH LAVOIE, M.S.M., C.D.
- MAJOR ROBERT WALTER MCBRIDE, M.S.M., C.D.
- MASTER WARRANT OFFICER SHAWN ANTHONY MERCER, M.S.M., C.D.
- LIEUTENANT-COLONEL SCOTT MILLER, M.S.M. of the United States Air Force
- COLONEL THEODORE E. OSOWSKI, M.S.M. of the United States Air Force
- MASTER WARRANT OFFICER ERIC JOHN ROLFE, M.S.M., C.D.
- LIEUTENANT-COLONEL JOSEPH STEPHEN SHIPLEY, M.S.M., C.D.
- MAJOR DEAN DWAYNE TREMBLAY, M.S.M., C.D.
- MAJOR RUSSELL NEAL WASHBURN, M.S.M., C.D.
- MAJOR GEOFFREY ARTHUR ABTHORPE, M.S.M., C.D.
- MASTER CORPORAL JOSEPH LEONARD ARSENAULT, M.S.M., C.D.
- MAJOR JONATHAN CLAUDE YVON BOUCHARD, M.S.M., C.D.
- CAPTAIN JEFFREY MIDDLETON POWELL, M.S.M.
- MASTER CORPORAL JEFFREY GORDON SPENCE, M.S.M., C.D.
- COLONEL TONY BATTISTA, M.S.M., C.D.
- CORPORAL JOSEPH RUDOLF ÉRIC BEAUCLAIR, M.S.M., C.D.
- CAPTAIN CRAIG WAYNE DESJARDINS, M.B., M.S.M., C.D.
- CORPORAL EMELIE PILON, M.S.M.
- PETTY OFFICER 2ND CLASS BARBARA AGNES BENSON, M.S.M., C.D.
- MAJOR TIMOTHY CHARLES BYERS, M.S.M., C.D.
- LIEUTENANT-COLONEL SCOTT NORMAN CLANCY, M.S.M., C.D.
- CHIEF WARRANT OFFICER ROBERT DALY, M.S.M., C.D.
- CHIEF WARRANT OFFICER PATRICK JOSEPH EARLES, M.S.M., C.D.
- CHIEF PETTY OFFICER 1ST CLASS JOCELYN JOSEPH RENÉ FRÉCHETTE, M.S.M., C.D.
- COLONEL J. J. MARTIN GIRARD, M.S.M., C.D.
- COMMODORE RICHARD WESTON GREENWOOD, O.M.M., M.S.M., C.D.
- SERGEANT RENAY MARIE GROVES, M.S.M., C.D.
- MASTER WARRANT OFFICER JOHN WILLIAM HOOYER, M.S.M., C.D.
- LIEUTENANT-COLONEL JAMES ANDREW IRVINE, M.S.M., C.D.
- CHIEF WARRANT OFFICER MICHAEL RAYMOND LACHARITE, M.S.M., C.D.
- COLONEL JEAN-MARC LANTHIER, M.S.C., M.S.M., C.D.
- CAPTAIN TYLER LAVIGNE, M.S.M.
- CORPORAL DERICK R. LEWIS, M.S.M.
- MAJOR MARTIN ANDRE LIPCSEY, M.S.M., C.D.
- CAPTAIN STEVEN E. LUCE, M.S.M. of the United States Navy
- MAJOR JOSEPH GILBERT LÉON MCCAULEY, M.S.M., C.D.
- CAPTAIN(N) ARTHUR GERARD MCDONALD, M.S.M., C.D.
- COLONEL MICHAEL MCLEAN, O.M.M., M.S.M., C.D.
- CHIEF WARRANT OFFICER MARK HENRY MILLER, M.M.M., M.S.M., C.D.
- MASTER WARRANT OFFICER ROBERT JOSEPH MONTAGUE, M.M.M., M.S.M., C.D.
- MAJOR STEVEN JOHN VINCENT NOLAN, M.S.M., C.D.
- LIEUTENANT-COLONEL CHRISTOPHER KENNETH PENNY, M.S.M.
- CORPORAL CURTIS J. STEPHENS, M.S.M.
- LIEUTENANT-COLONEL DUART PAUL TOWNSEND, M.S.M., C.D.
- CAPTAIN(N) THOMAS CHARLES TULLOCH, M.S.M., C.D.
- COLONEL JEAN-MICHEL DÉSIRÉ VERNEY, M.S.M. of the French Army
- CAPTAIN CONNIE NOREEN WATSON, M.S.M., C.D.
- SERGEANT CHRISTOPHER STUART WHALEN, M.S.M., C.D.

== Mention in Dispatches ==
- Private Jeffrey Atlee
- Private David C. Banks
- Captain Robert E. Barker
- Captain Ross William Bonnell
- Warrant Officer Daniel William Bouchie, C.D.
- Corporal Christopher R. Busche
- Captain Christopher W. Carthew
- Corporal Erkin Cicekci
- Captain Jeffery J. Code
- Corporal Shaun David Copeland
- Captain Raymond Jean-Claude Corby
- Sergeant Steven Alan Corcoran, C.D.
- Lieutenant Aaron Edward Corey
- Captain Simon J. Cox
- Warrant Officer Robin John Crane, M.M.V., C.D.
- Corporal Sheldon R. G. Crawford
- Sergeant James Robert George Davidson, C.D.
- Corporal Jean-Guy Ross Dinelle
- Master Corporal Hugh R. Dixon
- Private Aaron A. Dodge
- Sergeant Wayne Bernard Dunphy, C.D.
- Sergeant Timothy Wayne Fletcher, C.D.
- Corporal Kevin J. Foley
- Private Phillip A. Frank
- Corporal Lucus John Fuller
- Corporal David S. Giles
- Corporal Dustin M. Girard
- Corporal Casey A. E. Gray
- Master Corporal Kelly A. Harding, C.D.
- Private Ryan E. Harding
- Warrant Officer Paul Justin Holwell, C.D.
- Private Bradley K. Johnston
- Warrant Officer Terry Thomas Jones, C.D.
- Corporal Carl B. A. Kriwez
- Private Cody R. Kuluski
- Master Corporal Joseph E. Leger
- Corporal Clayton D. MacLean
- Private Justin G. MacPherson
- Corporal Matthew A. McLean
- Corporal Lee Allan Miller
- Corporal Tyler Brian Myroniuk, M.M.V.
- Master Corporal Brent Simon Nolasco
- Corporal Vincent Jacques Peters
- Warrant Officer Jason Guy Pickard, M.S.M., C.D.
- Sergeant Matthew Timothy Pronk, C.D.
- Corporal Patrick J. R. A. Ranger
- Master Corporal Johnathon E. Scharf
- Private Andrew Brett Smallman
- Sergeant Paul Dean Sprenger, C.D.
- Sergeant Derek Ashley Thompson, C.D.
- Private Jason C. Toole
- Corporal Calvin T. Vickerman
- Lieutenant Daniel J. Vincent
- Warrant Officer Mike Eric Vollick, C.D.
- Master Corporal Kevin William Walker, C.D.
- Private Ryan K. Waring
- Corporal James Craig White
- Master Corporal Ricky L. Woods
- Captain Shawn Christopher Dumbreck
- Master Warrant Officer Rene F. Kiens, C.D.
- Corporal David A. MacDonald
- Corporal Sebastien Picard
- Private Ben L. Rasmussen
- Private Kiernan R. Underwood

== Commonwealth and Foreign Orders, Decorations and Medal awarded to Canadians ==
=== From Her Majesty The Queen in Right of the United Kingdom ===
==== Operation Service Medals ====
===== Operational Service Medal (Iraq) =====
- Major Murray Allen Carlson

===== Operational Service Medal (Afghanistan) with Clasp =====
- Captain Adam B. Battista

===== Operational Service Medal (Afghanistan) =====
- Master Corporal Corey Edwards
- Captain Jean-François Gauvin

=== From the President of Austria ===
==== Grand Decoration of Honour in Silver ====
- Dr. Franz A. J. Szabo

=== From His Majesty The King of the Belgians ===
==== Officer of the Order of the Crown ====
- Mr. Marcel Junius

=== From Her Majesty The Queen of Denmark ===
==== Order of the Dannebrog ====
- Mr. Jonas Lennart Albeck

=== From the President of Finland ===
==== Order of the White Rose, First Class ====
- Mr. Tenho Mikko Rautiainen

=== From the President of the French Republic ===
==== National Order of the Legion of Honour ====
===== Knight of the National Order of the Legion of Honour =====
- Mr. Okill Stuart

==== Order of Arts and Letters ====
===== Officer of the Order of Arts and Letters =====
- Mr. Marcel Fournier
- Mr. Hilliard Todd Goldfarb
- Mrs. Claire Martin
- Mr. John Porter

===== Knight of the Order of Arts and Letters =====
- Mr. Ronald Burnett
- Mrs. Marie Chouinard
- Mr. Paul-André Fortier
- Mr. George Laverock
- Mrs. Alice Munro
- Mrs. Line Ouellet
- Mr. William Thorsell

==== National Defence Medal ====
===== National Defence Medal, Gold Echelon with Clasp "Infantry" =====
- Commander Kewin Crowell
- Lieutenant-Colonel Jacques Pellan

=== From the President of Hungary ===
==== Knight's Cross of the Order of Merit of the Republic of Hungary (Civil Division) ====
- Professor Laszlo Kiss

=== From the President of Italy ===
==== Grand Officer of the Order of the Star of Solidarity ====
- Mr. Steven Muzzo

==== Knight of the Order of Merit ====
- Mr. Paolo Venerino Tamburello
- Mr. Elio Coppola
- Ms. Maddalena Palumbo Iannitti

==== Grand Officer of the Order of Merit ====
- Mr. Wilfrid Wilkinson

=== From His Majesty The Emperor of Japan ===
==== Order of the Rising Sun, Gold and Silver Rays ====
- Ms. Shizuko Kadoguchi
- Mr. Robert Koji Nimi
- Mr. Jonathan Takeo Yokoyama

=== From the Secretary General of the North Atlantic Treaty Organisation ===
==== NATO's Meritorious Service Medal ====
- Lieutenant-Colonel Peter Hauenstein
- Lieutenant-Colonel Jason Elliott King
- Corporal Eric Lund
- Lieutenant-General W. Angus Watt

=== From the President of Latvia ===
==== Cross of Recognition ====
- Mr. Christophe Alexandre

=== From the President of Poland ===
==== Order of Merit ====
===== Commander's Cross of the Order of Merit =====
- Mr. David Preston
- Lieutenant-General Andrew Brooke Leslie

===== Officer's Cross of the Order of Merit =====
- Mr. Don Rosenbloom
- Mr. Jerzy Barycki
- Mr. Jerzy Bibik
- Mr. Szydlowski Krzysztof Lubicz
- Mrs. Ewa Poninska-Konopacka
- Mr. Adam Kreutzer
- Mrs. Zofia Stohandel
- Mr. Boleslaw Fujarczuk
- Mr. John Szumlas
- Mrs. Bozena Khan

===== Knight's Cross of the Order of Merit =====
- Mrs. Graźyna Urszula Farmus
- Mrs. Anne McDougall
- Mr. Guillaume Siemienski (posthumously)
- Mrs. Teresa Bobrowska
- Mr. Jacek Niemirski
- Mrs. Malgorzta De-Riedel Burczycka
- Dr. Janina Stencel
- Mrs. Malgorzata Niemirska

===== Gold Cross of the Order of Merit =====
- Mr. Marek Przykorski

==== Order of Polonia Restituta ====
===== Commander's Cross of the Order of Polonia Restituta =====
- Mr. Aleksander Siwy

===== Officer's Cross of the Order of Polonia Restituta =====
- Mr. Mieczyslaw Lutczyk
- Mr. Marceli Ostrowski
- Mrs. Nelli Franciszka Turzanska-Szymborska
- Mr. Zbigniew Gondek

===== Knight's Cross of the Order of Polonia Restituta =====
- Mr. Henryk Lekusz
- Mr. Wladyslaw Lizon
- Mr. Ted (Tadeusz) Opitz
- Mr. Boleslaw Rutkowski
- Mr. Stanislaw Wozniak

==== Gold Cross of Merit ====
- Mrs. Sophia (Zofia) De Witt
- Mr. Lionel Jose Goffart
- Mrs. Mary Nieć
- Mrs. Zofia Sliwinska
- Sister Teresa Bosowska
- Mr. Ireneusz Kotecki

==== Silver Cross of Merit ====
- Mr. Marian Jaworski
- Mrs. Teresa Maria Klimuszko
- Mr. Tad Lojko
- Mrs. Wieslawa Potocka
- Mrs. Janina Gojska
- Mrs. Beata Malgorzata Grotkowska

==== Bronze Cross of Merit ====
- Mr. Henry Patterson
- Mr. Roman Wodejko
- Mr. Tomasz Wroblewski
- Mr. Jerzy Ziolkowski

==== (Erratum) ====
- The notice published on page 1668 of the June 26, 2010, issue of the Canada Gazette, Part I, is hereby amended as follows:

===== Officer's Cross of the Order of Polonia Restituta =====
- Mr. Szydlowski Krzysztof Lubicz
- Mrs. Ewa Poninska-Konopacka
- Mr. Adam Kreutzer
- Mrs. Zofia Stohandel

===== Knights Cross of the Order of Merit =====
- Mr. Ted (Tadeusz) Opitz
- Mr. Boleslaw Rutkowski

===== Gold Cross of the Order of Merit =====
- Mr. Jerzy Bibik

=== From the President of Portugal ===
==== Commander's Order of Merit ====
- Mr. Charles De Sousa

=== From the President of the United States of America ===
==== Legion of Merit ====
===== Officer of the Legion of Merit =====
- Major-General Peter J. Devlin
- Lieutenant-General J. O. Michel Maisonneuve

==== Bronze Star Medal ====
- Major Marie M. Ryan-Roberts

==== Meritorious Service Medal ====
- Chief Warrant Officer Jefferson P. Barry
- Major Barry A. Costiff
- Captain Andrew S. Dalziel
- Lieutenant-Colonel Normand Dionne
- Lieutenant-Colonel Rejean Duchesneau
- Lieutenant-Colonel John L. Frappier
- Commander Darren C. Hawco
- Colonel Ian Hope
- Major Douglas O'Neill
- Major Robert J. Paxton
- Colonel Barry Marshall Southern

==== Air Medal — first Oak Leaf Cluster ====
- Captain Pierre A. Grignon

==== Air Medal ====
- Captain Pierre A. Grignon
- Captain Steve G. Lamarche
