= Admiral Donaldson =

Admiral Donaldson may refer to:

- Bruce Donaldson (Canadian admiral) (fl. 1970s–2010s), Royal Canadian Navy vice admiral
- Edward Donaldson (1816–1889), U.S. Navy rear admiral
- Leonard Andrew Boyd Donaldson (1875–1956), British Royal Navy admiral
