= Roméo Savoie =

Canadian postwar and contemporary artist (1928–2023)

Roméo Savoie CM
- Born: March 9, 1928; Moncton, New Brunswick, Canada
- Died: October 14, 2023 (aged 95); Moncton, New Brunswick, Canada
- Education: Université du Québec à Montréal
- Known for: Painter
- Parent: Calixte Savoie (father)
- Awards: Member of the Order of Canada (2009); Lieutenant Governor's Award for High Achievement in Visual Arts (2009); Honorary Doctorate in Visual Arts from the Université de Moncton (1999); Strathbutler Award (1998); Miller Brittain Award (1994); Éloize Artist of the Year (1988)

Roméo Savoie CM (March 9, 1928 – October 14, 2023) was a Canadian postwar and contemporary artist. One of the first abstract painters in Eastern Canada, the artist's body of work includes more than 4,000 paintings, 50 buildings, six poetry anthologies, and one novel.

Savoie, who was appointed a Member of the Order of Canada (CM) in the 2010 Canadian honours for his contributions to painting, architecture, and literature, participated in over thirty solo exhibits and as many group ones. His works are a part of major public and private collections in Canada and France.

== Early life ==
Roméo Savoie was born in Moncton, New-Brunswick, on March 9, 1928. His father, Calixte Savoie, was a Canadian senator (1955-1970), a businessman, school principal, and teacher. In 1950, Savoie earned his bachelor’s degree in arts from the Collège Saint-Joseph in Memramcook, New Brunswick, and went on to study architecture. After earning his bachelor's degree in architecture from the École des Beaux-Arts in Montreal in 1956, he worked until 1970 with several architectural firms in Montreal, Quebec and throughout New Brunswick, eventually opening his own firm. Over the 1956-1970 period, he was responsible for the construction of around fifty buildings.

In 1964, Roméo Savoie took a year-long trip to Europe and settled in Carvajal, Spain for three months to practice painting at the encouragement of a French painter. In 1970, Savoie returned to Europe and began a two-year stay in Aix-en-Provence, France, where he dedicated himself entirely to painting. From that period on, his architecture career faded into the background and his passion for painting took over.

== Career ==
Roméo Savoie obtained a Master of Fine Arts from the Université du Québec à Montréal in 1988 and exhibited his work in more than 30 solo shows, including a major retrospective at the Beaverbrook Art Gallery in 2006. Beginning in 1998, the artist had a constant stream of exhibitions in Canada, the Caribbean, Brussels, and Paris.

In 1997, Savoie created a mural painting in situ at the Galerie d’Art de l’Université de Moncton on the theme of Evangeline, marking the 150th anniversary of the publication of American poet Henry Wadsworth Longfellow’s work depicting the Great Acadian Expulsion of 1755. He coordinated, designed and co-directed, with Lieutenant Governor Herménégilde Chiasson, the exhibition Évangéline, Mythe ou Réalité at the Festival International des Arts Contemporains in La Rochelle, France.

Savoie was a passionate supporter of Acadian culture and contemporary art and helped establish art organizations and galleries including Galerie Sans Nom and Galerie 12, both located in Moncton’s Aberdeen Cultural Centre of which he was a founding member. Savoie curated many exhibitions, including an anniversary collection gathered by the Caisses Populaires Acadiennes and a retrospective exhibition held in Bouctouche as part of the 1994 Acadian World Congress—the largest visual arts show ever presented in Acadie, with over 230 works.

== Death ==
Roméo Savoie died on October 14, 2023, at the age of 95.

== Collections ==
- Canada Council Art Bank
- New Brunswick Art Bank
- Musée national des beaux-arts du Québec
- Canadian Cultural Centre in Paris
- SNC-Lavalin, in Montreal

== Education ==
- Bachelor of Arts, Collège Saint-Joseph in Memramcook (1950)
- Bachelor of Architecture, École des Beaux-Arts in Montreal (1956)
- Master of Fine Arts, Université du Québec à Montréal (1988)
- Honorary Doctorate of Visual Arts, Université de Moncton (1999)

== Awards ==
- Order of Merit of Université de Moncton Alumni, 2013.
- Member of the Order of Canada, 2010
- Lieutenant Governor's Award for High Achievement in Visual Arts, 2009
- Strathbutler Award, 1998
- Miller Brittain Award, 1994
- Éloize Artist of the Year, 1988

== Bibliography ==
=== Poetry ===
Trajets dispersés (1989)

L'eau brisée (1982)

Dans l'ombre des images (1991)

Une lointaine Irlande (2001)

=== Fiction ===
Le mensonge caméléon (2010)
