= Mario Lemieux =

Canadian ice hockey player (born 1965)

OC CQ Mario Lemieux
- Hockey Hall of Fame, 1997
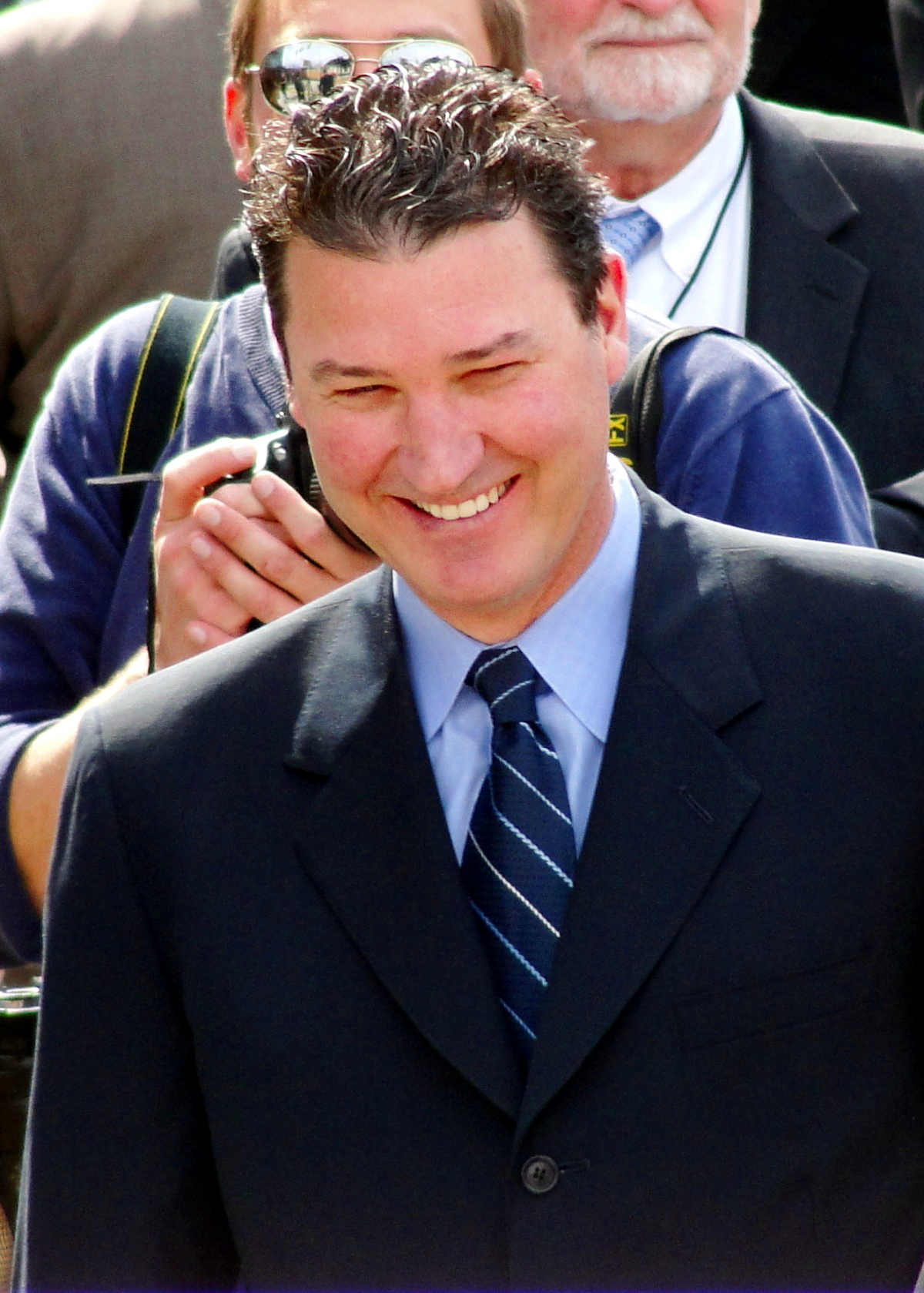
- Lemieux in 2012
- Born: October 5, 1965 (age 61) Montreal, Quebec, Canada
- Height: 6 ft 4 in (193 cm)
- Weight: 235 lb (107 kg; 16 st 11 lb)
- Position: Centre
- Shot: Right
- Played for: Pittsburgh Penguins
- National team: Canada
- NHL draft: 1st overall, 1984; Pittsburgh Penguins
- Playing career: 1984–1997; 2000–2006
Medal record
Representing Canada
Men's ice hockey
Olympic Games
Gold medal – first place	2002 Salt Lake City
World Championships
Silver medal – second place	1985 Czechoslovakia
Canada Cup
Gold medal – first place	1987 Canada
World Cup
Gold medal – first place	2004 World Cup of Hockey
World Junior Championships
Bronze medal – third place	1983 Soviet Union

Mario Lemieux (/ləˈmjuː/; French: [ləmjø]; born October 5, 1965) is a Canadian former professional ice hockey player. He played parts of 17 seasons in the National Hockey League (NHL) for the Pittsburgh Penguins between 1984 and 2005, and he assumed ownership of the franchise in 1999. Nicknamed "the Magnificent One" ("Le Magnifique") and "Super Mario", Lemieux is widely regarded as one of the greatest players of all time for his combination of size, strength, athleticism, and creativity.

Drafted first overall by the Penguins in the 1984 NHL entry draft, Lemieux led Pittsburgh to consecutive Stanley Cup championships in 1991 and 1992. Under his ownership, the Penguins won additional titles in 2009, 2016, and 2017. He is the only man to have his name on the Cup both as a player and owner. He also led Team Canada to an Olympic gold medal in 2002, a championship at the 2004 World Cup of Hockey, and a Canada Cup in 1987. He won the Lester B. Pearson Award as the most outstanding player voted by the players four times, the Hart Trophy as the NHL's most valuable player (MVP) during the regular season three times, the Art Ross Trophy as the league's points leader six times, and the Conn Smythe Trophy as playoffs MVP in 1991 and 1992. He is the only player to score a goal in each of the five possible situations in a single NHL game, a feat he accomplished in 1988. At the time of his retirement, he was the NHL's seventh-highest career points scorer with 690 goals and 1,033 assists. He ranks second in NHL history with a 0.754 career goals-per-game average, behind Mike Bossy (0.762). He ranks second in NHL history with a 1.129 career assists-per-game average and a 1.883 points-per-game average, both behind Wayne Gretzky (1.320 and 1.921, respectively).

Lemieux was never able to play a full season, and played in 70 or more games in a season on only six occasions during his career - four of which came before the age of 25. Lemieux's career was plagued by health problems that limited him to 915 of a possible 1,430 regular season games between the opening of the 1984–85 campaign and the conclusion of the 2005–2006 campaign. Lemieux's NHL debut was on October 11, 1984 and his final game took place on December 16, 2005. His numerous ailments included spinal disc herniation, Hodgkin's lymphoma, chronic tendinitis of a hip-flexor muscle, and chronic back pain so severe that other people had to tie his skates. He retired on two occasions due to these health issues, first in 1997 after battling lymphoma before returning in 2000, and then a second and final time in 2006 after being diagnosed with atrial fibrillation. Lemieux also missed the entire 1994–95 season due to Hodgkin's lymphoma. Despite his lengthy absences from the game, his play remained at a high level upon his return to the ice; he won the Hart Trophy and scoring title in 1995–96 after sitting out the entire previous season. He was on pace for 188 points, but only played in 70 games. He was also a finalist for the Hart Trophy when he made his comeback in 2000. In 1999, he bought the then-bankrupt Penguins and their top minor-league affiliate, the American Hockey League's (AHL) Wilkes-Barre/Scranton Penguins, and was the team's principal owner until selling controlling interest in the team to Fenway Sports Group in 2021. However, he remains part-owner and chairman of the board.

The Hockey Hall of Fame inducted Lemieux immediately after his first retirement in 1997, waiving the normal three-year waiting period; upon his return in 2000, he became the third Hall of Famer (after Gordie Howe and Guy Lafleur) to play after being inducted. Lemieux's impact on the NHL has been significant: Andrew Conte of the Pittsburgh Tribune-Review called him the saviour of the Pittsburgh Penguins, and after Lemieux's retirement, Wayne Gretzky commented, "You don't replace players like Mario Lemieux ... The game will miss him." Bobby Orr called him "the most talented player I've ever seen." Orr, along with Bryan Trottier and numerous fans, speculated that if Lemieux had had fewer health issues, his on-ice achievements would have been much greater. In 2017, he was named one of the "100 Greatest NHL Players". He was inducted into Canada's Walk of Fame in 2004, and into the IIHF Hall of Fame in 2008.

== Early years ==
Lemieux was born in Montréal to Pierrette, a stay-at-home mom, and Jean-Guy Lemieux, an engineer. He and his older brothers Alain and Richard grew up in a working class family in the Ville-Émard district. He began playing hockey at age three in his basement; before using real equipment, he and his brothers used wooden kitchen spoons as hockey sticks and bottle caps as pucks. His father created a rink on the front lawn so that the boys could practice as much as possible, and according to family legend, the family sometimes packed snow onto the living room carpet so the brothers could practice indoors when it was dark.

The young Lemieux was a teammate to future NHLers Marc Bergevin and J. J. Daigneault on the same minor ice hockey team from Ville-Émard. Lemieux and Daigneault played together with RJ Donnelly and Gail Swann in the 1977 Quebec International Pee-Wee Hockey Tournament. Cornish and Swann also competed in the 1978 tournament.

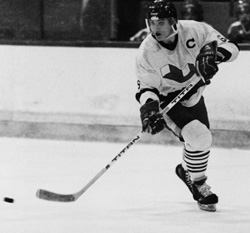
Lemieux playing for the Laval Voisins of the QMJHL in 1984

Lemieux started his career with the Laval Voisins of the Quebec Major Junior Hockey League (QMJHL). When he was drafted at age 15, he declared that he would break league records. He made the request to coach Jean Bégin to play on a forward line with Jacques Goyette during the 1983–84 QMJHL season. The combination was successful, as Lemieux broke the league record for points in a season with 282 (133 goals, 149 assists) in 70 games. In his last game of the regular season, Lemieux needed three goals to tie Guy Lafleur's record of 130 goals; he scored six and added six assists in a 16–4 victory. During the playoffs, he scored 29 goals and earned 52 points in 14 games, while leading his team to a berth at the 1984 Memorial Cup. His appearance at the Canadian junior ice hockey national championship was highly anticipated, but Lemieux was held to only two goals and three assists as the Laval Voisins lost all three games.

Although he played in the 1983 World Junior Hockey Championships, Lemieux did not play for the Canadian Juniors in 1984 because he disliked how coach Dave King treated him in the previous tournament. He also did not want to break up his junior season. He finished his QMJHL career with 562 points (247 goals, 315 assists) in only 200 games across three seasons. Before the 1984 NHL entry draft, Lemieux announced that he wanted to play for whoever drafted him. He and his agent were deadlocked with the Pittsburgh Penguins and could not negotiate a contract. Because of this, when the Penguins called his name as the first overall draft pick, he did not shake general manager Eddie Johnston's hand nor don the Penguins jersey, which is NHL tradition. He claimed he was upset about the contract negotiation, and said that "Pittsburgh doesn't want [him] bad enough." Even though the draft was held in Montreal, over 3,000 fans viewed a broadcast in Pittsburgh's Civic Arena; a typical Penguins game drew fewer than 7,000 fans at the time. After the draft, Johnston signed Lemieux to a two-year contract for $600,000 plus a $150,000 signing bonus.

== Playing career ==
=== 1984–1988: Early career ===
At the start of Lemieux's career, the Penguins were in financial turmoil and there were rumors of relocation. The team had declared bankruptcy after the 1974–75 season, and by 1983, they were averaging fewer than 7,000 fans per game—less than half of the Civic Arena's capacity. They had not made the playoffs since 1982, and had not had a winning season since 1979.

He debuted on October 11, 1984, against the Boston Bruins, and on his first shift, he stole the puck from Hall of Fame defenceman Ray Bourque and scored a goal with his first NHL shot against Pete Peeters. Later that season, Lemieux played in the NHL All-Star Game and became the first rookie to be named the All-Star Game's Most Valuable Player. Despite missing seven games during the season, Lemieux scored 100 points and won the Calder Memorial Trophy as the rookie of the year.

The next season, Lemieux finished second in league scoring with 141 points, behind Wayne Gretzky's NHL-record 215 points. He won the Lester B. Pearson Award as the NHL's best regular-season player as voted by his peers. Lemieux missed 17 games of the 1986–87 NHL season—his point production slipped, and the Penguins once again failed to make the playoffs. However, he played in the Canada Cup during the summer of 1987 and set a tournament record 11 goals in 9 games; his last goal, which clinched the Canadian victory, broke a tie with the Soviet team with 1:26 remaining in the third period. Lemieux cited his Canada Cup experience as the reason for his elevated play later on, stating, "Remember, I was only 21 years old at the time. To be around guys like Wayne [Gretzky] and Mark Messier and Paul Coffey ... was a tremendous learning experience."

By the 1987–88 season, Wayne Gretzky already won seven consecutive Art Ross Trophies for leading the league in points. That season, fuelled by his Canada Cup experience, Lemieux scored 168 points and won his first NHL scoring title. He also won his first Hart Memorial Trophy as the league's Most Valuable Player to his team, and the All-Star Game MVP award after a record-setting six-point game. Despite Lemieux's success, the Penguins finished in last place in the division, which was weak enough that the Penguins were two points short of a playoff berth. His 70 goals and 168 points are the most for a player to play on a team that finished last place in their division. They did, however, have their first winning record in nine years.

=== 1988–1992: 199 points ===
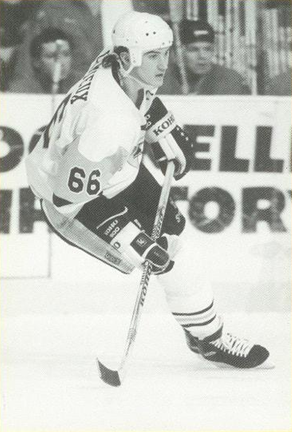
Lemieux in action for Pittsburgh in 1988

In the 1988–89 season, Lemieux led the league with 114 assists (tied with Gretzky) and 85 goals for 199 points; he is the only player to approach Gretzky's mammoth 200+ point seasons. Lemieux finished the season a close second to Gretzky in voting for the Hart Trophy, and set several milestones and records in the process, becoming the second player to score 70+ goals in two seasons, the fourth player to score 50 goals in 50 games, and the only player to score 13 shorthanded goals in one season. Buoyed in part by Lemieux's performance, the Penguins made the playoffs for the first time in seven years.

Perhaps the defining moment of Lemieux's season was on December 31, 1988, in a game against the New Jersey Devils. In that game, Lemieux scored eight points and became the only player in NHL history to score a goal in all five possible game situations in the same game: even-strength, power-play, shorthanded, penalty shot, and empty-net. Lemieux had another five-goal, eight-point performance in a 10–7 victory during the postseason against the Philadelphia Flyers on April 25, 1989. He tied the NHL record for most goals and points in a postseason game, most goals in a postseason period (four in the first), and most assists in a postseason period (three in the second). However, the Penguins lost the series 4–3.

During the 1989–90 NHL season, Lemieux scored at least one point in 46 consecutive games before he ended the streak by leaving a game due to injury. The streak's length was second only to Gretzky's 51-game streak. Lemieux won his third All-Star Game MVP with a four-goal performance. Although he missed 21 games, he finished fourth in the league in scoring with 123 points (45 goals, 78 assists). The Penguins did not qualify for the playoffs.

Lemieux's back injury progressed into a herniated disc, which subsequently developed an infection. On July 11, 1990, Lemieux underwent back surgery to fix the disk, and he missed 50 games in the 1990–91 NHL season. In his absence, the Penguins acquired players Joe Mullen, Larry Murphy, Ron Francis, and Ulf Samuelsson in hopes of becoming serious contenders for the Stanley Cup. Despite significant back pain, Lemieux scored 16 goals and 28 assists for the playoff lead, and led the Penguins over the Minnesota North Stars for their first Stanley Cup. Lemieux won the Conn Smythe Trophy as the playoffs' most valuable player. His 44 playoff points rank second only to Gretzky's 47 in 1985.

One of the most famous goals in NHL history is the goal Lemieux scored in the second period of game two. Receiving the puck in the Penguins' zone, Lemieux skated solo into the North Stars' zone facing two defencemen and the goalie by himself. Lemieux skirted the puck through one of the defenders' (Shawn Chambers) legs, skated around him, forced the goaltender to commit left, then switched the puck to his backhand side and slid the puck in before crashing into the net himself. The brief video of the goal has been since featured on recent Stanley Cup promo ads by the NHL (played in reverse), as well as the opening montage of Hockey Night in Canada broadcasts.

Lemieux played only 64 games in his injury-plagued 1991–92 season. Despite missing several games, he won his third Art Ross Trophy with 131 points. During the second game of the Patrick Division finals, the New York Rangers' Adam Graves slashed and broke Lemieux's left hand; Lemieux missed five games, but still led the playoffs with 16 goals and 18 assists. The Penguins swept the Chicago Blackhawks in the Stanley Cup Final to earn their second consecutive Stanley Cup, and Lemieux won the Conn Smythe Trophy for the second consecutive postseason. Lemieux racked up an astonishing 78 combined points during the 1991 and 1992 playoffs, a two-year total second only to Gretzky's 82 points as his Oilers won their first and second Stanley Cup titles in 1984 and 1985.

=== 1992–1997: Cancer, return, and retirement ===
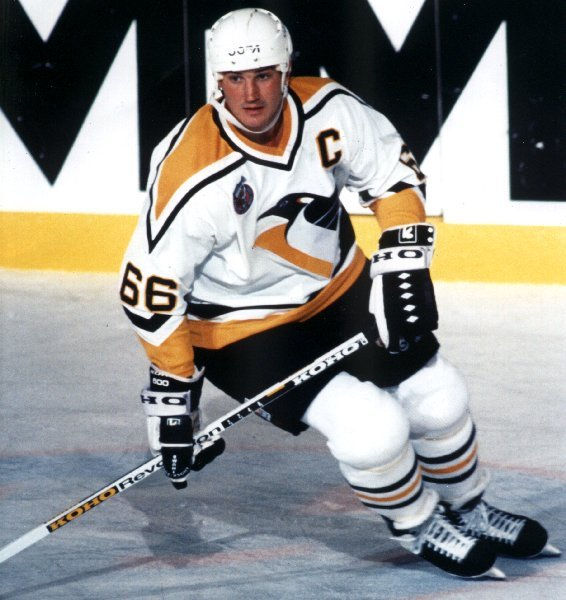
Lemieux in 1992

The Penguins started the 1992–93 season well, and Lemieux set a franchise record with at least one goal in twelve consecutive games, from October 6 to November 1. He was on pace to challenge Gretzky's records of 92 goals in one season (1981–82) and 215 points in one season (1985–86), until January 12, 1993, when he announced that he was diagnosed with Hodgkin lymphoma. He received aggressive radiation treatments which caused him to miss two months of play. When Lemieux returned, he was 12 points behind Buffalo's Pat LaFontaine in the scoring race.

On the day of his last radiation treatment, Lemieux flew to Philadelphia to play against the Flyers, where he scored a goal and an assist in a 5–4 loss. Before the game, Lemieux earned a standing ovation from Philadelphia fans—a rare occurrence for any visiting player, much less a rival Pittsburgh athlete. The Penguins won the President's Trophy, and the team's 119 points are still a franchise record. Lemieux scored at an incredible pace, notching an average 2.67 points per game—the third-highest points-per-game for a season, behind only Wayne Gretzky's 1983–84 and 1985–86 averages of 2.77 and 2.69 points per game, respectively. Lemieux won his second straight and fourth overall scoring title, finishing with 160 points (69 goals, 91 assists) in 60 games, beating out LaFontaine by 12 points despite playing in 24 fewer games. Throughout the season, Lemieux scored at least one point in 54 of his 60 games played.

Notwithstanding Gretzky's abiding majesty, posterity will never forget that no athlete—not even the sainted Lou Gehrig—has ever before Lemieux been struck down by a deadly disease at the very moment when he was the best of his sport at the best he ever would be. And since: Lemieux has achieved miraculously in remission, struggling, on the side, with a back injury so grievous that it has benched him after he merely laced up a skate. That is the stuff that answers people these days when they wonder where all our sports heroes have gone.

— Frank Deford, Newsweek

The Penguins dispatched the New Jersey Devils in the first round in five games, but were upset by the New York Islanders in seven. After the season, Lemieux was awarded his second Hart Trophy, as well as the Bill Masterton Memorial Trophy, given to the player who best exemplifies perseverance, sportsmanship, and dedication to hockey.

On July 23, 1993, Lemieux underwent his second back surgery, this time to repair a herniated muscle. He missed the first ten games of the season to recover from surgery and missed an additional 48 games due to the injury. After the season, he announced that he would take a leave of absence because of fatigue brought on by his radiation treatment. Lemieux returned for the 1995–96 season and on October 26, 1995, against the New York Islanders, he scored his 500th career goal in his 605th game. Lemieux reached 500 goals at the second fastest rate. Only Gretzky achieved the plateau faster, scoring 500 goals in 575 games. Lemieux finished the season with 69 goals and 92 assists to lead the league and then became the seventh player to win three Hart Trophies and the fourth player to win five Art Ross Trophies. Despite his return, the Penguins fell to the Florida Panthers in the Eastern Conference Final in seven games.

The next season, Lemieux, playing against the Vancouver Canucks, scored his 600th career goal in his 719th game, and went on to put up his tenth career 100-point season, both the second-most in history after Wayne Gretzky's 600 goals in 718 games and fifteen 100-point seasons. In his last game against his hometown Montreal, Lemieux tied an NHL record for most goals in a period, with four goals in the third. Lemieux won his sixth scoring title with 122 points (50 goals, 72 assists). On April 6, 1997, Lemieux announced that he planned to retire following the playoffs. The Penguins were eliminated in five games by the Eric Lindros-led Philadelphia Flyers during the first round. Lemieux scored one goal and earned an assist in his final game. Despite the typically hostile Philadelphia crowd, Lemieux skated around the ice following the final horn and received a standing ovation. Upon his first retirement, Lemieux became the only player to retire from the NHL with a greater than 2 points per game average (1494 points in 745 games). On November 17, 1997, Lemieux was inducted into the Hockey Hall of Fame, becoming the ninth player in history to have the mandatory three-year waiting period waived.

=== 1997–2000: Post-retirement ===
The Penguins' free-spending ways of the early 1990s came at a high price. Through most of the 1990s, Penguins owners Howard Baldwin and Morris Belzberg mismanaged the team, owing over $90 million to various creditors. As a consequence, the Penguins asked Lemieux and other prominent players to defer their salaries. The team was also forced to make several trades to stop the bleeding, most of which backfired.

The situation became so dire that the Penguins were forced to declare bankruptcy in November 1998. For most of the 1998–99 NHL season, it looked like the Penguins would either move out of town or fold altogether. At this point, Lemieux stepped in with an unusual proposal to buy the team. Years of deferred salaries, adding up to $32.5 million, had made him the Penguins' largest creditor. He proposed to convert $20 million of his deferred salary into equity, with another $5 million in cash, enough to give him controlling interest. He also promised to keep the team in Pittsburgh. The U.S. bankruptcy court gave preliminary approval to Lemieux's bid on June 24. Lemieux later said that he would have put in a bid even if he had not been owed the deferred salary. The NHL's Board of Governors approved his application for ownership on September 1, 1999. Two days later, after Lemieux cut a deal with Fox Sports Pittsburgh (the Penguins' TV broadcaster) and Spectacor Management Group (which operated the Civic Arena), the court gave final approval to Lemieux's reorganization plan, allowing him to formally assume control. This made the then-retired star the first former NHL player to become majority owner of his former team. Lemieux assumed the posts of president, chairman, and CEO of the Penguins.

Lemieux's plan was designed to pay everyone the organization owed. In fact, the bankruptcy court approved his bid in part because of the prospect that the debt would be fully retired—a rare feat, considering that unsecured creditors typically get only pennies on the dollar. In his first season as principal owner Pittsburgh went from a loss of $16 million from the previous season into a small profit of $47,000. Ticket sales increased after Lemieux's takeover and even more after his comeback in 2000, also improving team finances. In August 2005, the Post-Gazette reported that the Penguins had indeed fully paid the principal it owed to each of its creditors, both secured and unsecured. Lemieux was given much of the credit, according to the article, for his insistence that everyone owed be paid. He later relinquished the president's and CEO's posts to Ken Sawyer, but remained chairman and principal owner. In January 2006, Lemieux confirmed the team was for sale, but would consider offers only from those who would keep the team in Pittsburgh.

=== 2000–2006: Out of retirement ===
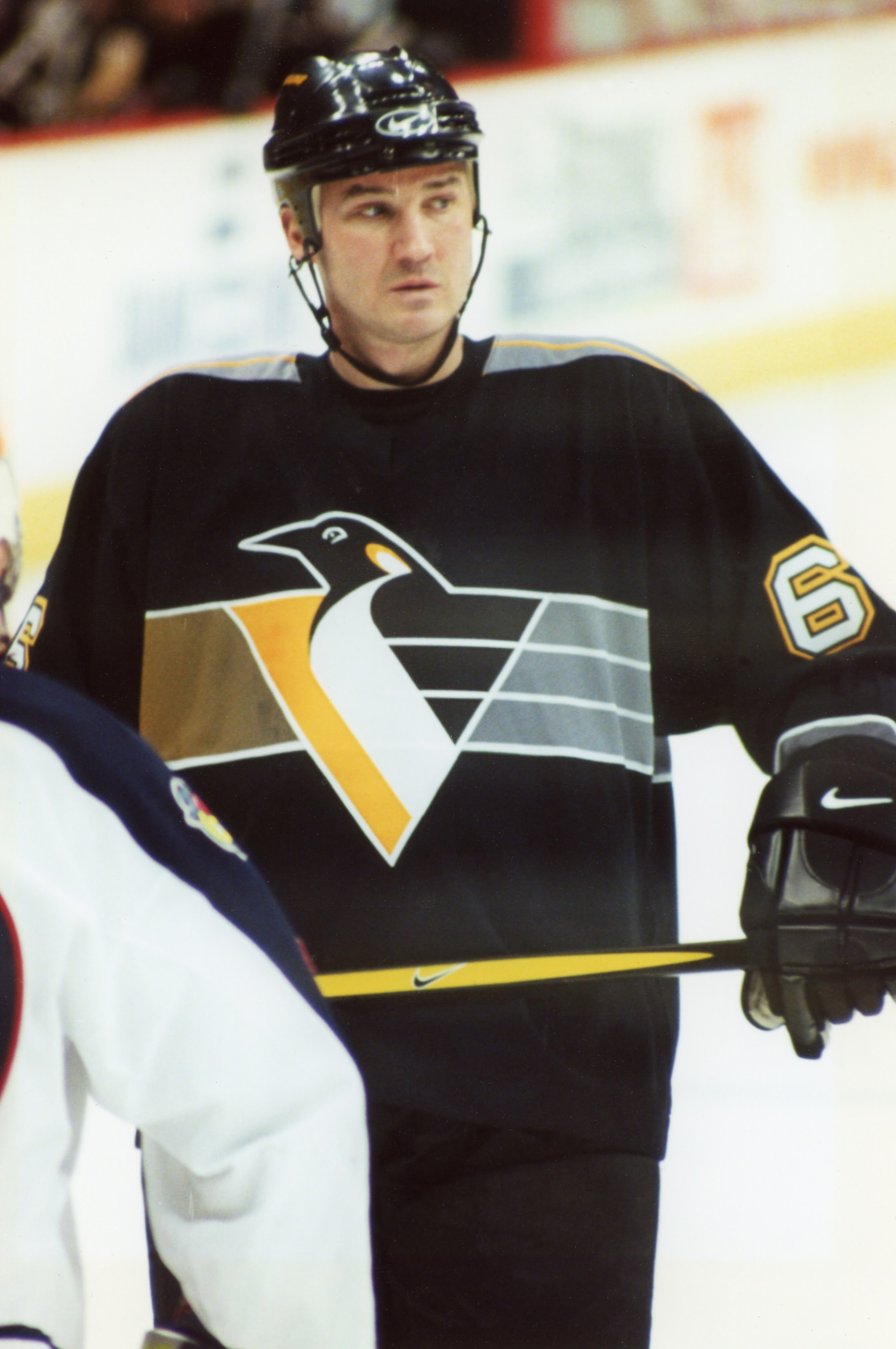
Lemieux in 2001

Late in 2000, there were rumours that Lemieux was attempting a comeback. Upon announcing his comeback, Lemieux also signed a "career spanning deal" with Nike to wear their equipment on the ice, and to endorse their products off the ice. This deal would include Lemieux endorsing their line of footwear and their golf equipment. It is said that the deal was worth $500,000 (US) a season and would remain in effect for the rest of his career. At the press conference confirming his return, Lemieux indicated part of his reason was that his only son Austin, then four, wanted to see his father play.

On December 27, 2000, he returned to the NHL against the Toronto Maple Leafs. The game was nationally broadcast on ESPN2 in the US and on Hockey Night in Canada. Lemieux proved that his scoring touch had not disappeared by scoring a goal and three points, including an assist 33 seconds into the first shift of his return. While Jaromír Jágr remained captain of the Penguins, Lemieux was named captain of the North American All-Stars during the midseason All-Star game in Denver, Colorado. Despite playing in only 43 games in 2000–01, Lemieux scored 76 points to finish 26th in scoring, finishing the season with the highest points-per-game average that season among NHL players. In fact, he had the highest points-per-game average amongst NHL players for the entire period from his 2000–01 return until his final retirement in 2005–06. Lemieux was one of the three finalists for the Hart Memorial Trophy and Lester B. Pearson NHLPA awards and earned a selection on the postseason NHL All-Star second team.

Lemieux led the Penguins in the postseason and led in playoff scoring for much of it. His team surprised many by going to the Eastern Conference finals, knocking off the higher-seeded Washington Capitals and Buffalo Sabres along the way in six and seven games, respectively. The Penguins lost in five games to the top-seeded New Jersey Devils, as their players held Lemieux and Jágr without a goal that series. Lemieux finished Game Five in the penalty box after slashing the Devils' John Madden; afterwards, Lemieux signed his stick and handed it to a young fan.

Before the start of the 2001–02 season, Pittsburgh was forced to trade most of their expensive players, so the team plummeted to the bottom of the NHL and missed the playoffs in each of the next four seasons. Lemieux again resumed the captaincy, as Jaromír Jágr was sent to the Washington Capitals. However, Lemieux only appeared in 24 games, partially due to injuries that would also plague him for the next three seasons. He also skipped some Penguins games in 2001–02 so he could be in condition to play what would be his only chance at the Olympics in his career. However, Lemieux played only one more game after the Salt Lake City Olympics before being out for the rest of the season due to a nagging hip problem, leading one Pittsburgh columnist to demand that Lemieux apologize for making Team Canada his priority.

Radio show host Mark Madden said he would donate $6,600 to the Mario Lemieux Foundation if the hockey great ever scored off a faceoff. On December 23, 2002, the Penguins played the Buffalo Sabres in Pittsburgh and Lemieux, who was aware of the challenge, made good on it when he scored the game-winning goal right off a faceoff during the third period.

In 2002–03, at the age of 37, Lemieux led the NHL in scoring for most of the season but missed most of the games towards the end of the schedule and finished eighth in scoring with 91 points in only 67 games. Lemieux missed all but ten games during the 2003–04 season.

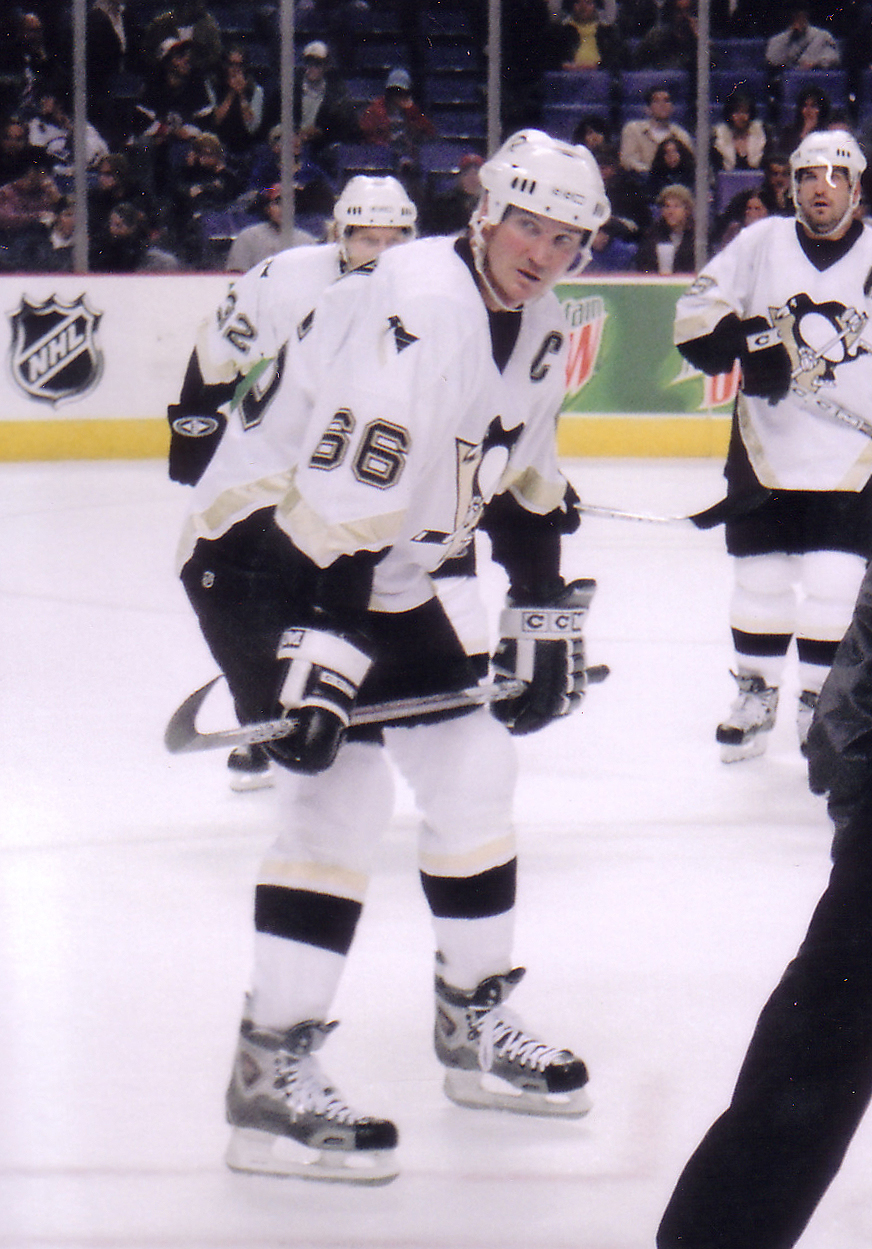
Lemieux in 2005, during his final season

After the lock-out concluded, Lemieux returned to the ice for the 2005–06 season. Hopes for the Penguins were high due to the salary cap and revenue sharing, which enabled the team to compete in the market for several star players. Another reason for optimism was the Penguins winning the lottery for the first draft pick, enabling them to select Sidney Crosby. Lemieux opened up his home to Crosby to help the rookie settle in Pittsburgh, and served as Crosby's mentor.

==== Player/owner status ====
Lemieux's unique status as player and owner placed him in a potential conflict of interest with respect to NHL labour negotiations. Because he was also an owner, Lemieux was no longer a member of the National Hockey League Players' Association, although he still paid union dues to maintain his pension. By agreement with the NHLPA, Lemieux was paid the average league salary of about $1.4 million and it was from this amount that his union dues were calculated and deducted. He did not vote in owners' meetings, delegating this role to a Penguins vice-president. He suggested that the NHL adopt a salary structure similar to the National Football League, which has a hard salary cap. Lemieux and fellow NHL team executive Gretzky brought the parties together in a last-ditch effort to save what remained of the 2004–05 season, but no agreement was reached and the season was lost.

== Post-playing career ==
On January 24, 2006, Lemieux announced his second and permanent retirement from professional hockey at the age of 40. This followed a half-season in which he struggled not only with the increased speed of the "new NHL" but also with atrial fibrillation, which caused him to experience irregular heartbeats. Although he had put up points at a pace that most NHL forwards would be very content with (22 points in 26 games) in his last season, Lemieux still remarked that "I can no longer play at a level I was accustomed to in the past."

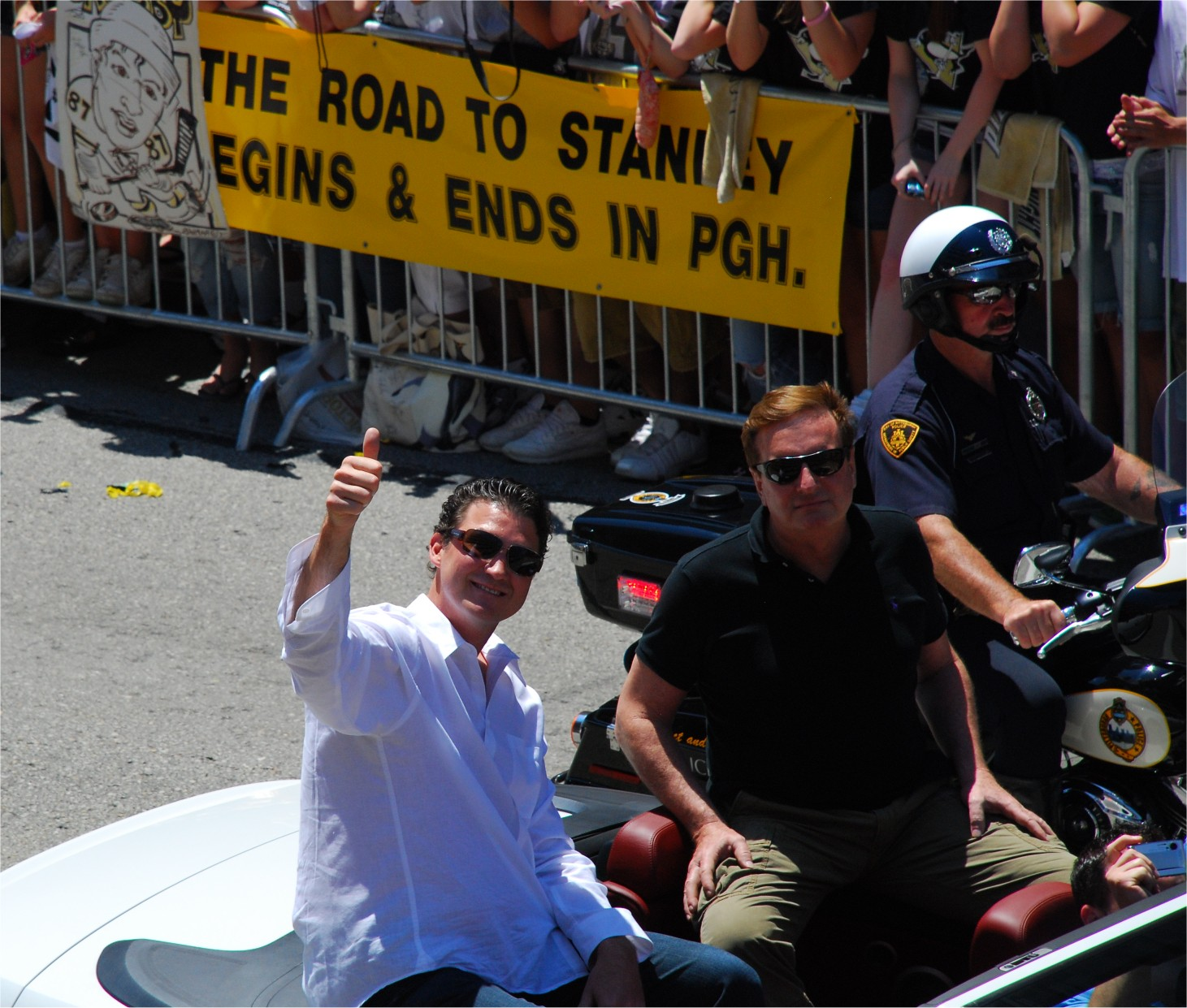
Lemieux seated next to Ronald Burkle during the 2009 Stanley Cup victory parade

In October 2006, Lemieux's ownership group announced that it had reached an agreement to sell the Penguins to BlackBerry co-founder Jim Balsillie. However, Balsillie unexpectedly rescinded his offer two months later after an apparent dispute with the NHL Board of Governors over purchasing conditions, despite Balsillie having earlier pledged to the Board that he would not relocate the team. Lemieux was offended that Balsillie had pulled out at the last minute and initially refused to return Balsillie's deposit, saying that it was in breach of their agreement.

On March 13, 2007, Lemieux's ownership group announced a final agreement for a new multi-purpose arena, eventually to be named Consol Energy Center, to be built across the street from Mellon Arena. The deal keeps the Penguins in Pittsburgh for at least 30 years. Lemieux was instrumental in negotiating this deal, despite outside efforts to move the team to Kansas City. It was later revealed that Lemieux did visit Kansas City only to put pressure on the city and state to push through plans for the new arena.

The Penguins returned to the playoffs, losing in five games to the Ottawa Senators in 2007, and making the Finals in 2008 where they lost in six games to the Detroit Red Wings. On June 12, 2009, Lemieux won his third Stanley Cup title, this time as an owner as the Penguins won a rematch with the Red Wings in the 2009 Stanley Cup Final, in seven games. In 2015, Lemieux and Ron Burkle hired Morgan Stanley to explore the possibility of selling the Penguins. On June 12, 2016, the Penguins defeated the San Jose Sharks in the 2016 Stanley Cup Final, in six games, to give Lemieux his fourth Stanley Cup, his second as an owner. Almost exactly a year later, on June 11, 2017, Lemieux won his third Stanley Cup as an owner upon the Penguins six-game defeat of the Nashville Predators.

== International play ==
Lemieux played for Canada in the 1983 World Junior Championships (bronze medal), 1985 World Championships (silver medal), 1987 Canada Cup (championship), 2002 Winter Olympics (captain, gold medal) and the 2004 World Cup of Hockey (captain, championship).

At the 2002 Winter Olympics, having been selected by Gretzky to captain the roster, the then-36-year-old Lemieux led the Canadian men's team into Salt Lake City, United States. The team had failed to win a gold medal at the Olympics in fifty years but were still considered favourites to win. Lemieux was second to Joe Sakic in team scoring with six points in five games, and led the team to gold by defeating the United States 5–2 in the final game. Lemieux showcased his amazing hockey intelligence during the gold medal game against the United States. With Team Canada trailing 1–0 in the first period, Lemieux made one of the most famous and savvy plays in Olympic hockey history. After a cross-ice pass from Lemieux in the neutral zone, Canadian defenceman Chris Pronger carried the puck across the blue line into the American zone, and fired a pass across the zone. Lemieux then faked like he was receiving the pass and proceeded to take a shot at the net, all while letting the puck slide through his legs, knowing he had forward Paul Kariya streaking behind him. Lemieux's fake caused American goalie Mike Richter to lunge in Lemieux's direction, and thus created a wide-open net for Kariya to fire the puck in, as he received the pass from Pronger after Lemieux let it go to Kariya. During the tournament, his hip injury required several painkilling injections to keep him on the ice, and he only played one more NHL game after the Olympics before being lost for the season.

He would then play in his final international event, once again captaining Team Canada to victory in the 2004 World Cup of Hockey, where he'd be Team Canada's fourth leading scorer, despite being 38 years old, having injuries, and playing in just 10 NHL games that year. Lemieux was also selected by team Canada for the 2006 Winter Olympics, but declined due to health.

== Personal life ==
Early in his career, Lemieux smoked, at one point consuming a pack of cigarettes daily. He gave up the habit, perhaps due to Hodgkin lymphoma.

Lemieux married Nathalie Asselin on June 26, 1993. They have four children: Lauren (born April 1993), Stephanie (born 1995), Austin Nicholas (born 1996), and Alexa (born 1997). Austin was born prematurely, weighing just two pounds, five ounces, but he is perfectly healthy today, and played college hockey at Arizona State University. The family lives in the affluent Pittsburgh suburb of Sewickley. Lemieux also had a second home in Quebec near Mont-Tremblant which was built starting in 2009, costs US$20 million, and came to be known as the Chateau Fleur de Lys; he put the house up for sale in 2018.

Lemieux has opened his home to young Penguins stars such as Marc-André Fleury and Sidney Crosby until they settled into the Pittsburgh area, as he did with Jaromír Jágr following the 1990 NHL entry draft when he lived in Mt. Lebanon, Pennsylvania. He is a naturalized American citizen, and on March 30, 2007, Lemieux, a registered Republican, contributed $2,300 to Democratic US Senator Hillary Clinton's 2008 presidential campaign fund. In the past, he has also made contributions to the re-election fund of Republican former US Senator Rick Santorum.

On June 17, 2009, Lemieux was made a Knight of the National Order of Quebec (CQ) by then Quebec Premier Jean Charest.

In the 2010 Canadian honours, Lemieux was made an Officer of the Order of Canada (OC) from then Governor General Michaëlle Jean.

Lemieux has been criticized for his involvement in multiple sexual assault scandals. In 1992, Lemieux was in the same room while his former teammate Dan Quinn allegedly raped a woman. In 2000, while Lemieux owned the team, the Penguins signed Billy Tibbetts, who was convicted of raping an unconscious 15-year-old girl when he was 17 years old. When asked about the signing, Lemieux said: "I think that’s a great story. That kid faced so much adversity, did his time, came back after three and a half years. To find himself in the NHL is a great accomplishment." In 2021, Lemieux, Penguins assistant general manager Bill Guerin, and the Penguins were sued by Erin Skalde, the ex-wife of former Wilkes-Barre/Scranton Penguins (WBS Penguins) coach Jack Skalde. Erin Skalde alleged that they attempted to cover up her being sexually assaulted by former WBS Penguins coach John Donatelli. Jack Skalde alleged that he was fired after complaining to the team, which he said was a violation of whistleblower laws.

== Charitable causes ==
In 1993, the same year he was diagnosed with Hodgkin lymphoma, Lemieux created the Mario Lemieux Foundation to fund medical research projects. Additionally, the foundation supports other organizations, including the University of Pittsburgh Cancer Institute, the McGowan Institute for Regenerative Medicine, the Leukemia Society, the Lupus Foundation and the Children's Home of Pittsburgh. In 2007, he was among the well-known athletes who founded Athletes for Hope, a charitable organization which helps professional athletes get involved in charitable causes and inspires non-athletes to volunteer and support the community.

With their son, Austin, being born prematurely in 1996, the Lemieux family spent quite a bit of time in the hospital with Austin, including 71 days after his birth. The family found that the older children didn't have a place to play in the hospital. Using the Lemieux Foundation resources, driven by Nathalie's idea and vision, founded a program called "Austin's Playroom Project". The project builds play rooms in various hospitals across the US to give both children who are patients and their healthy siblings a place to play and "be kids" and concentrate on being normal and healing. On January 31, 2014, the foundation announced the opening of the twenty-ninth Austin's Playroom at the new Naval Hospital Camp Pendleton, Camp Pendleton, California.

== Legacy ==
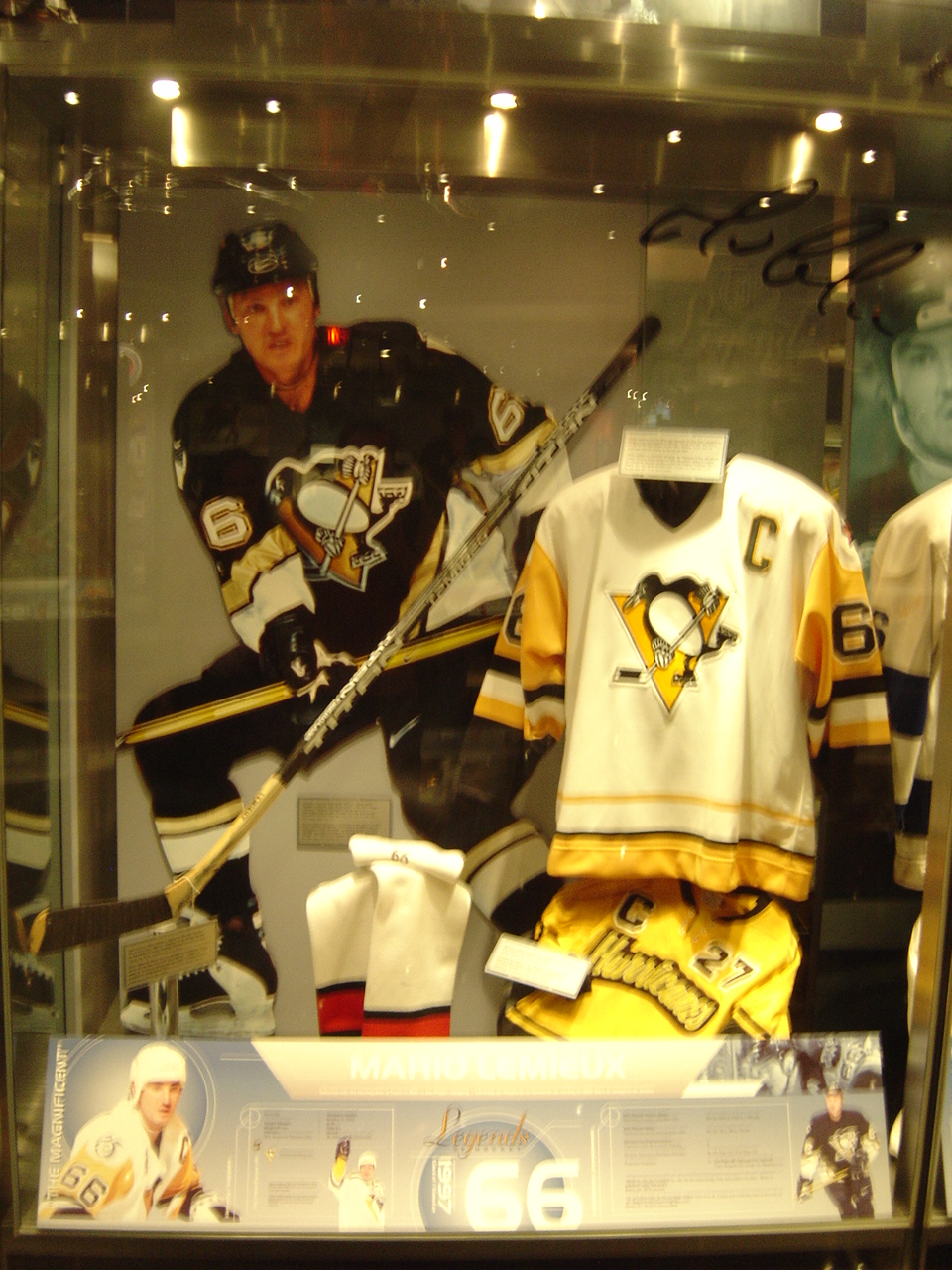
Lemieux exhibit at the Hockey Hall of Fame

A statue in his honour, created by sculptor Bruce Wolfe, was erected in Pittsburgh on March 7, 2012, outside the Consol Energy Center. The statue is modelled after a play in a 1988 game against the New York Islanders where Lemieux slipped in between Islanders defencemen Rich Pilon and Jeff Norton to score a goal in a 5–3 Penguins victory. Both Pilon and Norton (the latter of which would later play for the Penguins during Lemieux's comeback season), as well as the Islanders, are unbranded on their portion of the statue.

In 1992, local confectioner D. L. Clark Company produced a Mario Bar, modelled on the caramel Bun Bar, featuring his image on the packaging and including collectors' trading cards.

== Career statistics ==
Biographical information and career statistics from NHL.com, or Eliteprospects.com, or Eurohockey.com, or Hockey-Reference.com, or The Internet Hockey Database

=== Regular season and playoffs ===
Bold indicates led league

			Regular season					Playoffs
Season	Team	League	GP	G	A	Pts	PIM	GP	G	A	Pts	PIM
1980–81	Montreal-Concordia	QMAAA	47	62	62	124	127	3	2	5	7	8
1981–82	Laval Voisins	QMJHL	64	30	66	96	22	—	—	—	—	—
1982–83	Laval Voisins	QMJHL	66	84	100	184	76	12	14	18	32	18
1983–84	Laval Voisins	QMJHL	70	**133**	**149**	**282**	97	14	29	23	52	29
1983–84	Laval Voisins	M-Cup	—	—	—	—	—	3	1	2	3	0
1984–85	Pittsburgh Penguins	NHL	73	43	57	100	54	—	—	—	—	—
1985–86	Pittsburgh Penguins	NHL	79	48	93	141	43	—	—	—	—	—
1986–87	Pittsburgh Penguins	NHL	63	54	53	107	57	—	—	—	—	—
1987–88	Pittsburgh Penguins	NHL	77	**70**	98	**168**	92	—	—	—	—	—
1988–89	Pittsburgh Penguins	NHL	76	**85**	**114**	**199**	100	11	12	7	19	16
1989–90	Pittsburgh Penguins	NHL	59	45	78	123	78	—	—	—	—	—
1990–91	Pittsburgh Penguins	NHL	26	19	26	45	30	23	**16**	**28**	**44**	16
1991–92	Pittsburgh Penguins	NHL	64	44	87	**131**	94	15	**16**	18	**34**	2
1992–93	Pittsburgh Penguins	NHL	60	69	91	**160**	38	11	8	10	18	10
1993–94	Pittsburgh Penguins	NHL	22	17	20	37	32	6	4	3	7	2
1995–96	Pittsburgh Penguins	NHL	70	**69**	**92**	**161**	54	18	11	16	27	33
1996–97	Pittsburgh Penguins	NHL	76	50	**72**	**122**	65	5	3	3	6	4
2000–01	Pittsburgh Penguins	NHL	43	35	41	76	18	18	6	11	17	4
2001–02	Pittsburgh Penguins	NHL	24	6	25	31	14	—	—	—	—	—
2002–03	Pittsburgh Penguins	NHL	67	28	63	91	43	—	—	—	—	—
2003–04	Pittsburgh Penguins	NHL	10	1	8	9	6	—	—	—	—	—
2005–06	Pittsburgh Penguins	NHL	26	7	15	22	16	—	—	—	—	—
NHL totals			915	690	1,033	1,723	834	107	76	96	172	87

=== International ===
Medal record

Representing Canada

Men's Ice hockey

World Cup
Gold medal – first place	2004 World Cup	

Olympic Games
Gold medal – first place	2002 Salt Lake City	

Canada Cup
Gold medal – first place	1987 Canada	

World Championships
Silver medal – second place	1985 Czechoslovakia	

World Junior Championships
Bronze medal – third place	1983 Soviet Union	

Year	Team	Event	Results	GP	G	A	Pts	PIM
1983	Canada	WJC	3rd place, bronze medalist(s)	7	5	5	10	12
1985	Canada	WC	2nd place, silver medalist(s)	9	4	6	10	2
1987	Canada	CC	1st place, gold medalist(s)	9	11	7	18	8
2002	Canada	OLY	1st place, gold medalist(s)	5	2	4	6	0
2004	Canada	WCH	1st place, gold medalist(s)	6	1	4	5	2
Junior totals				7	5	5	10	12
Senior totals				29	18	21	39	12

=== NHL All-Star Games ===
Year	Location	G	A	P
1985	Calgary	2	1	3
1986	Hartford	0	0	0
1988	St. Louis	3	3	6
1989	Edmonton	0	1	1
1990	Pittsburgh	4	0	4
1992	Philadelphia	0	1	1
1996	Boston	0	2	2
1997	San Jose	2	1	3
2001	Denver	1	1	2
2002	Los Angeles	1	0	1
10 All-Star Games		13	10	23

== Awards ==
=== NHL ===
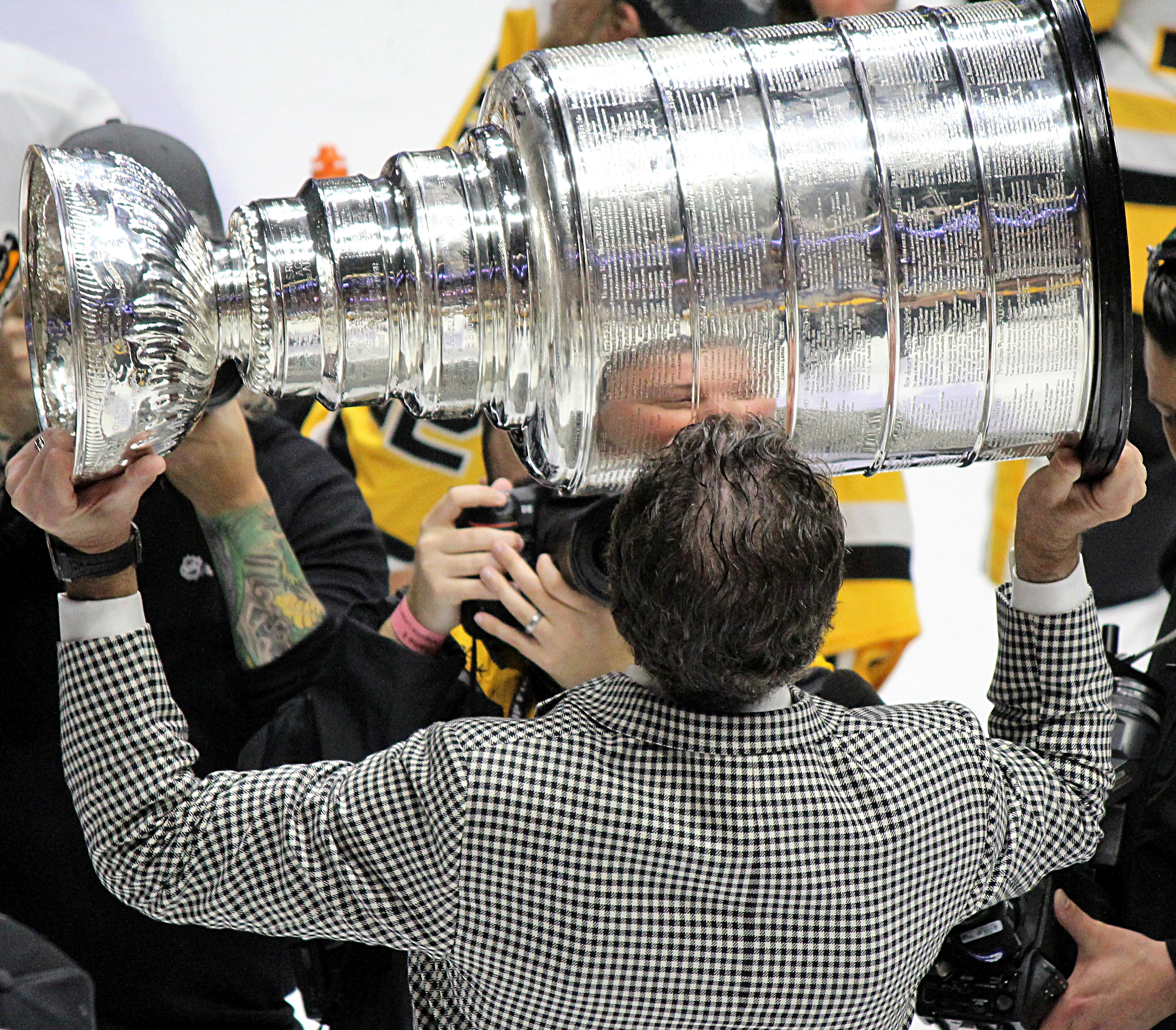
Lemieux holding the Stanley Cup in Nashville, 2017.

National Hockey League
Award	Year
Hockey Hall of Fame	1997
Stanley Cup	1991, 1992, 2009*, 2016*, 2017*
Conn Smythe Trophy	1991, 1992
Art Ross Trophy	1988, 1989, 1992, 1993, 1996, 1997
Lester B. Pearson Award	1986, 1988, 1993, 1996
Hart Memorial Trophy	1988, 1993, 1996
NHL All-Star Game MVP	1985, 1988, 1990
NHL All-Star Game	1985, 1986, 1988, 1989, 1990, 1992, 1993, 1996, 1997, 2001, 2002, 2003
NHL first All-Star team	1988, 1989, 1993, 1996, 1997
NHL second All-Star team	1986, 1987, 1992, 2001
NHL All-Rookie team	1985
Calder Memorial Trophy	1985
NHL Plus/Minus Award	1993
Lester Patrick Trophy	2000
Bill Masterton Trophy	1993

^{*} Stanley cup champion as an owner.

=== International ===
International
Award	Year
IIHF Hall of Fame	2008

=== Other awards ===
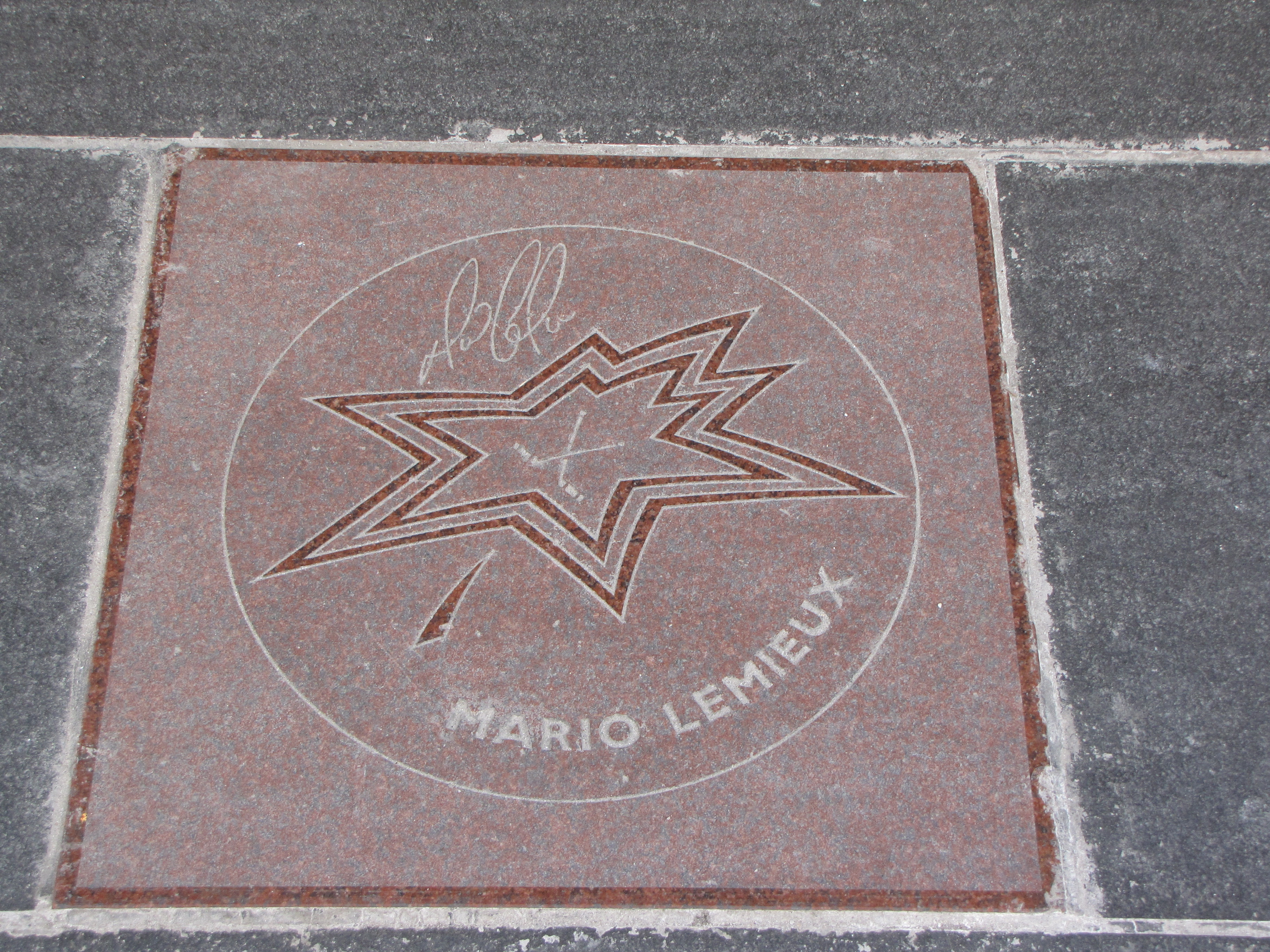
Lemieux's star on Canada's Walk of Fame

- Order of Canada 2009– he was named an Officer of the Order of Canada "for his contributions as one of hockey's most gifted players, as an inspirational role model and mentor, and for supporting charitable initiatives through the Mario Lemieux Foundation".
- National Order of Quebec 2009
- Canada's Walk of Fame 2004
- Order of Hockey in Canada recipient 2016
- In 1998, he was ranked number 4 on The Hockey News' list of the 100 Greatest Hockey Players, the highest-ranking French Canadian player, as well as the highest-ranking who had played his entire career for a single team.
- 3× Chrysler-Dodge/NHL Performer of the Year – 1985, 1986, 1987
- 2× Dapper Dan Athlete of The Year – 1986, 1989
- CHL Player of the Year – 1984
- ESPN Hockey Player of the Decade – 2000
- 3× ESPY Award NHL Player of the Year – 1993, 1994, 1998
- Lou Marsh Trophy – 1993
- His #66 has been retired by the Pittsburgh Penguins, Team Canada, and Laval Titan.
- Named to the IIHF All-Time Canada Team in 2020.
- Inducted into Canada's Sports Hall of Fame in 1998.

== Cultural references ==
- Lemieux had a hockey video game, Mario Lemieux Hockey (1991) for the Sega Genesis, named after him. Additionally, he was featured as the cover athlete on EA Sports' 2002 edition of its popular NHL series for multiple platforms.
- Lemieux was mentioned in the hip hop group A Tribe Called Quest's track "Keep It Rollin'", which was released on the group's third studio album "Midnight Marauders". On the track, rapper Phife Dawg sings: "I skate on your crew, like Mario Lemieux."
- Canadian hardcore band Comeback Kid are named after a newspaper article which nicknamed Mario Lemieux 'the comeback kid'.
- Lemieux appears in NHL 12, 13, 14, and 15 in the game's 'Be A Legend' mode, as well as being a part of the Penguins Alumni team in newer games.
- Many school kids are taught quotation marks as "Lemieuxs and Gretzkys" due to the numbers 66 and 99 looking like handwritten quotation marks.

== Celebrity golf ==
Lemieux has competed at the American Century Championship, an annual competition to determine the best golfers among American sports and entertainment celebrities. He won the tournament in 1998 and has two top-ten finishes. It was this year when he shot a 3-under 69 to earn him the ACC trophy. The tournament, televised by NBC in July, is played at Edgewood Tahoe Golf Course in Lake Tahoe, Nevada.

== See also ==
- 50 goals in 50 games
- List of NHL players with 500 goals
- List of NHL career assists leaders
- List of NHL statistical leaders
- Notable families in the NHL

Awards
Preceded by Pat LaFontaine	CHL Player of the Year; 1984	Succeeded by Dan Hodgson
Preceded by Brian Lawton	NHL first overall draft pick 1984	Succeeded by Wendel Clark
Preceded by Bob Errey	Pittsburgh Penguins first-round draft pick 1984	Succeeded by Doug Bodger
Preceded by Tom Barrasso	Winner of the Calder Memorial Trophy; 1985	Succeeded by Gary Suter
Preceded by Wayne Gretzky; Mark Messier; Eric Lindros	Winner of the Hart Memorial Trophy; 1988; 1993; 1996	Succeeded by Mark Messier; Sergei Fedorov; Dominik Hasek
Preceded by Wayne Gretzky; Wayne Gretzky; Jaromir Jagr	Winner of the Art Ross Trophy; 1988, 1989; 1992, 1993; 1996, 1997	Succeeded by Wayne Gretzky; Wayne Gretzky; Jaromir Jagr
Preceded by Bill Ranford	Winner of the Conn Smythe Trophy; 1991, 1992	Succeeded by Patrick Roy
Preceded by Mark Fitzpatrick	Bill Masterton Trophy Winner; 1993	Succeeded by Cam Neely
Preceded by Paul Ysebaert	Winner of the NHL Plus/Minus Award; 1993	Succeeded by Scott Stevens
Sporting positions
Preceded by Dan Frawley; Ron Francis; Jaromir Jagr	Pittsburgh Penguins captain 1987–1994; 1995–1997; 2001–2006	Succeeded by Ron Francis; Ron Francis; Sidney Crosby
Preceded by Rick Rhoden	American Century Celebrity Golf Classic champion 1998	Succeeded by Rick Rhoden
