= Suhayya Abu-Hakima =

Canadian technology entrepreneur

- Born: Middle East
- Other name: Dr. Suhayya (Sue) Abu-Hakima
- Occupations: Founder and CEO, Alstari Corporation (formerly Amika Mobile Corporation)
- Years active: 1982 to present
- Known for: AI innovations in messaging and security, 2 successful Tech Start-ups
- Awards: Order of Ontario (2011); Queen Elizabeth II Diamond Jubilee Medal (2012); Women of Influence (2014); WXN Top 100 Trail Blazers and Trendsetters (2015); WXN Top 100 Trail Blazers and Trendsetters (2016); US GOVIES Outstanding Emergency Communications Products (2015-2020)
- Website: www.alstari.com

Suhayya "Sue" Abu-Hakima OOnt is a Canadian technology entrepreneur and inventor of artificial intelligence (AI) applications for wireless communication and computer security. As of 2020, her company Amika Mobile has been known as Alstari Corporation as she exited her emergency and communications business to Genasys in October 2020. Since 2007, she had served as president and CEO of Amika Mobile Corporation; she similarly founded and served as president and CEO of AmikaNow! from 1998 to 2004. A frequent speaker on entrepreneurship, AI, security, messaging and wireless, she has published and presented more than 125 professional papers and holds 48 international patents in the fields of content analysis, agents, context, messaging, and security. She has been an adjunct professor in the School of Information Technology and Engineering at the University of Ottawa and Carleton University and has mentored students in high school, undergraduate, and graduate school in science and technology more commonly known as STEM. She was named to the Order of Ontario, the province's highest honor, in 2011 for innovation and her work in public safety and computer security technology. She also received the Queen Elizabeth Jubilee Medal in 2012. She published her book Entrepreneur: Heretic or Hero of Innovation in 2024.

== Early life and education ==
Suhayya Abu-Hakima was born in the Middle East and grew up in Montreal, where her father and mother were both professors at McGill University. She has five siblings.

In 1982 Abu-Hakima graduated from McGill University with a bachelor's degree in engineering, specializing in computers and communications. At Carleton University in Ottawa, she earned her honours master's degree in engineering in 1988 focussed on AI, submitting the thesis, "Rationale: A Tool for Developing Knowledge-based Systems that Explain by Reasoning Explicitly". She earned her honours PhD in artificial intelligence in 1994; her PhD thesis, "Automating Model Acquisition by Fault Knowledge Re-use: Introducing the Diagnostic Remodeler Algorithm", described a machine learning algorithm and was supervised by Professor Nick Dawes of the Computer and Systems Engineering Department and Professor Franz Oppacher of the School of Computer Science at Carleton University. Her pioneering AI publications and startup patents are still cited today, decades later.

== Career ==
Abu-Hakima began her career at Bell-Northern Research after receiving her bachelor's degree in 1982. Her accomplishments included the creation of "speech and hand-printed character recognition applications, the Invisible Terminal and AI for telecom". The Invisible Terminal, which she designed in 1983, facilitated wireless communication between mobile, pad-sized terminals and the main network.

In 1987 she joined the National Research Council Canada, where she developed Artificial Intelligence (AI) applications for "real-world problems" in various fields, including aircraft engine diagnosis and telecommunications network management. She founded and led the Seamless Personal Information Networking laboratory in the NRC's Institute of Information Technology focussed on AI. In 1996 she co-invented a technology for unified messaging networks.

In July 1998 she formed her first startup company, AmikaNow!, which integrated AI applications including automatic email summarization in its wireless software for mobile phones and computers. In 2004, Entrust acquired AmikaNow! Corporation's content analysis, and AI-based email compliance technology that flagged Sarbanes Oxley and Privacy violations, and Abu-Hakima served as Vice President of Content Technology for Entrust from 2004 to 2006.

In March 2007 Abu-Hakima co-founded another startup, Amika Mobile, in Ottawa. Using wireless technology created by AmikaNow!, the new company's flagship product, the Amika Mobility Server, auto-generates connections with mobile phones and computers to deliver emergency converged email, SMS, Pop-up, Voice and any emergency alerts and accepts responses. As of 2015, the company won more than two dozen international awards for its emergency mass notification systems. Amika Mobile has won the US GOVIES awards for 6 consecutive years 2015, 2016 and 2017 2018, 2019 and 2020 before the acquisition by Genasys Inc. Amika Mobile has also won the ASIS 2015 Judge's Choice and Best Security Product.

In October 2020 Abu-Hakima co-founded her third tech start-up after 2 successful exits. Her new start-up is Alstari Corporation focussed on the ethical and secure use of AI for safety and security.

== Other activities ==
Abu-Hakima holds 48 international patents in content analysis, messaging, security and converged emergency alerts. She is a frequent speaker on entrepreneurship, technology, security, emergency communications and AI, and has published and presented more than 125 professional papers.

She has been an adjunct professor in the School of Information Technology and Engineering at the University of Ottawa as well as Carleton University.

She is active as a community volunteer and mentor. In Ottawa and Victoria, Canada, she is credited with the creation of more than 250 high tech jobs focussed on AI, messaging, content analysis, and security in both tech as well as business.

She has given hundreds of presentations and published over 100 papers on AI while working on her graduate studies and while at NRC. She has served as Vice Chair and Director for the Ontario Centres of Excellence, and as an advisor on the Private Sector Advisory Board for the National Centres of Excellence (2007–2014). She has also served in an advisory capacity on the Big Data Institute Advisory Board at Dalhousie University (2013) and currently Simon Fraser University and the strategic advisory board at McGill University (2014). In 2003 she was a member of the Prime Minister's Task Force on Women Entrepreneurs. She has mentored dozens of high school, undergraduate and graduate students for education and careers in science and technology.

She is very active in championing women in business as well as STEM professions. She has been called upon in 2011 and again in 2017 by the Government of Canada Operations Committee as a witness on federal procurement policies and how they affect small business as well as women entrepreneurs in STEM.

From 1994 to 1998 she was an editor of Computational Intelligence, the magazine of the Canadian Artificial Intelligence Organization.

== Honors and awards ==
In 2012 she was a recipient of the Queen Elizabeth II Diamond Jubilee Medal, being noted as "a technology visionary and tireless volunteer".

In January 2011 she was named to the Order of Ontario.

In 2007 she was named an Outstanding Women Entrepreneur by the Canadian Advanced Technology Association.

== Personal ==
Abu-Hakima is the mother of two children. She resides in Kanata, Ontario.

== Selected bibliography ==
- Svetlana Kiritchenko; et al. (2004), "Email Classification with Temporal Features", Intelligent Information Processing and Web Mining, vol. 25, Springer, pp. 523–533, doi:10.1007/978-3-540-39985-8_61, ISBN 978-3-540-21331-4
- Ramiro Liscano; et al. (n.d.). "Integrating Multi-Modal Messages across Heterogeneous Networks" (PDF). National Research Council Canada.
- Suhayya Abu-Hakima; et al. (1997). "A Multi-Agent Systems Approach for Fraud Detection in Personal Communication Systems" (PDF). National Research Council Canada.
- Abu-Hakima, Suhayya (1994). Artificial Intelligence Techniques in Diagnosis: A Review of Approaches, Applications, and Issues. National Research Council Canada.
- Suhayya Abu-Hakima; et al. (1989). "Jet engine technical advisor (JETA)". Proceedings of the 2nd international conference on Industrial and engineering applications of artificial intelligence and expert systems - Volume 1. Vol. 1. pp. 154–160. doi:10.1145/66617.66637. ISBN 978-0-89791-320-1. S2CID 6290183.

== Selected patents ==
- "Alert Broadcasting to Unconfigured Communications Devices" (2013) (with Kenneth E. Grigg)
- "Alert broadcasting to a plurality of diverse communications devices" (2012)
- "Collaborative Multi-Agent System for Dynamic Management of Electronic Services in a Mobile Global Network Environment" (2011) (with Kenneth E. Grigg)
- "Processing of network content and services for mobile or fixed devices" (2011)
- "Auto-discovery of diverse communications devices for alert broadcasting" (2010)
- "Concept Identification System and Method for Use in Reducing and/or Representing Text Content of an Electronic Document" (2004)
- "Apparatus and method for context-based highlighting of an electronic document" (2004)
- "Apparatus and method for interpreting and intelligently managing electronic messages" (2002)
- "Concept-based message/document viewer for electronic communications and internet searching" (2003)
