= Guylène Proulx =

Canadian fire safety researcher (1960–2009)

Guylène Proulx OC
- Born: December 27, 1960
- Died: December 1, 2009 (aged 48); Gatineau, Quebec, Canada
- Citizenship: Canadian
- Education: Université du Québec à Chicoutimi
- Awards: Order of Canada
- Scientific career
- Fields: Architecture
- Workplaces: National Research Council of Canada; Carleton University; Worcester Polytechnic Institute
- Doctoral advisor: Jonathan Sime

Guylène Proulx, OC born on December 27, 1960 and died in Gatineau, Quebec on December 1, 2009, They were a Canadian architect know for their work on fire prevention.

== Biography ==
Proulx earned a doctorate in urban planning from the Université du Québec à Chicoutimi in 1992, under the supervision of Jonathan Sime.

She became a senior researcher in the human factors in fire programme at the urban planning research centre of the National Research Council of Canada. There she developed an expertise in the study of human behaviour in emergencies. Her research included interviews with fire survivors and evacuation experiments in buildings. The National Institute of Standards and Technology selected her to lead research on occupant response and evacuation as part of its investigation into the September 11 attacks.

She was an editor of the Fire Protection Handbook for the National Fire Protection Association and sat on the editorial board of the journal Fire Technology.

== Honours ==
- Public Service of Canada Award of Excellence, 2007
- Officer of the Order of Canada, 2009
- The Society of Fire Protection Engineers created the Dr. Guylène Proulx scholarship in her memory.
