= Calixte Savoie =

Canadian politician (1895–1985)

Senator for L'Acadie, New Brunswick
- In office 1955–1970
- Appointed by: Louis St. Laurent

Personal details
- Born: August 23, 1895 Bouctouche, New Brunswick
- Died: December 2, 1985 (aged 90)
- Party: Independent Liberal

Calixte F. Savoie (August 23, 1895 – December 2, 1985) was a Canadian businessman, school principal, teacher and politician.

Born in Bouctouche, New Brunswick, he was summoned to the Senate of Canada in 1955. An Independent Liberal, he represented the senatorial division of L'Acadie, New Brunswick. He resigned in 1970.

École Calixte-F.-Savoie in Sainte-Anne-de-Kent, New Brunswick is named in his honour.
