= Ernesto Schiffrin =

Canadian physician and cardiovascular researcher

Ernesto L. Schiffrin
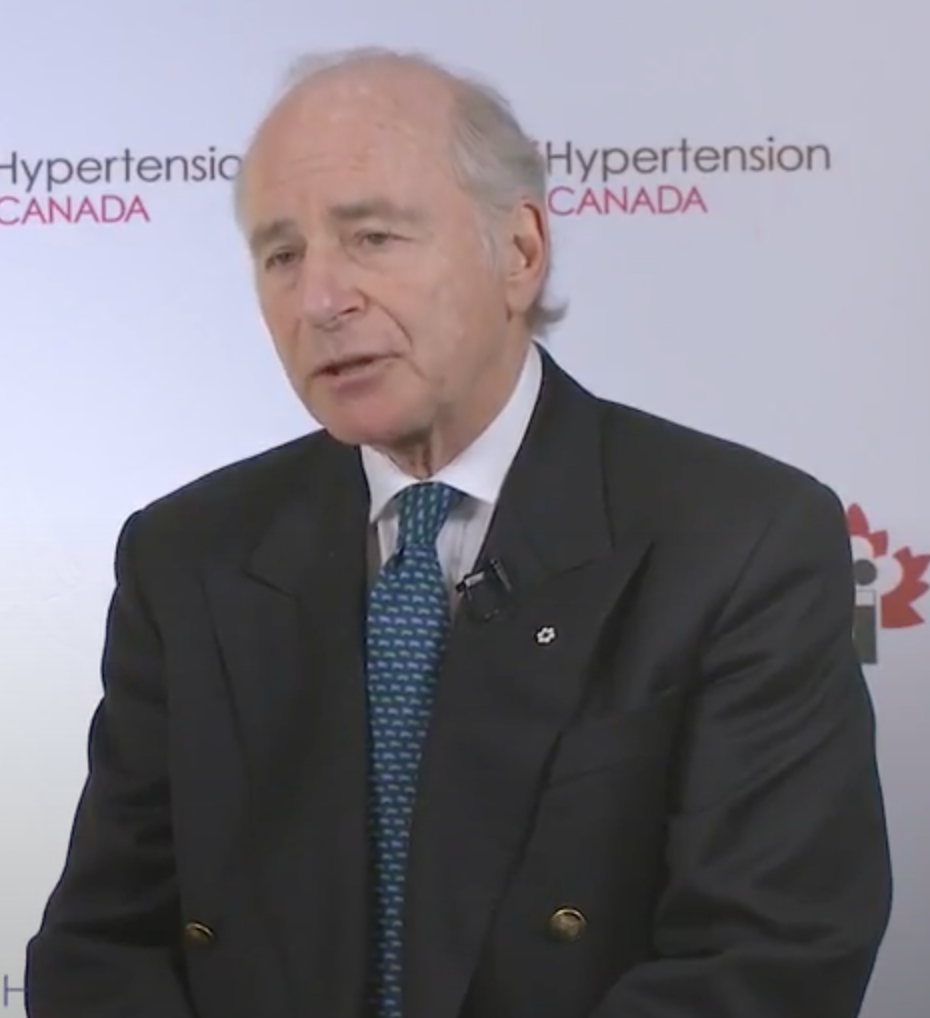
- Schiffrin speaking at Hypertension Canada
- Education: University of Buenos Aires (M.D., 1969); McGill University (Ph.D., 1980)
- Scientific career
- Fields: Medicine; Cardiology
- Institutions: McGill University, Jewish General Hospital

Ernesto Luis Schiffrin CM FRSC is an Argentinian-Canadian physician and researcher specialized in cardiovascular diseases.

Schiffrin is a distinguished James McGill Professor of Medicine at the Department of Medicine, McGill University . Canada Research Chair in Hypertension and Vascular Research at the Lady Davis Institute, and Physician-in-Chief at Jewish General Hospital.

He is known in the cardiovascular research community for his contributions to the understanding of the role of angiotensin II, aldosterone and endothelin hormones in the remodeling mechanisms of small resistance arteries .
