= Bruce Donaldson (admiral) =

Canadian admiral

Alistair Bruce Donaldson
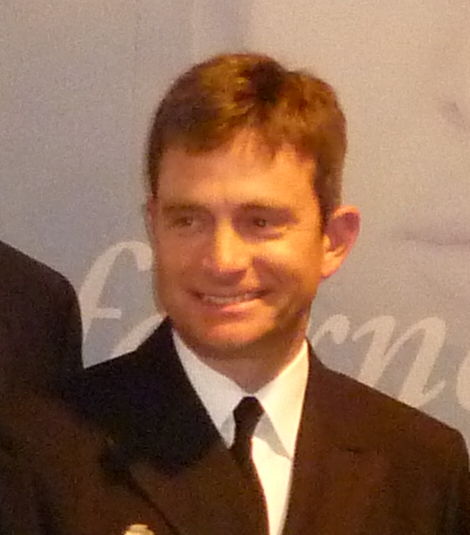
- Donaldson in 2010
- Military career
- Allegiance: Canada
- Branch: Royal Canadian Navy
- Service years: 1977–2013
- Rank: Vice-Admiral
- Awards: Commander of the Order of Military Merit; Canadian Forces' Decoration

Vice-Admiral Alistair Bruce Donaldson CMM CD is a retired officer in the Royal Canadian Navy.

== Career ==
Donaldson completed bachelor's degrees in political science and economics from Carleton University and a master's degree in international relations and maritime strategic studies from Dalhousie University. He also attended the Canadian Forces College, graduating the Command and Staff Course and the National Security Studies Course.

Donaldson received his officer commission in the Canadian Forces in the naval reserves in 1977. He joined the regular force in 1982 as a navigation specialist with Maritime Command (MARCOM). He then served as a weapons officer, combat officer and executive officer.

Donaldson was appointed Vice Chief of the Defence Staff and promoted to the rank of Vice-Admiral effective July 26, 2010. He retired from this post in September 2013.

== Awards and decorations ==
Donaldson's personal awards and decorations include the following:

Ribbon	Description	Notes
	Order of Military Merit (CMM)	Appointed Commander (CMM) on 24 November 2009
	Queen Elizabeth II Golden Jubilee Medal	Decoration awarded in 2002; Canadian version
	Queen Elizabeth II Diamond Jubilee Medal	Decoration awarded in 2012; Canadian version
	Canadian Forces' Decoration (CD)	with two Clasp for 32 years of service

Military offices
Preceded by D. Rouleau	Vice Chief of the Defence Staff; 2010–2013	Succeeded by G. Thibault
