= Awards and decorations of the British Armed Forces =

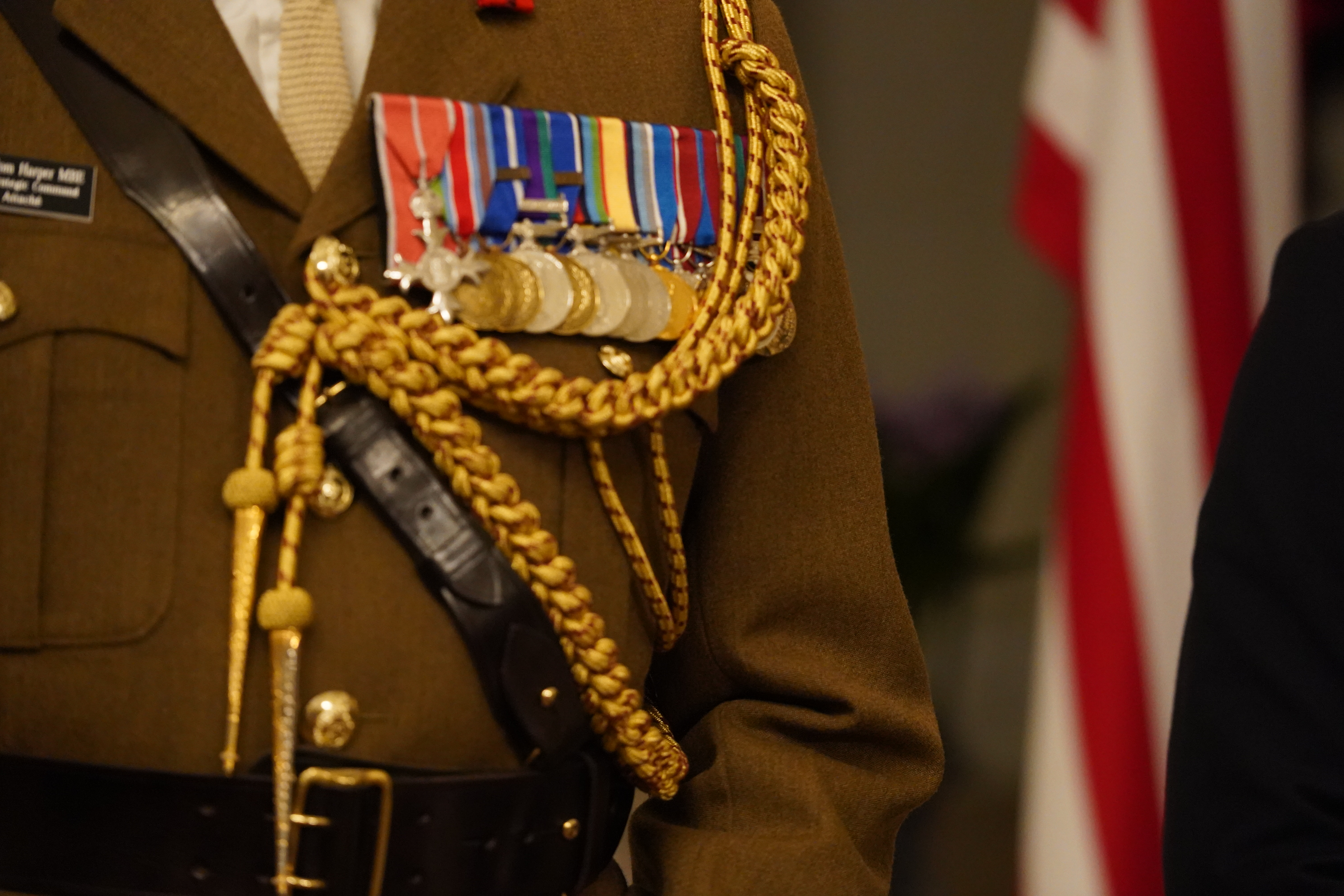
Medals and aiguillette worn by a British Army officer

The British Armed Forces recognises service and personal accomplishments of individuals while a member of the Royal Navy, British Army or Royal Air Force with the awarding of various awards and decorations.

Together with rank and qualification badges, such awards are a means to outwardly display the highlights of a serviceperson's career.

== Order of wear ==
All services use a common order of wear, in accordance with the 2019 order of wear:

1. The Victoria Cross and the George Cross
2. United Kingdom Orders
3. United Kingdom Decorations
4. Order of St John (all classes)
5. United Kingdom Medals for Gallantry and for Distinguished Service
6. United Kingdom Campaign and Operational Service Medals (including authorised United Nations medals and medals of other recognised international organisations). Worn in order of date of award
7. United Kingdom Polar Medals
8. United Kingdom Police Medals for Valuable Service
9. United Kingdom Jubilee, Coronation and Durbar Medals
10. Long Service and Efficiency Awards
11. Commonwealth Orders, Decorations and Medals instituted by the Sovereign. Worn in order of date of award.
12. Commonwealth Orders, Decorations and Medals instituted since 1949 otherwise than by the Sovereign (including those of the States of Malaysia and the State of Brunei). Worn in order of date of award.
13. Foreign Orders. If approved for wear, worn in order of date of award.
14. Foreign Decorations. If approved for wear, worn in order of date of award.
15. Foreign Medals. If approved for wear, worn in order of date of award.

Jubilee, Coronation and Durbar medals were worn before campaign medals until November 1918, after which the order of wear was changed, with them now worn after campaign medals and before long service awards.

== British military medals and ribbons ==
=== Military orders and decorations ===
Emblem	Description	Postnom	Established	Eligibility Period [1]	Remarks
Level 1 Decorations
Ribbon bar image refer to adjacent text	Victoria Cross	VC	5 February 1856	January 1856 – present	For valour in combat.
Ribbon bar image refer to adjacent text	George Cross	GC	24 September 1940	1940 – present	For valour other than in combat.
Orders – First Class
Ribbon bar image refer to adjacent text	Knight/Dame Grand Cross of the Order of the Bath (Military Division)	GCB	27 May 1725	27 May 1725 – present	Prior to 2 January 1815, this grade was known as a Knight Companion of the Order of the Bath.
Ribbon bar image refer to adjacent text	Member of the Order of Merit (Military Division)	OM	23 June 1902	23 June 1902 – present	
Ribbon bar image refer to adjacent text	Knight/Dame Grand Cross of the Order of the British Empire (Military Division)	GBE	24 August 1917	4 June 1917 – present	
Orders – Second Class
Ribbon bar image refer to adjacent text	Knight/Dame Commander of the Order of the Bath (Military Division)	KCB; DCB	2 January 1815	2 January 1815 – present	
Ribbon bar image refer to adjacent text	Knight/Dame Commander of the Order of the British Empire (Military Division)	KBE; DBE	24 August 1917	4 June 1917 – present	
Orders – Third Class
Ribbon bar image refer to adjacent text	Companion of the Order of the Bath (Military Division)	CB	2 January 1815	1815 – present	
Ribbon bar image refer to adjacent text	Commander of the Order of the British Empire (Military Division)	CBE	24 August 1917	4 June 1917 – present	
Level 2A Decoration (Order)
Ribbon bar image refer to adjacent text	Companion of the Distinguished Service Order	DSO	9 November 1886	1885 – present	From October 1993 awarded for leadership only, replaced for gallantry by Conspicuous Gallantry Cross.
Orders – Fourth Class
Ribbon bar image refer to adjacent text	Officer of the Order of the British Empire (Military Division)	OBE	24 August 1917	4 June 1917 – present	
Orders – Fifth Class
Ribbon bar image refer to adjacent text	Member of the Order of the British Empire (Military Division)	MBE	24 August 1917	4 June 1917 – present	
Level 2A Indian Order (Decoration)
Ribbon bar image refer to adjacent text	Indian Order of Merit (1st Class) (Military Division)	IOM		1837–1911	Replaced by the VC in 1911.
Ribbon bar image refer to adjacent text	Indian Order of Merit (2nd Class) (Military Division)	IOM		1837–1947	
Ribbon bar image refer to adjacent text	Indian Order of Merit (3rd Class) (Military Division)	IOM		1837–1947	
Level 2A Decorations
Ribbon bar image refer to adjacent text	Conspicuous Gallantry Cross	CGC	October 1993	1993 – present	
Ribbon bar image refer to adjacent text	Royal Red Cross (Class I)	RRC	27 April 1883	1883 – present	
Level 3A Decorations
Ribbon bar image refer to adjacent text	Distinguished Service Cross	DSC	June 1901	1901 – present	Awarded only to officers until 1993.
Ribbon bar image refer to adjacent text	Military Cross	MC	December 1914	1914 – present	Awarded only to officers until 1993.
Ribbon bar image refer to adjacent text	Distinguished Flying Cross	DFC	June 1918	1918 – present	Awarded only to officers until 1993.
Ribbon bar image refer to adjacent text	Air Force Cross	AFC	3 June 1918	1918 – present	Awarded only to officers until 1993.
Ribbon bar image refer to adjacent text	Royal Red Cross (Class II)	ARRC	27 April 1883	1917 – present	
Ribbon bar image refer to adjacent text	Order of British India (First Class)	OBI		1837–1947	
Ribbon bar image refer to adjacent text	Order of British India (Second Class)	OBI		1837–1947	
Level 2B Medals
Ribbon bar image refer to adjacent text	Distinguished Conduct Medal	DCM	1854	1854–1993	Replaced in October 1993 by the Conspicuous Gallantry Cross.
Ribbon bar image refer to adjacent text	Conspicuous Gallantry Medal	CGM		1874–1993	Replaced in October 1993 by the Conspicuous Gallantry Cross.
Ribbon bar image refer to adjacent text	Conspicuous Gallantry Medal (Flying)	CGM	1874	1874–1993	Replaced in October 1993 by the Conspicuous Gallantry Cross.
Ribbon bar image refer to adjacent text	George Medal	GM	September 1940	1940 – present	
Ribbon bar image refer to adjacent text	Royal West African Frontier Force Distinguished Conduct Medal		1907	1907–1942	
Ribbon bar image refer to adjacent text	King's African Rifles Distinguished Conduct Medal		1907	1907–1942	
Level 3B Medals
Ribbon bar image refer to adjacent text	Indian Distinguished Service Medal	IDSM	June 1907	1907–1947	
Ribbon bar image refer to adjacent text	Distinguished Service Medal	DSM	October 1914	1914–1993	Equivalent awards for ORs to similarly named crosses for officers.
Ribbon bar image refer to adjacent text	Military Medal	MM	25 March 1916	1916–1993	Equivalent awards for ORs to similarly named crosses for officers.
Ribbon bar image refer to adjacent text	Distinguished Flying Medal	DFM	June 1918	1918–1993	Equivalent awards for ORs to similarly named crosses for officers.
Ribbon bar image refer to adjacent text	Air Force Medal	AFM	3 June 1918	1918–1993	Equivalent awards for ORs to similarly named crosses for officers.
Ribbon bar image refer to adjacent text	Sea Gallantry Medal	SGM	10 August 1854	1854 – present	
Ribbon bar image refer to adjacent text	Burma Gallantry Medal	BGM	10 May 1940	1940–1948	
Ribbon bar image refer to adjacent text	King's Gallantry Medal	KGM	20 June 1974	1974 – present	
Ribbon bar image refer to adjacent text	British Empire Medal (Military Division)	BEM	24 August 1917	4 June 1917 – 1993; 2012–present	
Ribbon bar image refer to adjacent text	King's Volunteer Reserves Medal	KVRM	1999	1999 – present	
Level 4 Commendations
	Mentioned in Dispatches	—	1919	1914 – present	Insignia attached to appropriate campaign medal; if no campaign medal awarded, insignia attached after any medal ribbons
	King's/Queen's Commendation for Brave Conduct	—	1943	1939–1994	Insignia attached to appropriate campaign medal; if no campaign medal awarded, insignia attached after any medal ribbons
	King's/Queen's Commendation for Valuable Service in the Air	—	1942	1939–1994	Insignia attached to appropriate campaign medal; if no campaign medal awarded, insignia attached after any medal ribbons
	King's Commendation for Bravery	—	1994	1994 – present	Insignia attached to appropriate campaign medal; if no campaign medal awarded, insignia attached after any medal ribbons
	King's Commendation for Bravery in the Air	—	1994	1994 – present	Insignia attached to appropriate campaign medal; if no campaign medal awarded, insignia attached after any medal ribbons
	King's Commendation for Valuable Service	—	1994	1993 – present	Insignia attached to appropriate campaign medal; if no campaign medal awarded, insignia attached after any medal ribbons

Note [1] Eligibility period start dates reflect respective establishment dates, except where available evidence indicates otherwise.

=== Military campaign medals ===
Emblem	Description	Established	Eligibility Period	Remarks
18th Century Campaign Medals
Yellow Cord	Monghyr Mutiny Medal	1766	1766	HEIC Issue. Awarded to Native officers who helped quell a mutiny among European troops.
Yellow Cord	Deccan Medal	1784	1778–1784	HEIC Issue. Awarded in gold to Subadars, silver gilt to Jemadars and other native officers, and silver to 'native' non-commissioned officers and soldiers.
Yellow Cord	Mysore Medal	1 April 1793	1790–1792	HEIC Issue. Awarded in gold to Subadars, silver gilt to Jemadars and Serrangs, and silver to 'native' non-commissioned officers and soldiers.
19th Century Campaign Medals
Ribbon bar image refer to adjacent text	Seringapatam Medal	1801	March 1799 – 8 May 1799	HEIC Issue. Awarded in gold, silver gilt, silver, bronze and tin dependent upon rank and position to both British and native soldiers. Authorised for British Army wear on 29 August 1815. Several other ribbons were worn unofficially.
Yellow Cord	Medal for Egypt	31 July 1802	8 March – 31 August 1801	HEIC Issue. Awarded in gold to senior officers, and silver to all others eligible.
Ribbon bar image refer to adjacent text	Army Gold Medal	1806	1808–1814	Issued to senior officers with battle/action clasps where appropriate.
Yellow Cord	Capture of Ceylon Medal	15 May 1807	1795–1796	HEIC Issue. Awarded in gold to 'native' officers, and silver to 'native' non-commissioned officers and soldiers.
Ribbon bar image refer to adjacent text	Army Gold Cross	1810	1808–1814	Issued to senior officers with battle/action clasps where appropriate.
Yellow Cord	Medal for capture of Rodrigues, Isle of Bourbon and Isle of France	1811	1809-1810	HEIC Issue. Awarded in gold to native officers, and silver to native non-commissioned officers and soldiers.
Yellow Cord	Java Medal	1812	1811	HEIC Issue. Awarded in gold to more senior native officers, and silver to native non-commissioned officers and soldiers.
Ribbon bar image refer to adjacent text	Waterloo Medal	1816	16–18 June 1815	
Ribbon bar image refer to adjacent text	Nepal Medal	1816	1814–1816	HEIC Issue. Awarded to native officers and to selected native non-commissioned officers and soldiers.
Ribbon bar image refer to adjacent text	Ceylon Medal	1819	1818	HEIC Issue. Awarded to selected native and European non-commissioned officers and soldiers.
Ribbon bar image refer to adjacent text	Burma Medal	1826	1824–1826	HEIC Issue. Awarded in gold to native officers and silver to native non-commissioned officers and soldiers.
Yellow Cord	Coorg Medal	1837	1837	HEIC Issue. Awarded to selected members of local forces.
Ribbon bar image refer to adjacent text	Ghuznee Medal	1839	21–23 July 1839	HEIC Issue.
Ribbon bar image refer to adjacent text	Candahar, Ghuznee, Cabul Medal	1842	1839–1842	HEIC Issue.
Ribbon bar image refer to adjacent text	Jellalabad Medals	1842	November 1841 – 16 April 1842	HEIC Issue.
Ribbon bar image refer to adjacent text	Medal for the Defence of Kelat-I-Ghilzie	1842	February – May 1842	HEIC Issue.
Ribbon bar image refer to adjacent text	China War Medal (1842)	1843	5 July 1840 – 29 August 1842	Issued with clasps for Second China War where appropriate.
Ribbon bar image refer to adjacent text	Scinde Medal	22 September 1843	1842–1843	HEIC Issue. Issued in one of three types: "Meeanee 1843", "Hyderabad 1843" and "Meeanee/Hyderabad 1843".
Ribbon bar image refer to adjacent text	Gwalior Star	1843	1843	HEIC Issue, issued for the Battle of Gwalior, which was fought at Maharajpur and Panihaar. Medals indicated in central disc of star the battleground for which it was issued
Ribbon bar image refer to adjacent text	Maharajpoor Star	1843	29 December 1843	HEIC Issue.
Ribbon bar image refer to adjacent text	Punniar Star	1843	29 December 1843	HEIC Issue.
Ribbon bar image refer to adjacent text	Sutlej Medal	17 April 1846	7 September 1845 – 14 March 1849	HEIC Issue. Issued with battle/action clasps where appropriate.
Ribbon bar image refer to adjacent text	Naval General Service Medal	1847	1793–1840	Always issued with battle/action clasps.
Ribbon bar image refer to adjacent text	Military General Service Medal	1 June 1847	1793–1814	Always issued with battle/action clasps.
Ribbon bar image refer to adjacent text	Punjab Medal	2 April 1849	7 September 1848 – 14 March 1849	HEIC Issue. Issued with battle/action clasps where appropriate.
Ribbon bar image refer to adjacent text	Army of India Medal	21 March 1851	1803–1826	HEIC Issue. Always issued with battle/action clasps.
Ribbon bar image refer to adjacent text	India General Service Medal (1854)	11 March 1854	1852–1895	Issued in silver. From 1885, issued in bronze to non-enlisted support personnel. Always issued with battle/action clasps.
Ribbon bar image refer to adjacent text	South Africa Medal (1854)	1854	1834–1835; 1846–1847; 1850–1853	
Ribbon bar image refer to adjacent text	Crimean War Medal	15 December 1854	1854–1856	Issued with battle/action clasps where appropriate.
Ribbon bar image refer to adjacent text	Baltic Medal	23 April 1856	1854–1855	
Ribbon bar image refer to adjacent text	Indian Mutiny Medal	1858	1857–1858	Issued with battle/action clasps where appropriate.
Ribbon bar image refer to adjacent text	Second China War Medal	6 March 1861	1856–1860	Issued with battle/action clasps where appropriate.
Ribbon bar image refer to adjacent text	New Zealand War Medal	1869	1845–1848; 1860–1866	
Ribbon bar image refer to adjacent text	Abyssinian War Medal	1869	October 1867 – April 1868	
Ribbon bar image refer to adjacent text	Canada General Service Medal	1899	1866–1870	
Ribbon bar image refer to adjacent text	Ashantee Medal	June 1874	1873–1874	
Ribbon bar image refer to adjacent text	South Africa Medal (1880)	August 1880	1877–1879	Issued with campaign clasp where appropriate.
Ribbon bar image refer to adjacent text	Afghanistan Medal	1881	1878–1880	
Ribbon bar image refer to adjacent text	Kabul to Kandahar Star	March 1881	1880	
Ribbon bar image refer to adjacent text	Egypt Medal	October 1882	1882–1889	
Ribbon bar image refer to adjacent text	Royal Niger Company’s Medal	1899	1886–1897	Issued by the Royal Niger Company for minor military operations.
Ribbon bar image refer to adjacent text	East and West Africa Medal	1892	13 November 1887 – 8 May 1900	
Ribbon bar image refer to adjacent text	Central Africa Medal	1895	1891–1894	Issued in silver to combatants and in bronze to support personnel.
Ribbon bar image refer to adjacent text	India General Service Medal (1895)	1 April 1896	3 March 1895 – 10 March 1902	Always issued with appropriate campaign clasps.
Ribbon bar image refer to adjacent text	Ashanti Star	1896	1895–1896	
Ribbon bar image refer to adjacent text	Queen's Sudan Medal	1899	1896–1898	
Ribbon bar image refer to adjacent text	East and Central Africa Medal	1899	20 July 1897 – 2 May 1899	Always issued with appropriate campaign clasps.
Ribbon bar image refer to adjacent text	Queen's South Africa Medal	April 1901	11 October 1899 – 31 May 1902	Issued in silver to officers and enlisted personnel and in bronze to non-enlisted support personnel. Issued with appropriate battle or state clasps where appropriate.
Ribbon bar image refer to adjacent text	Queen's Mediterranean Medal	1902	1899–1902	
20th Century Campaign Medals
Pre–World War
Ribbon bar image refer to adjacent text	Third China War Medal	1901	1900	Issued in silver to officers and enlisted personnel and in bronze to non-enlisted support personnel. Issued with battle/action clasps where appropriate.
Ribbon bar image refer to adjacent text	Ashanti Medal	1901	March – December 1901	
Ribbon bar image refer to adjacent text	King's South Africa Medal	1902	1 January – 1 June 1902	Issued with clasps South Africa 1901 and South Africa 1902 where appropriate.
Ribbon bar image refer to adjacent text	Africa General Service Medal	1902	1900–1956	
Ribbon bar image refer to adjacent text	Transport Medal	1903	1899–1902	For South Africa or China.
Ribbon bar image refer to adjacent text	Tibet Medal	1 February 1905	13 December 1903 – 23 September 1904	Issued in silver to officers and enlisted personnel and in bronze to non-enlisted support personnel.
Ribbon bar image refer to adjacent text	India General Service Medal (1909)	1 January 1909	1908–1935	Issued in silver to officers and enlisted personnel and, during 1908–1912, in bronze to non-enlisted support personnel. Always issued with appropriate campaign clasps.
World War I
Ribbon bar image refer to adjacent text	1914 Star	April 1917	5 August – 22 November 1914	Issued with clasp 5 August – 22 November 1914 where appropriate.
Ribbon bar image refer to adjacent text	1914-15 Star	December 1918	5 August 1914 – 31 December 1915	
Ribbon bar image refer to adjacent text	British War Medal	26 July 1919	5 August 1914 – 11 November 1918	Issued in silver to officers and enlisted soldiers and in bronze to non-enlisted support personnel.
Ribbon bar image refer to adjacent text	Victory Medal	1 September 1919	5 August 1914 – 11 November 1918; 1919–1920; 11 November 1918 – 30 November 1919	World War 1. Issued with MID oak leaf cluster where appropriate. British Naval Mission to Russia; North Sea mine clearance
Ribbon bar image refer to adjacent text	Territorial Force War Medal	April 1920	4 August 1914 – 11 November 1918	
Ribbon bar image refer to adjacent text	Mercantile Marine War Medal	1 September 1919	4 August 1914 – 11 November 1918	
Inter-World War
Ribbon bar image refer to adjacent text	Naval General Service Medal (1915)	6 August 1915	1909 – 23 December 1962	Always issued with appropriate campaign clasps.
Ribbon bar image refer to adjacent text	General Service Medal (1918)	19 January 1923	12 November 1918 – 23 December 1962	Always issued with appropriate campaign clasps.
Ribbon bar image refer to adjacent text	India General Service Medal (1936)	3 August 1938	1936–1939	Always issued with appropriate campaign clasps. Issued with MID oak leaf where appropriate.
World War II
Ribbon bar image refer to adjacent text	1939–45 Star	July 1943	3 September 1939 – 2 September 1945	Issued with clasps Battle of Britain or Bomber Command where appropriate.
Ribbon bar image refer to adjacent text	Atlantic Star	May 1945	3 September 1939 – 8 May 1945	Issued with clasps Air Crew Europe or France and Germany where appropriate.
Ribbon bar image refer to adjacent text	Arctic Star	December 2012	3 September 1939 – 8 May 1945	Awarded for any length of operational service north of the Arctic Circle by members of the British Armed Forces and the Merchant Navy. The qualifying period recognises the particular severity of the conditions experienced by those who served in the Arctic.
Ribbon bar image refer to adjacent text	Air Crew Europe Star	May 1945	3 September 1939 – 5 June 1944	Issued with clasps Atlantic or France and Germany where appropriate.
Ribbon bar image refer to adjacent text	Africa Star	July 1943	10 June 1940 – 12 May 1943	Issued with clasps 8th Army or 1st Army or North Africa 1942 – 43 where appropriate.
Ribbon bar image refer to adjacent text	Pacific Star	May 1945	8 December 1941 – 2 September 1945	Issued with clasp Burma where appropriate.
Ribbon bar image refer to adjacent text	Burma Star	May 1945	11 December 1941 – 2 September 1945	Issued with clasp Pacific where appropriate.
Ribbon bar image refer to adjacent text	Italy Star	May 1945	11 June 1943 – 8 May 1945	
Ribbon bar image refer to adjacent text	France and Germany Star	May 1945	6 June 1944 – 8 May 1945	Issued with clasp Atlantic where appropriate.
Ribbon bar image refer to adjacent text	Defence Medal	16 August 1945	3 September 1939 – 2 September 1945	Issued with KCBC silver oak leaf where appropriate.
Ribbon bar image refer to adjacent text	War Medal 1939–1945	16 August 1945	3 September 1939 – 2 September 1945	Issued with MID bronze oak leaf or KCBC silver oak leaf where appropriate.
Ribbon bar image refer to adjacent text	India Service Medal	6 June 1946	3 September 1939 – 2 September 1945	
Ribbon bar image refer to adjacent text	Canadian Volunteer Service Medal	22 October 1943	3 September 1939 – 1 March 1947	Issued with Maple Leaf, Dieppe, Hong Kong or Bomber Command clasps where appropriate.
Ribbon bar image refer to adjacent text	Africa Service Medal	23 December 1943	6 September 1939 – 2 September 1945	Awarded by the Union of South Africa. Issued with the King's Commendation (South Africa) (1939–45) emblem where appropriate.
Ribbon bar image refer to adjacent text	Australia Service Medal	November 1949	3 September 1939 – 2 September 1945	
Ribbon bar image refer to adjacent text	New Zealand War Service Medal	30 September 1948	3 September 1939 – 2 September 1945	
Ribbon bar image refer to adjacent text	Southern Rhodesia Medal for War Service	1948	1939–1945	
Ribbon bar image refer to adjacent text	Newfoundland Volunteer War Service Medal	17 December 1993	3 September 1939 – 2 September 1945	
Post–World War
Ribbon bar image refer to adjacent text	Korea Medal	July 1951	1 July 1950 – 27 July 1953	
Ribbon bar image refer to adjacent text	Nuclear Test Medal	21 November 2022	1952–1967	Issued for service as part of the UK's nuclear weapons testing programmes
Ribbon bar image refer to adjacent text	General Service Medal (1962)	6 October 1964	24 December 1962 – 31 July 2007	Always issued with appropriate campaign clasps. Replaced 1918 GSM.
Ribbon bar image refer to adjacent text	Rhodesia Medal	1980	1 December 1979 – 20 March 1980	Recipients also received the Zimbabwean Independence Medal, although this is not authorised for wear
Ribbon bar image refer toadjacent text	South Atlantic Medal	1982	2 April – 12 July 1982	Issued with Rosette for service between 35° and 60° South.
Ribbon bar image refer to adjacent text	South Atlantic Medal	1982	2 April – 21 October 1982	Issued without Rosette for service between 7° and 60° South
Ribbon bar image refer to adjacent text	Gulf Medal	1992	2 August 1990 – 7 March 1991	Issued with clasp August 1990 or 6 January to 28 February 1991 where appropriate.
21st Century Campaign Medals
See below	Operational Service Medal (OSM)	1 January 2000	See below	Replaced General Service Medal 1962. Issued with a separate ribbon for each campaign.
Ribbon bar image refer to adjacent text	OSM Sierra Leone	2002	5 May 2000 – 31 July 2002	Issued with Rosette for Op BARRAS or Op MAIDENLY where appropriate.
Ribbon bar image refer to adjacent text	OSM Afghanistan	2003	11 September 2001 – present	Issued with Afghanistan or Operation Pitting clasps where appropriate.
Ribbon bar image refer to adjacent text	OSM Democratic Republic of Congo	2005	14 June 2003 – 10 September 2003	Always issued with Clasp DROC.
Ribbon bar image refer to adjacent text	Iraq Medal	23 February 2004	20 January 2003 – 22 May 2011	Issued with clasp 19 March to 28 April 2003 where appropriate.
Ribbon bar image refer to adjacent text	Iraq Reconstruction Service Medal	26 June 2004	19 March 2003 – 2013	
Ribbon bar image refer to adjacent text	Civilian Service Medal (Afghanistan)	6 April 2011	9 November 2001 – present	
Ribbon bar image refer to adjacent text	Ebola Medal	11 June 2015	23 March 2014 – 29 March 2016	First UK campaign medal issued for response to humanitarian crisis.
Ribbon bar image refer to adjacent text	General Service Medal (2008)	2015	January 2008 – present	New GSM Medal for recipients that do not qualify for other medals. Always issued with appropriate clasps.
Ribbon bar image refer to adjacent text	OSM Iraq and Syria	2018	26 September 2014 – present	Issued with Clasp Iraq and Syria for service in area of operations.
Ribbon bar image refer to adjacent text	Humanitarian Medal	2023	9 September 2023 – present	General medal issued for humanitarian service. Always issued with appropriate clasps
Ribbon bar image refer to adjacent text	Wider Service Medal	2024	11 December 2018 – present	General medal issued for service on operations that do not meet criteria for GSM or other campaign medals.

=== Coronation, Jubilee and Durbar medals ===
Emblem	Description	Established	Date of Event	Remarks
Ribbon bar image refer to adjacent text	Queen Victoria Golden Jubilee Medal	1887	21 June 1887	Issued in Gold, Silver or Bronze
Ribbon bar image refer to adjacent text	Queen Victoria Diamond Jubilee Medal	1897	20 June 1897	Issued in Gold, Silver or Bronze
Ribbon bar image refer to adjacent text	King Edward VII Coronation Medal	1902	26 June 1902	Issued in Silver or Bronze
Ribbon bar image refer to adjacent text	King Edward VII Delhi Durbar Medal	1903	January 1903	Issued in Gold or Silver
Ribbon bar image refer to adjacent text	King George V Coronation Medal	1911	23 June 1911	Civil/Military award
Ribbon bar image refer to adjacent text	King George V Delhi Durbar Medal	1911	December 1911	Issued in Gold or Silver
Ribbon bar image refer to adjacent text	King George V Silver Jubilee Medal	1935	6 May 1935	
Ribbon bar image refer to adjacent text	King George VI Coronation Medal	1937	12 May 1937	
Ribbon bar image refer to adjacent text	Queen Elizabeth II Coronation Medal	1953	2 June 1953	
Ribbon bar image refer to adjacent text	Queen Elizabeth II Silver Jubilee Medal	1977	6 February 1977	
Ribbon bar image refer to adjacent text	Queen Elizabeth II Golden Jubilee Medal	2002	6 February 2002	
Ribbon bar image refer to adjacent text	Queen Elizabeth II Diamond Jubilee Medal	2012	6 February 2012	
Ribbon bar image refer to adjacent text	Queen Elizabeth II Platinum Jubilee Medal	2022	6 February 2022	On 12 November 2020, the British Government announced that a Queen Elizabeth II Platinum Jubilee Medal would be struck and awarded in 2022. The Platinum Jubilee Medal was awarded to people who work in public service, including representatives of the Armed Forces, the emergency services and the prison services.
Ribbon bar image refer to adjacent text	King Charles III Coronation Medal	2023	6 May 2023	

=== Efficiency and long service decorations and medals ===
Emblem	Description	Post nom	Estab.	Eligibility Period	Remarks
Meritorious Service
Ribbon bar image refer to adjacent text	Meritorious Service Medal (Army)	—		1845 – present	
Ribbon bar image refer to adjacent text	Meritorious Service Medal (Royal Navy)	—	1919	1928 – present	
Ribbon bar image refer to adjacent text	Meritorious Service Medal (Royal Marines)	—	1849	1947 – present	
Ribbon bar image refer to adjacent text	Meritorious Service Medal (Royal Air Force)	—	1918	1928 – present	
Accumulated Campaign Service
Ribbon bar image refer to adjacent text	Accumulated Campaign Service Medal	—	1994	1969–2011	Replaced with ACSM 11
Ribbon bar image refer to adjacent text	Accumulated Campaign Service Medal	—	2011	2008 – present	Qualifying period reduced from 36 to 24 months
Long Service and Good Conduct
Ribbon bar image refer to adjacent text	Army Long Service and Good Conduct Medal	—		1830–1930	Army
Ribbon bar image refer to adjacent text	Medal for Long Service and Good Conduct (Military)	—		1930 – present	Army
Ribbon bar image refer to adjacent text	Naval Long Service and Good Conduct Medal (1830)	—		1830–1847	Navy
Ribbon bar image refer to adjacent text	Naval Long Service and Good Conduct Medal (1848)	—		1848 – present	Navy
Meritorious Service (resumed)
Ribbon bar image refer to adjacent text	Medal for Meritorious Service (Royal Navy)	MSM		1918–1928	
Long Service and Good Conduct (resumed)
Ribbon bar image refer to adjacent text	Indian Long Service and Good Conduct Medal	—			For Europeans of the Indian Army.
Meritorious Service (resumed)
Ribbon bar image refer to adjacent text	Indian Meritorious Service Medal	—			For Europeans of the Indian Army.
	Royal Marines Meritorious Service Medal	—		1849–1947	
	Royal Air Force Meritorious Service Medal	—		1918–1928	
Long Service and Good Conduct (resumed)
	Royal Air Force Long Service and Good Conduct Medal	—		1919 – present	Air Force
	Medal for Long Service and Good Conduct (Ulster Defence Regiment)	—			
	Permanent Forces of the Empire Beyond the Seas Medal	—	1909	1919–1932	
Ribbon bar image refer to adjacent text	Indian Long Service and Good Conduct Medal (for the Indian Army)	—			
	Royal West African Frontier Force Long Service and Good Conduct Medal	—			
	Royal Sierra Leone Military Forces Long Service and Good Conduct Medal	—			
	King's African Rifles Long Service and Good Conduct Medal	—			
Meritorious Service (resumed)
Ribbon bar image refer to adjacent text	Indian Meritorious Service Medal (for the Indian Army)	—			
	Hong Kong Disciplined Services Medal	—			
	Operational Service Medal (Bermuda)	–	2025	1965 – present	For operational service by members of the Royal Bermuda Regiment
Part Time Forces Long Service
	Army Emergency Reserve Decoration	ERD			
Ribbon bar image refer to adjacent text	Volunteer Officers' Decoration	VD		1892–1930	
	Volunteer Long Service Medal	—		1894–1930	HAC ribbon
Ribbon bar image refer to adjacent text	Volunteer Officers' Decoration for India and the Colonies	VD		1894–1899	
Ribbon bar image refer to adjacent text	Volunteer Long Service Medal for India and the Colonies	—		1896–1930	
Ribbon bar image refer to adjacent text	Colonial Auxiliary Forces Officers' Decoration	VD			1921–1927
Ribbon bar image refer to adjacent text	Colonial Auxiliary Forces Long Service Medal	—			
Gunnery
Ribbon bar image refer to adjacent text	Naval Good Shooting Medal	—	1903	1903–14	
Part Time Forces Long Service (resumed)
	Militia Long Service Medal	—	1904	1904–1930	
	Imperial Yeomanry Long Service Medal	—	1904	1904–1908	
Ribbon bar image refer to adjacent text	Territorial Decoration	TD	1908	1908–1999	
Ribbon bar image refer to adjacent text	Territorial Decoration (HAC)	TD	1908	1908–1999	
	Ceylon Armed Services Long Service Medal	—	1968	1968–1972	
Ribbon bar image refer to adjacent text	Efficiency Decoration	TD/ED		1930–	
Ribbon bar image refer to adjacent text	Efficiency Decoration (HAC)	TD		1930–1999	
Ribbon bar image refer to adjacent text	Efficiency Decoration (T&AVR)	TD		1967–1999	
	Territorial Force Efficiency Medal	—	1908	1908–1921	
	Territorial Efficiency Medal	—	1921	1921–1930	
Ribbon bar image refer to adjacent text	Efficiency Medal	—		1930–1999	
Ribbon bar image refer to adjacent text	Army Emergency Reserve Efficiency Medal	—	1953	1953–1967	
Ribbon bar image refer to adjacent text	Efficiency Medal (Territorial & Volunteer Reserve)	—		1930–1999	
Ribbon bar image refer to adjacent text	Efficiency Medal (HAC)	—		1930–1999	
	Special Reserve Long Service and Good Conduct Medal	—	1908	1908–1930	
	Decoration for Officers of the Royal Naval Reserve	RD		1908–1999	
	Decoration for Officers of the Royal Naval Volunteer Reserve	VRD			
	Royal Naval Reserve Long Service and Good Conduct Medal	—			
	Royal Naval Volunteer Reserve Long Service and Good Conduct Medal	—			
	Royal Naval Auxiliary Sick Berth Reserve Long Service and Good Conduct Medal	—			
	Royal Fleet Reserve Long Service and Good Conduct Medal	—			
	Royal Naval Wireless Auxiliary Reserve Long Service and Good Conduct Medal	—			
	Royal Naval Auxiliary Service Long Service Medal	—			
Ribbon bar image refer to adjacent text	Air Efficiency Award	AE		1942–1999	Only award to officers entitles use of postnominal.
	Volunteer Reserves Service Medal	VR		1999 – present	
Ribbon bar image refer to adjacent text	Volunteer Reserves Service Medal (HAC)	VR		1999 – present	
	Ulster Defence Regiment Medal	UD			Only award to officers entitles use of postnominal.
	Northern Ireland Home Service Medal	—			
Marksmanship
Ribbon bar image refer to adjacent text	Queen's Medal for Champion Shots of the Royal Navy and Royal Marines	—	1966	1966 – present	
Ribbon bar image refer to adjacent text	Queen's Medal for Champion Shots of the New Zealand Naval Forces	—	1958	1955 – present	
Ribbon bar image refer to adjacent text	Queen's Medal for Champion Shots in the Military Forces	—	1869	1870–82; 1923 – present	
Ribbon bar image refer to adjacent text	Queen's Medal for Champion Shots of the Air Forces	—	1953	1953 – present	
Part Time Forces Long Service (resumed)
Ribbon bar image refer to adjacent text	Cadet Forces Medal	—	February 1950	1950 – present	
	Coastguard Auxiliary Service Long Service Medal	—			
	Special Constabulary Long Service Medal	—			
Ribbon bar image refer to adjacent text	Canadian Forces' Decoration	CD		1949 – present	
Ribbon bar image refer to adjacent text	Royal Observer Corps Medal	—	1950	1941–1995	
	Civil Defence Long Service Medal	—			
	Ambulance Service (Emergency Duties) Long Service and Good Conduct Medal	—			
	Royal Fleet Auxiliary Service Medal	—			
Voluntary Service Medals
	Women's Royal Voluntary Service Medal	—	1961	1961 – present	
Ribbon bar image refer to adjacent text	South African Medal for War Services	—	1945	1939–1946	

=== National independence medals ===
Emblem	Description	Estab.	Eligibility Period	Remarks
Ribbon bar image refer to adjacent text	Union of South Africa Commemoration Medal	1910		
	Indian Independence Medal	1947		
	Pakistan Medal	1949		
Ribbon bar image refer to adjacent text	Ceylon Armed Services Inauguration Medal	1955	1949–51	
	Sierra Leone Independence Medal	1961		
Ribbon bar image refer to adjacent text	Jamaica Independence Medal	1962		
	Nigerian Independence Medal	1960		
	Uganda Independence Medal	1962		
	Malawi Independence Medal	1964		
Ribbon bar image refer to adjacent text	Fiji Independence Medal	1970		
Ribbon bar image refer to adjacent text	Papua New Guinea Independence Medal	1975		
	Solomon Islands Independence Medal	1978		

== Foreign and international ==
=== International campaign medals ===
Worn with other United Kingdom campaign medals in order of date of issue (except where noted otherwise).

Emblem	Description	Eligibility Period	Remarks
Ribbon bar image refer to adjacent text	United Nations Service Medal for Korea	27 June 1950 – 27 July 1955	Established 12 December 1950
Ribbon bar image refer to adjacent text	United Nations Service Medal for ONUC	10 July 1960 – 30 June 1964	
Ribbon bar image refer to adjacent text	United Nations Service Medal for UNFICYP	27 March 1964 – present	
Ribbon bar image refer to adjacent text	United Nations Service Medal for UNTAG	1 April 1989 – 31 March 1990	
Ribbon bar image refer to adjacent text	United Nations Special Service Medal	1989–1990; 3 July 1992 – 12 January 1996; April 1991 – present	For: Peshawar UNOCHA; Sarajevo Airlift; Iraq UNSCOM
Ribbon bar image refer to adjacent text	United Nations Service Medal for UNIKOM	1 April 1991 – 6 October 2003	
Ribbon bar image refer to adjacent text	United Nations Service Medal for MINURSO	1 April 1991 – present	
Ribbon bar image refer to adjacent text	European Community Monitor Mission Medal	25 July 1991 – 30 June 1992	For service in the Former Yugoslavia.
Ribbon bar image refer to adjacent text	United Nations Service Medal for UNAMIC	1 October 1991 – 31 March 1992	
Ribbon bar image refer to adjacent text	United Nations Service Medal for UNPROFOR	1 March 1992 – 31 December 1995	
Ribbon bar image refer to adjacent text	United Nations Service Medal for UNTAC	1 April 1992 – 30 September 1993	
	NATO Former Republic of Yugoslavia Medal	1 July 1992 – 31 December 2002	Issued with clasp Former Yugoslavia.
Ribbon bar image refer to adjacent text	Western European Union Mission Service Medal	1 July 1992 – 31 December 1996	For Service in the Former Yugoslavia.
Ribbon bar image refer to adjacent text	United Nations Service Medal for UNOMIG	23 August 1993 – present	
Ribbon bar image refer to adjacent text	United Nations Service Medal for UNAMIR	1 October 1993 – 31 March 1996	
Ribbon bar image refer to adjacent text	United Nations Service Medal for UNAVEM III	1 February 1995 – 1 June 1997	
Ribbon bar image refer to adjacent text	United Nations Service Medal for UNTAES	January 1996 – January 1998	
Ribbon bar image refer to adjacent text	United Nations Service Medal for UNOMSIL	1 June 1998 – 30 September 1999	
Ribbon bar image refer to adjacent text	NATO Kosovo Medal	13 October 1998 – 31 December 2002	Issued with clasp Kosovo.
Ribbon bar image refer to adjacent text	United Nations Service Medal for UNAMET	7 June 1999 – 24 October 1999	
Ribbon bar image refer to adjacent text	United Nations Service Medal for UNMIK	10 June 1999 – present	
Ribbon bar image refer to adjacent text	United Nations Service Medal for UNAMSIL	1 October 1999 – present	
Ribbon bar image refer to adjacent text	United Nations Service Medal for UNTAET	25 October 1999 – present	
Ribbon bar image refer to adjacent text	United Nations Service Medal for MONUC	30 November 1999 – present	
Ribbon bar image refer to adjacent text	United Nations Service Medal for UNMEE	15 September 2000 – present	
	NATO Macedonia Medal	1 June 2001 – 31 December 2002	
Ribbon bar image refer to adjacent text	NATO Non-Article 5 Medal for the Balkans	1 January 2003 – 20 December 2004; 1 January 2003 – 29 March 2010; 1 January 2003 – 31 March 2003	Issued with clasp Non Article 5 for: Balkans; Kosovo; Macedonia
Ribbon bar image refer to adjacent text	NATO Non-Article 5 medal for the Balkans	29 March 2010 – present	
Ribbon bar image refer to adjacent text	European Security and Defence Policy Service Medal – Op Althea	2 December 2004 – present	Issued with clasp Althea.
Ribbon bar image refer to adjacent text	NATO Non-Article 5 Medal for Operation Unified Protector	23 March 2011 – 31 October 2011	Issued with clasp OUP-LIBYA/LIBYE.
Ribbon bar image refer to adjacent text	Common Security and Defence Policy Service Medal – EUFOR RCA	30 June 2014 – 30 May 2015	Issued with clasp EUFOR RCA.
	Multinational Force and Observers Medal	March 1982 – present	First awarded in 2017; retrospective for service from 1982 onwards Silver numerals on ribbon indicate additional periods of service
	United Nations Service medal for UNMISS	2011 – present	
Ribbon bar image refer to adjacent text	NATO Meritorious Service Medal	2003 – present	Issued with clasp Meritorious.

=== Commonwealth orders ===
Worn after all United Kingdom awards (including international awards treated as United Kingdom awards). Honorary awards are worn before substantive awards.

=== Commonwealth decorations ===
Worn after all Commonwealth orders.

=== Commonwealth campaign and commemorative medals ===
Worn after all Commonwealth decorations.

Emblem	Description	Established	Eligibility Period	Remarks
	Brunei General Service Medal		12 August 1966 – present	Sultanate of Brunei. Seconded forces only.
	Malaya Active Service Medal		31 August 1957 – 15 September 1963	Malaysia. Seconded forces only.
Ribbon bar image refer to adjacent text	Pingat Jasa Malaysia	Malaysia 2004	31 August 1957 – 31 December 1966	Permission to wear as at 6 November 2011.
Ribbon bar image refer to adjacent text	Kenya Campaign Medal		12 December 1963 – 30 November 1967	Kenya. Seconded forces only.
Ribbon bar image refer to adjacent text	Campaign Medal	1959	23 May 1965 – 30 September 1976	Oman. Seconded forces only. Referred to in JSP761 as Muscat/Oman Dhofar Campaign Medal.
Ribbon bar image refer to adjacent text	Malaysia General Service Medal		11 August 1966 – 31 December 1989	Malaysia. Seconded forces only.
Ribbon bar image refer to adjacent text	Unitas Medal		1 June 1994 – 26 April 2003	Republic of South Africa. BMATT personnel only.
Ribbon bar image refer to adjacent text	International Force East Timor Medal	25 March 2000	16 September 1999 – 10 April 2000	Australia
Ribbon bar image refer to adjacent text	Malta George Cross Fiftieth Anniversary Medal	1992	10 June 1940 – 8 September 1943	Malta. Not able to be worn whilst in Crown Service

=== Foreign orders ===
Worn after all Commonwealth awards.

Emblem	Description	Established	Eligibility Period	Remarks
alt	Imperial Order of the Crescent	1799	1799–1801	Ottoman Empire. Knight First Class and Knight Second Class. Awarded to senior British officers during the Napoleonic wars.
Ribbon bar image refer to adjacent text	Chevalier Légion d'Honneur	19 May 1802	1914–1918; 1944	France. Awarded to surviving United Kingdom citizens who participated on French soil in the Great War (1914–18), or in the French liberation campaigns (1944).

=== Foreign decorations ===
Worn after all foreign orders.

=== Foreign campaign and commemorative medals ===
Worn after all foreign decorations.

Emblem	Description	Established	Eligibility Period	Remarks
	Turkish Crimea Medal	21 February 1856	1854–1856	Ottoman Empire
	Khedive's Star		1882–1891	Khedivate of Egypt. Bronze star. Issued to all who were awarded the Egypt Medal.
	Khedive's Sudan Medal (1897)		1896–1899	Khedivate of Egypt.
	Khedive's Sudan Medal (1910)		1910	Khedivate of Egypt.
Ribbon bar image refer to adjacent text	General Service Medal	1963	23 May 1965 – 30 June 1976	Sultanate of Oman. Issued with clasp Dhofar where applicable. Seconded forces only.
	The Accession Medal	1970	23 July 1970	Sultanate of Oman. Seconded forces only.
	The Peace Medal	1979	1 July 1976 – 17 November 1985	Sultanate of Oman. Seconded forces only.
Ribbon bar image refer to adjacent text	Endurance Medal (Al-Sumood)	1976	23 May 1965 – 2 December 1975	Seconded forces only. Referred to in JSP761 as the 'Muscat Victory Medal (As Sumood)'.
	Medal for the 40th Anniversary of Victory in the Great Patriotic War	1985	1941–1945	USSR. For Arctic convoy service. Also known as the Russian Convoy Medal 1941–1945 40th Anniversary Medal.
Ribbon bar image refer to adjacent text	30th Renaissance Medal	2000	18 November 2000	Sultanate of Oman. Seconded forces only.
Ribbon bar image refer to adjacent text	35th Renaissance Medal	2005	18 November 2005	Sultanate of Oman. Seconded forces only.
	40th Renaissance Medal	2010	18 November 2010	Sultanate of Oman. Seconded forces only.
	45th Renaissance Medal	2015	18 November 2015	Sultanate of Oman. Seconded forces only.

=== Campaign medals authorised for acceptance but not for official wear ===
Official permission has been granted for these medals to be accepted, but they are not authorised for wear.

Emblem	Description	Eligibility Period	Remarks
Ribbon bar image refer to adjacent text	Kuwait Liberation Medal	17 January 1991 – 28 February 1991	Saudi Arabia Established 1991
Ribbon bar image refer to adjacent text	Kuwait Liberation Medal	2 August 1990 – 31 August 1993	Kuwait Established 1994
Ribbon bar image refer to adjacent text	NATO Article 5 Medal for Service on Op ACTIVE ENDEAVOUR	26 October 2001 – present	Issued with clasp Article 5.
Ribbon bar image refer to adjacent text	NATO Article 5 Medal for Service on Op EAGLE ASSIST	16 May 2002 – present	Issued with clasp Article 5.
Ribbon bar image refer to adjacent text	European Security and Defence Policy Service Medal – Op Artemis	14 June 2003 – 10 December 2003	Issued with clasp Artemis for service in the Congo.
Ribbon bar image refer to adjacent text	Common Security and Defence Policy Service Medal – Op Atalanta	8 December 2008 – present	Issued with clasp EUNAVFOR ATALANTA for service in counter-piracy operations.

=== Campaign medals not authorised for acceptance or official wear ===
Official permission has been refused for these medals to be accepted and they are not authorised for wear.

Emblem	Description	Eligibility Period	Remarks
Ribbon bar image refer to adjacent text	NATO Non-Article 5 Medal for Pakistan Earthquake Service	8 October 2005 – 1 February 2006	Issued with clasp Pakistan.
Ribbon bar image refer to adjacent text	NATO Non-Article 5 Medal for Service with ISAF	1 June 2003 – present	Issued with clasp ISAF.
Ribbon bar image refer to adjacent text	NATO Non-Article 5 Medal for NATO Training Mission (Iraq)	18 August 2004 – present	Issued with clasp NTM-Iraq.
Ribbon bar image refer to adjacent text	NATO Non-Article 5 Medal for AMIS	13 July 2005 – present	Issued with clasp AMIS.

== Devices ==
Emblem	Description	Remarks
Image of silver rosette used on ribbon bars	Rosette	Represents the award of a bar to a decoration, or service in a specified zone of the area of operations when used on a campaign medal. They are worn when the ribbon only is worn. For selected campaign medals, they are also worn on the riband of the campaign medal (when worn with full or miniature medals) to indicate service in a specified zone.
Image of silver oak leaves used on ribbon bars	Crossed silver oakleaves	From 14 January 1958, any individual made a member of the Order of the British Empire for gallantry (in the grades of Commander, Officer, Member), or awarded the British Empire Medal for gallantry, could wear an emblem of two crossed silver oak leaves on the same riband, ribbon or bow as the badge.
	Medal bar	A bar is worn on the riband of a decoration (when worn with full or miniature medals) to denote each additional award of the decoration. Bars are positioned with even spacing between the top and the bottom of the ribbon.
	Medal clasp	Worn on the riband of campaign medals (when worn with full or miniature medals) to denote the particular campaign, battle, or region the recipient operated in to receive the award. Clasps are positioned at the bottom of the ribbon with successive clasps placed adjacent to each other (with a small gap). The earliest earned clasp is positioned at the bottom whilst the most recent is placed at the top.

== See also ==
- Orders, decorations, and medals of the United Kingdom
- British campaign medals
- List of military decorations
- State decoration
