= Orders, decorations, and medals of British India =

Awards related to British India

With the inception of Company rule in India by the East India Company in 1757, the tradition of giving medals also began. Campaign medals and awards were given to soldiers who fought in the Company's presidency armies (Bengal Army of Bengal Presidency, Madras Army of Madras Presidency and Bombay Army of Bombay Presidency). After 1895, with the formation of British Indian Army, soldiers were awarded with gallantry awards alongside Imperial Service Troops of the princely states. Awards were also bestowed upon the personnel of Royal Indian Navy and of Royal Indian Air Force with its incorporation in 1932. Indian Imperial Police were also eligible for the police honours.
The Company's powers were removed in 1858 after the Indian Mutiny, and the British Crown assumed direct control of India and the monarch took the title of Emperor of India in 1876. The Imperial Crown of India was made in 1911 for the Delhi Durbar to mark the accession of the Emperor. During the British Raj, new medals and orders were established and were awarded for the services to the Crown and the Indian Empire by Europeans and Indians of British India and the princely states. After 1914, Indians also became eligible for British Honours. The following is a list of orders, decorations and medals related to British in India:

== Orders ==
=== Orders of chivalry ===
- Order of the Star of India (1861–1947)
- Order of the Indian Empire (1878–1947)
- Order of the Crown of India (1878–1947)

=== Order of merit ===
- Order of British India (1837–1947)

== Medals ==
=== Civil medals ===
- Kaisar-i-Hind Medal (1900–1947)

=== Military medals ===
- Indian Order of Merit (1837–1947)
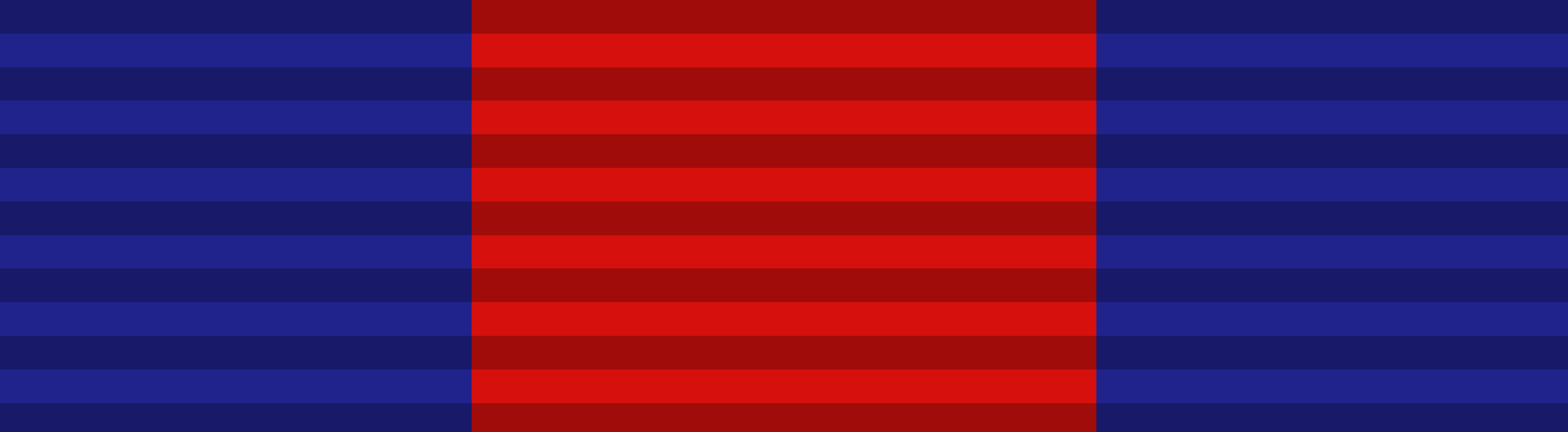
- Indian Distinguished Service Medal (1907–1947)

=== Service medals ===
- Indian Long Service and Good Conduct Medal (for Europeans of Indian Army) (1848–1873)
- Indian Meritorious Service Medal (for Europeans of Indian Army) (1848–1873)
- Indian Long Service and Good Conduct Medal (for Indian Army) (1848–1873)
- Indian Meritorious Service Medal (for Indian Army) (1888–1947)
- Volunteer Officers' Decoration for India and the Colonies (1894–1899)
- Volunteer Long Service Medal for India and the Colonies (1896–1930)

=== Police medals ===
- Indian Police Medal (1932–1950)

=== Commemoration medals ===
- Empress of India Medal (1877)
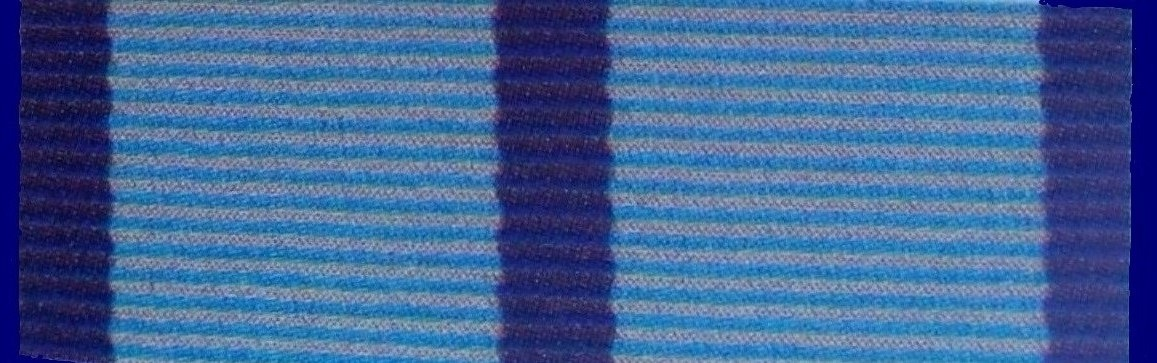
- Delhi Durbar Medal (1903)
- Delhi Durbar Medal (1911)

=== Campaign medals ===
- Monghyr Mutiny Medal (1766)
- Deccan Medal (1784)
- Mysore Medal (1793)
- Egypt Medal (1801)
- Seringapatam Medal (1801)
- Capture of Ceylon Medal (1807)
- Medal for capture of Rodrigues, Isle of Bourbon and Isle of France (1811)
- Java Medal (1812)
- Nepal Medal (1816)
- Burma Medal (1826)
- Coorg Medal (1837)
- Ghuznee Medal (1839)
- Jellalabad Medals (1842)
- Medal for the Defence of Kelat-I-Ghilzie (1842)
- Candahar, Ghuznee, Cabul Medal (1842)
- China War Medal (1842)
- Scinde Medal (1843)
- Gwalior Star (1844)
- Sutlej Medal (1846)
- Punjab Medal (1849)
- Army of India Medal (1851)
- India General Service Medal (1854)
- Indian Mutiny Medal (1858)
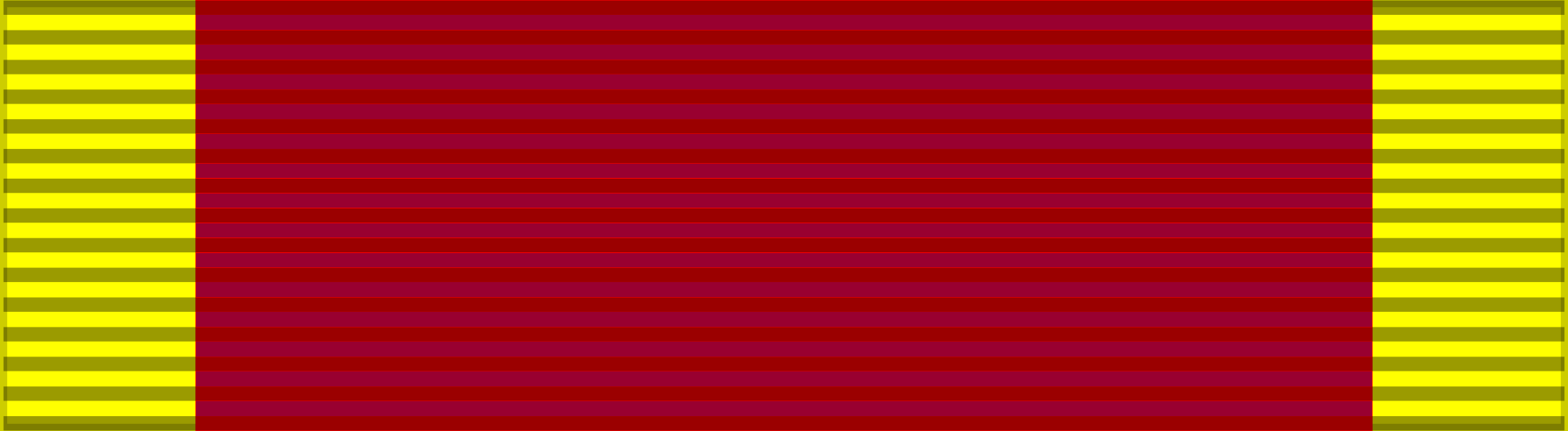
- Second China War Medal (1861)
- Abyssinian War Medal (1869)
- Afghanistan Medal (United Kingdom) (1881)
- Kabul to Kandahar Star (1881)
- Central Africa Medal (1895)
- India Medal (1896)
- East and Central Africa Medal (1899)
- China War Medal (1900)
- Tibet Medal (1905)
- India General Service Medal (1909)
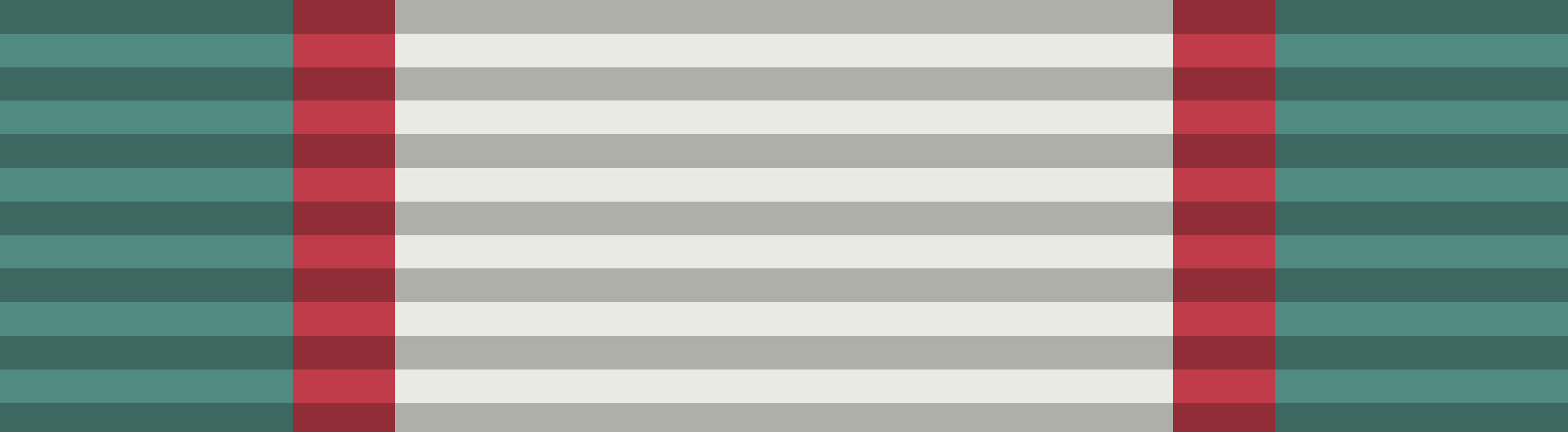
- India General Service Medal (1936)
- India Service Medal (1946)

== Battle honours ==
- Mysore (1789–91)
- Egypt (battle honour) (1801)
- Assaye (battle honour) (1803)
- Abyssinia (battle honour) (1868)

== Titles ==
- Title Badge (India)

=== First class ===
- Nawab Bahadur / Sardar Bahadur
- Diwan Bahadur

=== Second class ===
- Khan Bahadur
- Rai Bahadur / Rao Bahadur

=== Third class ===
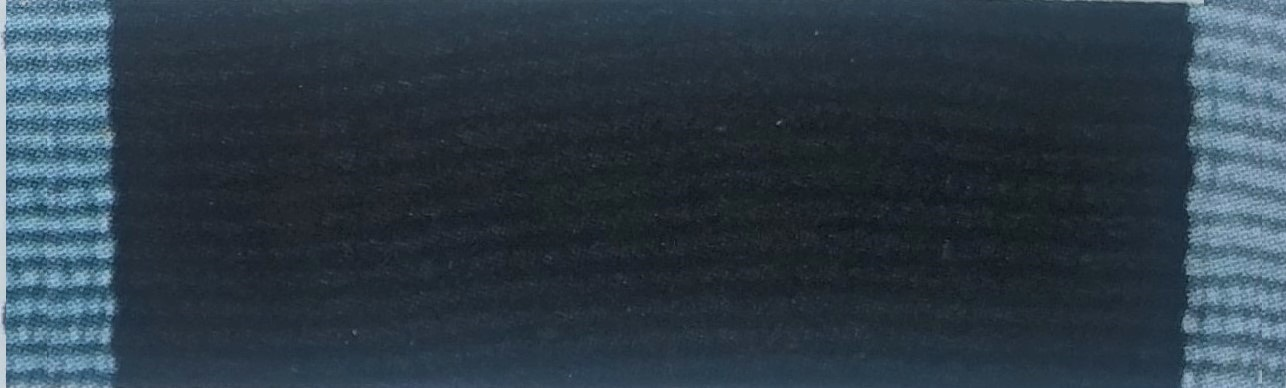
- Khan Sahib / Sardar Sahib
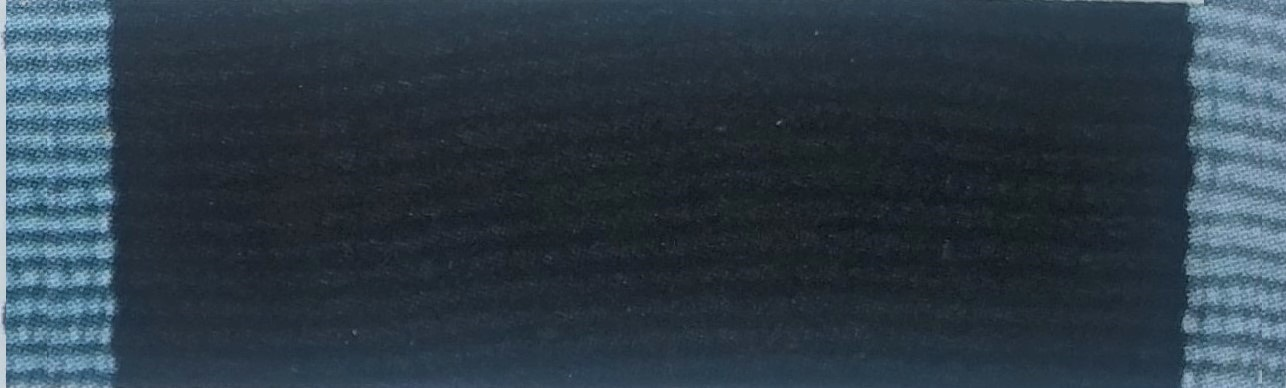
- Rai Sahib / Rao Sahib

== See also ==
- Orders, decorations, and medals of the United Kingdom
