= British campaign medals =

Medals awarded to people who served in a particular British military campaign

British campaign medals are decorations awarded to members of the British Armed Forces, Allied forces and civilians participating in specified military campaigns. Examples include the Defence Medal, for homeland defence in World War II, and the Atlantic Star for World War II sea service in the Atlantic.

== 18th century ==
- Naval Gold Medal (1794)

== 19th century ==
- Army Gold Cross (1810)
- Army Gold Medal (1810)
- Waterloo Medal (1815)
- Ghuznee Medal (1839)
- Candahar, Ghuznee, Cabul Medal (1842)
- Jellalabad Medals (1842)
- Medal for the Defence of Kelat-I-Ghilzie (1842)
- China War Medal (1842)
- Scinde Medal (1843)
- Gwalior Star (1843)
- Sutlej Medal (1846)
- Naval General Service Medal (1847)
- Military General Service Medal (1847)
- Punjab Medal (1849)
- Army of India Medal (1851)
- India General Service Medal (1854)
- South Africa Medal (1854)
- Crimean War Medal (1854)
- Baltic Medal (1856)
- Indian Mutiny Medal (1858)
- Second China War Medal (1861)
- New Zealand War Medal (1869)
- Abyssinian War Medal (1869)
- Canada General Service Medal (1866–70)
- Ashantee Medal (1873–74)
- South Africa Medal (1880) (1877–1879)
- Afghanistan Medal (1878–1880)
- Kabul to Kandahar Star (1880)
- Egypt Medal (1882–1889)
- Royal Niger Company’s Medal (1886–1897)
- British South Africa Company Medal (1890–1897)
- East and West Africa Medal (1892)
- Central Africa Medal (1895)
- India Medal (1896)
- Ashanti Star (1896)
- Queen's Sudan Medal (1899)
- East and Central Africa Medal (1899)
- Queen's South Africa Medal (1899)
- Queen's Mediterranean Medal (1899) (South African War)

== 20th century ==
=== Pre–World War I ===
- China War Medal (1900)
- Ashanti Medal (1901)
- King's South Africa Medal (1902)
- Africa General Service Medal (1902)
- Transport Medal (1902) (for South Africa or China)
- Tibet Medal (1905)
- Natal Native Rebellion Medal (1906)
- India General Service Medal (1909)

=== World War I ===
During World War I (1914–1918) the following campaign medals were issued:

- 1914 Star
- 1914–15 Star
- British War Medal
- Mercantile Marine War Medal
- Victory Medal
- Territorial Force War Medal

The most frequent combinations are "trios" of either the 1914 or 1914–15 Star, the British War Medal and Victory Medal; and "pairs" of the British War and Victory Medals, these generally for servicemen who joined the war after 1915.
A Memorial Plaque was issued to the next-of-kin of deceased service personnel.

=== Inter World War ===
- General Service Medal (1918)
- Naval General Service Medal (1915)
- India General Service Medal (1936)

=== World War II ===
During World War II (1939–1945) the following were issued (with authorised Clasp or Emblem (if awarded) in brackets)—the first eleven are listed in the authorised Order of Wearing:

- 1939–1945 Star (Battle of Britain or Bomber Command)
- Atlantic Star (Air Crew Europe or France and Germany)
- Arctic Star
- Air Crew Europe Star (Atlantic or France and Germany)
- Africa Star (8th Army or 1st Army or North Africa 1942–43)
- Pacific Star (Pacific)
- Burma Star (Burma)
- Italy Star
- France and Germany Star (Atlantic)
- Defence Medal (Silver laurel leaves (King's Commendation for brave conduct; civil))
- Canadian Volunteer Service Medal (Overseas or Dieppe or Hong Kong or Bomber Command)
- Newfoundland Volunteer War Service Medal
- War Medal 1939–1945 (Oak leaf)
- Africa Service Medal
- India Service Medal
- New Zealand War Service Medal
- Southern Rhodesia Medal for War Service
- Australia Service Medal

=== Post–World War II ===
- Korea Medal (1951)
- Nuclear Test Medal (1952–1967)
- General Service Medal (1962)
- Rhodesia Medal (1980)
- South Atlantic Medal (1982)
- Gulf Medal (1991)

== 21st century ==
- Operational Service Medal for Sierra Leone (2000)
- Operational Service Medal for Afghanistan (2002–2021)
- Operational Service Medal for the Democratic Republic of Congo (2003)
- Iraq Medal (2004–2011)
- Iraq Reconstruction Service Medal (2004–2013)
- Civilian Service Medal (Afghanistan) (2011–present)
- Ebola Medal for Service in West Africa (2014–2016)
- General Service Medal (2008) (2009–present)
- Operational Service Medal for Iraq and Syria (2016–present)
- Humanitarian Medal (2023–present)
- Wider Service Medal (2024–present)

== See also ==
- Orders, decorations, and medals of the United Kingdom
- Military awards and decorations of the United Kingdom
- Campaign medal
- NATO Medal
- Australian campaign medals
- Canadian campaign medals
- New Zealand campaign medals
