= Seringapatam Medal =

East India Company medal for 1799 Battle of Seringapatam during Mysore Wars

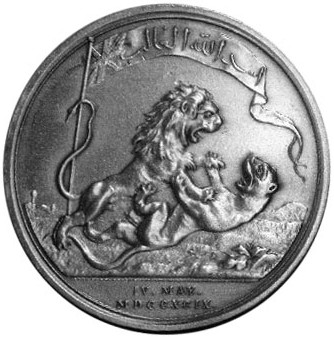
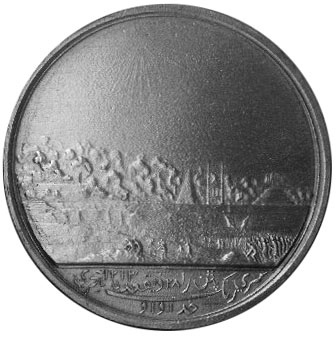
- Obverse and reverse of a silver Seringapatam medal
- Type: Campaign medal
- Awarded for: Participation in the Battle of Seringapatam, April–May 1799
- Presented by: Honourable East India Company (HEIC)
- Campaign: Part of Fourth Anglo-Mysore War
- Established: 1801

Highlights
- Total: About 54,000: 113 gold 185 silver gilt 3,636 silver 5,000 bronzed 45,000 tin.
- Ribbon of the medal

The Seringapatam Medal, or Sri Ranga Pattanam Medal, is a campaign medal that was awarded by the Governor-General of India to all British and Indian soldiers who participated in the British victory in the Battle of Seringapatam in 1799.

== Criteria ==
The 1799 siege and capture of Seringapatam, the capital of Mysore, was the culmination of the Fourth Anglo-Mysore War. It resulted in the death in battle of Tipu Sultan of Mysore, with Mysore becoming a princely state within British India.

The Seringapatam Medal was commissioned by the Honourable East India Company (HEIC) in 1801 to reward all ranks of both the British and Indian armies who contributed to the British victory, including those who set out for the campaign but did not finally take part. This was the first HEIC campaign medal awarded to both Indian and British troops on the same basis. Those eligible included the Swiss mercenary unit, the Regiment de Meuron.

The original medal was minted in England in 1801–2, but only sent out to India in 1808, for distribution to dignitaries and to troops from the presidencies of Bombay and Madras. This issue was presented in various metals determined by the rank and status of the participant: in gold to the highest-ranking commanders, Indian princes and other dignitaries; in silver-gilt to intermediate officers including majors and senior HEIC officials; in silver to more junior officers; in bronze to native commissioned and senior non–commissioned officers and to European sergeants and equivalent; and in tin/pewter to corporals and other ranks, both British and Indian.
A second issue of the medal was struck in Calcutta, India in 1808 for award to troops of the Bengal Presidency. The Presidency, apparently unaware of the original award criteria, followed the precedent set by the earlier HEIC campaign medals for the Deccan and Mysore and awarded medals in gold to native officers and in silver to native non–commissioned officers and other ranks.

Although commonly worn in uniform, formal permission to wear the medal was only granted to officers in HEIC service in 1815, and to members of the British Army in 1851, upon the decision not to grant a separate Seringapatam clasp to the newly instituted Army of India Medal.

In addition to the medals, those present received prize money, varying from £100,000 for General Harris, the Commander-in-Chief, and £10,000 to other general officers to £7 for each private soldier.

== Description ==
The medal, designed by Conrad Heinrich Küchler, had the following design:
The obverse shows the British lion trampling a tiger, Sultan Tipu's emblem, with a pennant above bearing the Arabic caption Asad Allah al-Ghalib (Arabic: أسـد الله الـغـالـب), which translates as The Victorious Lion of God. Below is the date of the fort's capture: IV MAY MDCCXCIX.
The reverse displays the storming of Seringapatam Fort with, above, the sun at its zenith. Below is an inscription in Persian Seringapatam, God given 28 day of the month zikadah, in the Hijri year 1213.
It was issued unnamed, although some recipients had their details engraved on the medal.

The original medals, with a diameter of 1.9 inches (48 mm), were manufactured at the Soho Mint in Birmingham, England in 1801–2. Additional gold and silver medals were produced by the Calcutta Mint in 1808. These were of poorer workmanship and are slightly smaller, with a diameter of 1.8 inches (46 mm) and slightly thinner.

The Soho Mint medals were awarded without any means of suspension for wear, with recipients arranging their own, which included both ring and bar suspenders. The Calcutta Mint medals were issued mounted with a flattened loop for suspension. Although there was no formal regulation, the medal was usually worn on the left chest from a watered pale orange ribbon, with the shading representing the stripes of a tiger, Tipu's emblem. However, British officers frequently adopted the blue edged red ribbon used for the Army Gold Medal, and worn around the neck by general officers and on the left chest by more junior officers. Some native Indian soldiers wore the medal around the neck from a yellow cord, as was the practice for other HEIC medals.

While no clasps were authorised, some officers added an unofficial clasp bearing the word Seringapatam.

== Number awarded ==
In total, about 53,934 medals were awarded:

Maker	Gold medals	Gilt medals	Silver medals	Bronze medals	Pewter medals
Soho Mint, Birmingham	30	185	850	5,000	45,000
Calcutta Mint	83	–	2,786	–	–
Total	113	185	3,636	5,000	45,000

== See also ==
- Anglo-Mysore Wars
- Fourth Anglo-Mysore War
- Tipu Sultan
- Tipu's Tiger
