= Asadullah al-ghalib =

Asadullah al-ghalib means "the (triumphant) lion of god", it has been used as a personal epithet.

== People ==
- Ali (600–661), cousin and son-in-law of Mohammed, first Shia imam
- Muhammad Asadullah Al-Ghalib (1948–), Bangladeshi reformist Islamic scholar
- Asadulla Al Galib (1998–), Bangladeshi cricketer

== Other ==
- A personification of Britain on the Seringapatam Medal
