= Medal for capture of Rodrigues, Isle of Bourbon and Isle of France =

East India Company medal for capture of French Indian Ocean islands, 1809-10

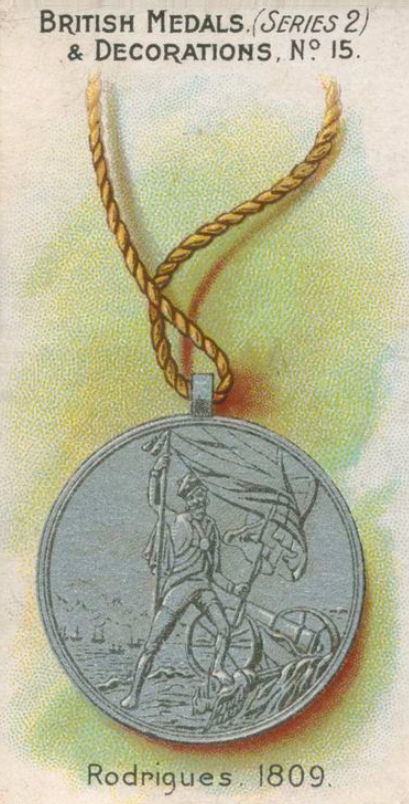
- Obverse of the medal depicted on a cigarette card
- Type: Campaign medal
- Awarded for: Campaign service
- Presented by: the East India Company (EIC)
- Eligibility: EIC forces
- Campaign(s): Capture of islands of Rodrigues, Bourbon and Mauritius, 1809–10
- Clasps: None
- Established: September 1811
- Total: 45 gold and 2,156 silver medals
- Suspension cord for the medal

The Medal for the capture of Rodrigues, Isle of Bourbon and Isle of France is a campaign medal that was awarded by the Governor-General of India to native Indian soldiers of the East India Company (EIC), who took part in the capture of these three Indian Ocean islands from French forces between July 1809 and December 1810.

== Criteria ==
During the Napoleonic Wars, the French used their Indian Ocean territories to raid British convoys sailing between Britain and India. In response the British, in operations involving the Royal Navy and the armies of the United Kingdom and the East India Company, invaded and captured the principal French islands. These actions included the invasion of Rodrigues in July 1809; the invasion of Isle Bonaparte in July 1810 and the invasion of Isle de France in November 1810. Rodrigues was the smallest operation, with only 200 EIC troops present, with the Isle de France by far the largest, involving 10,000 British and Indian forces.

The medal, for award to native Indian troops only, was authorised in September 1811 by Lord Minto, the Governor-General of India, with the medals completed and distributed in 1813. While Regiments from all three Indian Presidencies took part, only the Bengal army finally awarded the medal, with the Bombay and Madras armies not taking up the proposal. A total of 2,201 medals were issued, with native Indian officers awarded the medal in gold (45 awarded) and other ranks receiving silver medals (2,156 awarded).

Europeans, including those serving with the EIC, the British Army and the Royal Navy, were not eligible for the medal. When the Military and Naval General Service Medals were established in 1847 to reward British veterans of the Napoleonic Wars, participants of the Indian Ocean campaigns were not among those authorised to receive the new medal.

== Description ==
The medals were struck at the Calcutta Mint in gold and in silver. Both types were 1.9 inches (48 mm) in diameter and had the following design:
The obverse depicts a sepoy standing in front of a field gun, holding a Union Jack in his right hand and a musket with fixed bayonet in his left. His foot tramples the French colours and Imperial Eagle. The British fleet is at anchor is in the background. There is no inscription.
The reverse has a Persian inscription within a wreath, translating as: This medal was conferred in commemoration of the bravery and accustomed fidelity exhibited by the Sepoys of the English Company in the capture of the Mauritius Islands in the Hijri year 1226. Around the edge, outside the wreath, is the English wording: RODRIGUES VI JULY MDCCCIX. BOURBON VIII JULY & ISLE OF FRANCE III DEC. MDCCCX.
The medal was issued unnamed.
The suspension is a flattened loop, pinned at the base, through which passes a yellow suspension cord allowing the medal to be worn around the neck.
