= Egypt Medal (1801) =

East India Company medal for 1801 Egyptian campaign

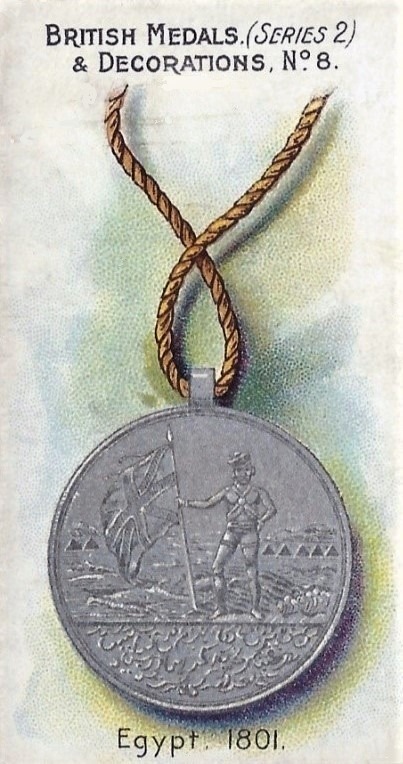
- Obverse of the medal depicted on a cigarette card
- Type: Campaign medal
- Awarded for: Campaign service
- Presented by: the East India Company (EIC)
- Eligibility: EIC and British forces
- Campaign: Egypt, 1801
- Established: 1802 (distributed from 1811)
- Total: 16 gold and 2,200 silver medals
- Suspension cord for the medal

The Egypt Medal is a campaign medal that was awarded by the Governor-General of India to members of the expeditionary force that travelled from India to take part in the 1801 Egyptian campaign, a part of the French Revolutionary Wars.

== Criteria ==
The medal was awarded to the soldiers of the Major General Baird's division, comprising both East India Company (EIC) and British Army units, that sailed from Bombay to Egypt in March 1801 to take part in the campaign against the French. After being present at the successful sieges of Cairo in June, and Alexandria in August and September, the division returned to India in early 1802.

The medal was authorised in July 1802 by Marquess Wellesley, the Governor-General of India, although the medals were only finally completed and distributed from 1811. Troops from Bengal received the medal in gold for more senior officers (16 awarded) and in silver for other ranks (760 awarded), while all members of the Bombay contingent were issued with silver medals (1,439 awarded).

Only those who sailed from India with General Baird's division were entitled to the medal, including those who did not reach Egypt. Others, including members of the 61st Foot who joined the division in Egypt, having travelled from the Cape of Good Hope, were ineligible. Surviving British Army and Royal Navy Egypt veterans who had not received the earlier Egypt Medal were however eligible for either the Military or Naval General Service Medal with clasp Egypt when this clasp was authorised in 1850.

== Description ==
The medal was engraved and struck at the Calcutta Mint in gold and in silver. Both types were 1.9 inches (48 mm) in diameter with the following design:
The obverse depicts a sepoy holding a Union Jack with an encampment in the background. Below is the Persian inscription This medal has been presented in commemoration of the defeat of the French armies in the Kingdom of Egypt by the great bravery of the victorious army of England.
The reverse shows a ship of the line under full sail towards the Egyptian coast, with an obelisk and four pyramids in the background. In the exergue is the date MDCCCI (1801).
The medal was issued unnamed.
The suspension is a flattened loop, pinned at the base, through which passes a yellow suspension cord allowing the medal to be worn around the neck.

Specimens in bronze and bronze gilt are later strikings and were not issued.
