= Java Medal =

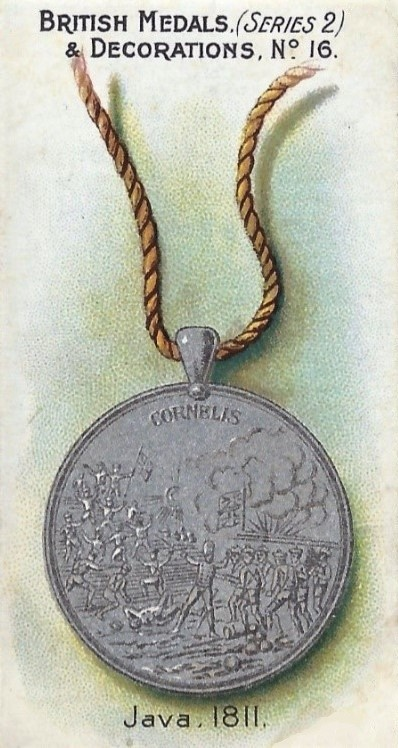
- Obverse of the medal depicted on a cigarette card
- Type: Campaign medal
- Awarded for: Campaign service
- Presented by: the Honourable East India Company (HEIC)
- Eligibility: HEIC forces
- Campaign(s): Java 1811
- Clasps: None
- Established: 1812
- Total: 133 gold and 6,519 silver medals
- Suspension cord for the medal

The Java Medal is a campaign medal awarded by the Governor-General of India to soldiers of the armies of the Honourable East India Company (HEIC) who participated in the Invasion of Java in August and September 1811, during the Napoleonic Wars.

== Criteria ==
The medal was authorised in February 1812 by Lord Minto, the Governor-General of India, who had accompanied the expedition to Java. It was awarded to more senior officers in gold (133 awarded) and other ranks in silver (6,519 awarded). Recipients of the silver medal included both native Indian (5,761 recipients) and European (about 750 recipients) soldiers in HEIC service.

Members of the British Army and Royal Navy present did not receive the medal. Army officers of the rank of Major and above qualified for the Army Gold Medal, while surviving British officers, soldiers and sailors qualified for either the Military or Naval General Service Medal with clasp 'Java', when these medals was established in 1847.

== Description ==
The medal was struck at the Calcutta Mint in gold and in silver. Both types were 1.9 inches (48 mm) in diameter with the following design:
The obverse depicts the storming of Fort Cornelis, which British and HEIC troops captured on 26 August 1811, with the word CORNELIS above.
The reverse has the Persian inscription This medal was conferred in commemoration of the bravery and courage exhibited by the Sepoys of the English Company in the capture of the Kingdom of Java, in the Hijri year 1228 with, around the edge, the English wording JAVA CONQUERED XXVI AUGUST MDCCCXI.
The medal was issued unnamed.
The suspension is a flattened loop, pinned at the base, through which passes a suspension cord allowing the medal to be worn around the neck.

The Hijri year 1228 cited on the medal's reverse commenced on 4 January 1813. This is the year the medals were minted, not the year of the campaign, and appears to be an error.
