= Royal Niger Company's Medal =

Royal Niger Company’s Medal
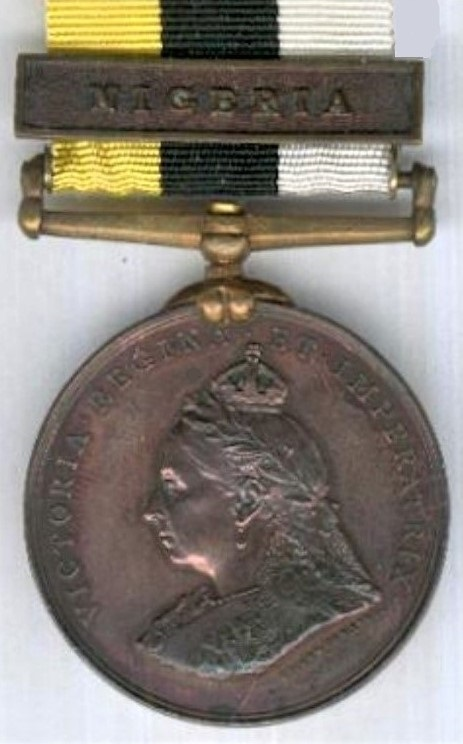
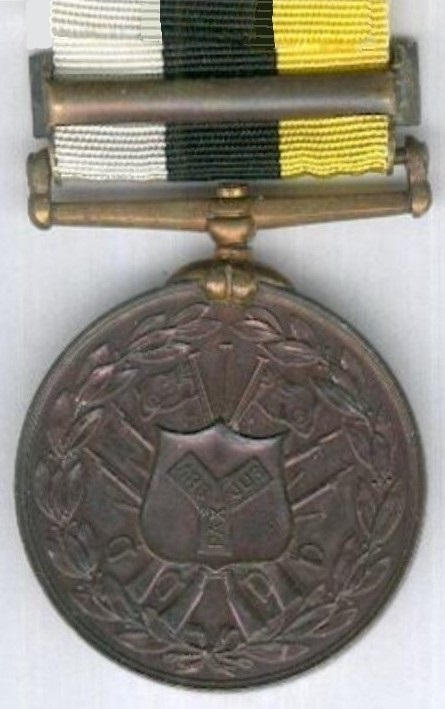
- Obverse and reverse of the bronze medal
- Type: Campaign medal
- Awarded for: Campaign service
- Description: Awarded in silver to Europeans and bronze to natives
- Presented by: the Royal Niger Company, with approval of the British Government
- Eligibility: Royal Niger Company forces and troops seconded from British Army
- Campaign(s): Small expeditions in Nigeria 1886-97
- Established: 1899
- Ribbon: Three equal strips of yellow, black and white

The Royal Niger Company’s Medal was a campaign medal issued in 1899 by the Royal Niger Company for service in minor military operations in Nigeria between 1886 and 1897. The award was approved by the British government and could be worn by British servicemen.

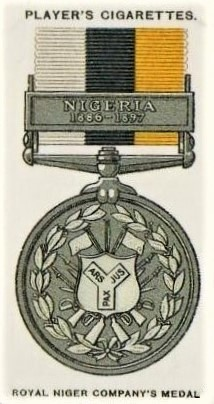
Reverse of the silver medal, showing the clasp

Flag of the Royal Niger Company, showing the Company coat of arms

== Criteria ==
The award covered a series of small punitive expeditions in the company’s territory between 1886 and 1897, with only operations where casualties had occurred qualifying. Those involved were locally recruited troops and constabulary employed by the Royal Niger Company, as well as a small number of British army officers and non commissioned officers seconded to local forces. No British Army units took part. For native forces, only those who were still in service when the medal was issued received the medal.

No further awards were made after the Royal Niger Company had its charter revoked in 1899, with any operation justifying an award covered by other campaign medals, including the East and West Africa Medal and the Africa General Service Medal.

== Appearance ==
The medal is 38 millimetres (1.5 in) in diameter. It was awarded in silver to Europeans (about 100 awarded) and bronze to native Africans. All were issued with a single clasp, inscribed "NIGERIA 1886-1897" on the silver medals and "NIGERIA" on the bronze. Otherwise both were of the same design:
Obverse: a left facing portrait of Queen Victoria, designed by Sir Joseph Boehm with the inscription "VICTORIA REGINA ET IMPERATRIX".
Reverse: the arms of the Royal Niger Company (a shield bearing the words "PAX, JUS, ARS", Latin for peace, justice, skill), with a trophy of arms and flags behind, all surrounded by a laurel wreath.
Naming: Silver medals had the name and rank of the recipient impressed or engraved on the rim. Bronze medals were issued with a number impressed on the rim.

The medal was designed and manufactured by Spink & Son of London.

The 31.7 millimetres (1.25 in) wide ribbon has three equal strips of yellow, black and white, with the yellow to the left when facing the wearer.
