= Deccan Medal =

East India Company medal for native troops, 1778–1784

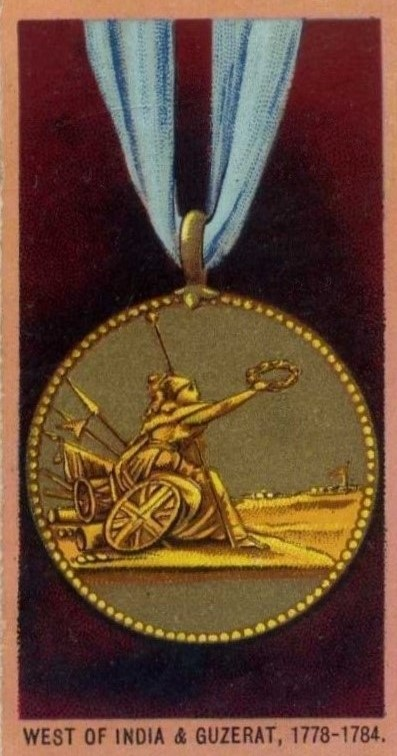
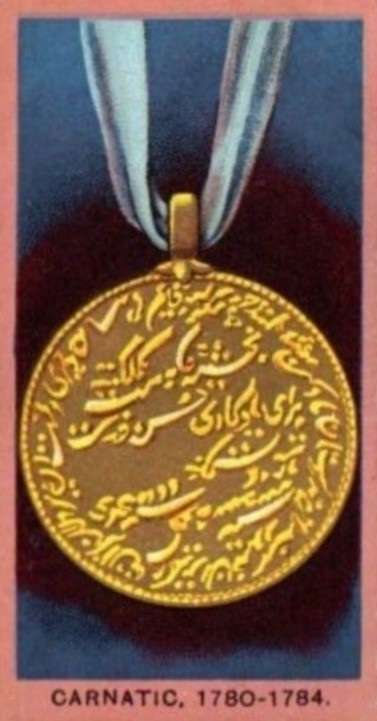
- Obverse and reverse depicted on cigarette cards (Note: The medal would have been suspended from a cord, not a ribbon)
- Type: Campaign medal
- Awarded for: Campaign service
- Presented by: the East India Company (EIC)
- Eligibility: Native EIC forces
- Campaign(s): First Maratha War, 1778–82; Second Mysore War, 1780–84
- Clasps: None
- Established: 1784
- Suspension cord for the medal

The Deccan Medal was the first campaign medal instituted by the East India Company (EIC). It was awarded to native Indian troops who took part in the major campaigns in India between 1778 and 1784. It is sometimes referred to as the Carnatic Medal.

== Criteria ==
The Deccan Medal was awarded to native Indian soldiers of the armies of the EIC who participated in the campaigns in the West of India and Guzerat, and the Carnatic region of Southern India, from 1778 to 1784. This included service in both the second phase of the First Maratha War of 1778–82 and the Second Mysore War of 1780–84.

The first campaign medal to be awarded by the EIC to all ranks, it was authorised in 1784 by the Governor-General of India. It was issued in two sizes: a larger medal to native officers, in gold to Subedars and silver to Jemadars; with a smaller silver medal to other ranks, including Havildars, Naiks and Sepoys. In January 1785 eligibility was extended to artillery Lascars. Europeans, including those in EIC service and with British Army, were not eligible for the medal. It was only awarded to those still alive when the roll of recipients was compiled in May 1785.

In addition to the medal, native soldiers who served in the relevant campaigns received additional pay of one rupee a month, while other ranks of EIC European units – who did not receive the medal – were granted a further two rupees a month. Each participating Indian battalion also received a pair of honorary standards.

== Description ==
The medal was struck and minted by a private contractor in Calcutta. The gold medals were 1.6 inches (41 mm) in diameter, while the silver were issued in two sizes: 1.6 inches (41 mm) and 1.25 inches (32 mm). All types have a common design:
The obverse depicts Britannia seated on a number of military trophies, holding a laurel wreath with her right hand towards a distant fort flying a Union Jack. There is no inscription.
The reverse has two Persian inscriptions that translate as: in the centre: As coins are current around the world, so shall be the bravery and exploits of those heroes by who the name of the victorious English Nation was carried from Bengal to the Deccan; around the edge: Presented AD 1784 (Hijri year 1199) by the East India Company's Calcutta Government.
The medal, issued unnamed, has a milled edge like a coin.
A ring suspension allowed the medal to be worn around the neck by way of a suspension cord, usually yellow or sand colour.
