= Burma Gallantry Medal =

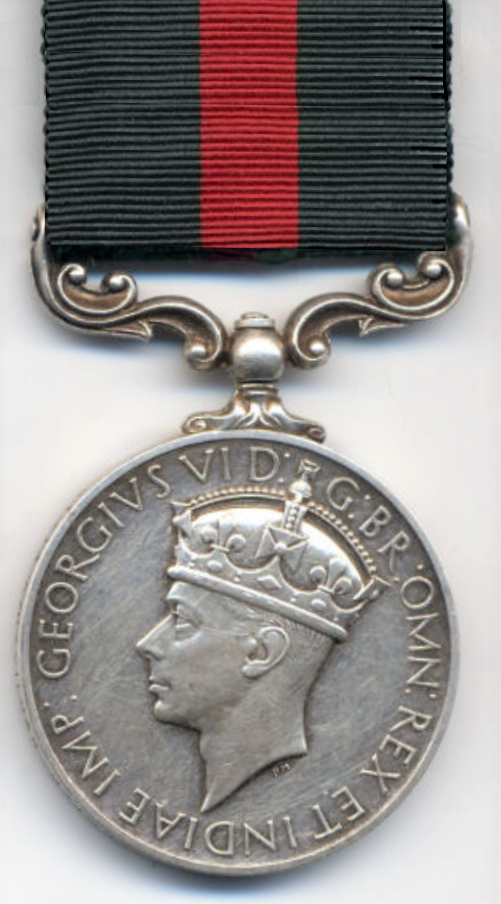
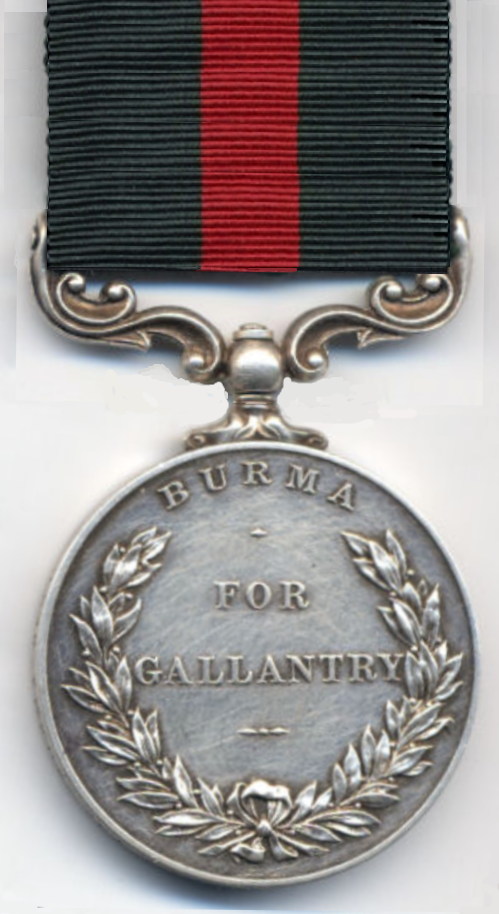
- Obverse and reverse of the medal
- Type: Gallantry decoration
- Awarded for: Acts of conspicuous gallantry performed in connection with assigned duties
- Country: British Burma
- Presented by: the Governor General of Burma
- Eligibility: Governor's commissioned officers, non-commissioned officers and other ranks of the armed forces of British Burma
- Post-nominals: BGM
- Campaign: World War II
- Status: No longer awarded
- Established: 10 May 1940
- First award: 26 March 1942
- Final award: 28 November 1947

Highlights
- Total: 207 and 3 clasps
- Ribbon bar

The Burma Gallantry Medal (BGM) was a military decoration awarded for acts of gallantry, in both war and peace, by Governor's commissioned officers, non-commissioned Officers and other ranks of the British Burmese military. These included its Army, Frontier Force, Military Police, Royal Naval Volunteer Reserve and Auxiliary Air Force. Clasps, attached to the ribbon, could be awarded to mark further awards of the medal.

When Burma ceased to be a province of British India in 1937 and became a separate colony, a distinct gallantry medal was required for its armed forces. In response, the Burma Gallantry Medal was established by royal warrant on 10 May 1940.

Between 26 March 1942 and 28 November 1947, a total of 207 medals and 3 clasps were awarded. In addition to the medal, recipients were entitled to a monthly monetary allowance, paid for life.

The medal became obsolete when Burma gained independence on 4 January 1948.

== Appearance ==
The medal 36 mm in diameter, is circular and made of silver. The obverse bears the crowned effigy of King George VI facing left with the inscription GEORGIVS VI D:G:BR:OMN:REX ET INDIAE:IMP. The reverse bears a laurel wreath and the inscription "Burma" and "For Gallantry". The medal is suspended from a dark green ribbon with a crimson central stripe.

The recipient's name, rank and unit were engraved on the rim of the medal.
