= Wider Service Medal =

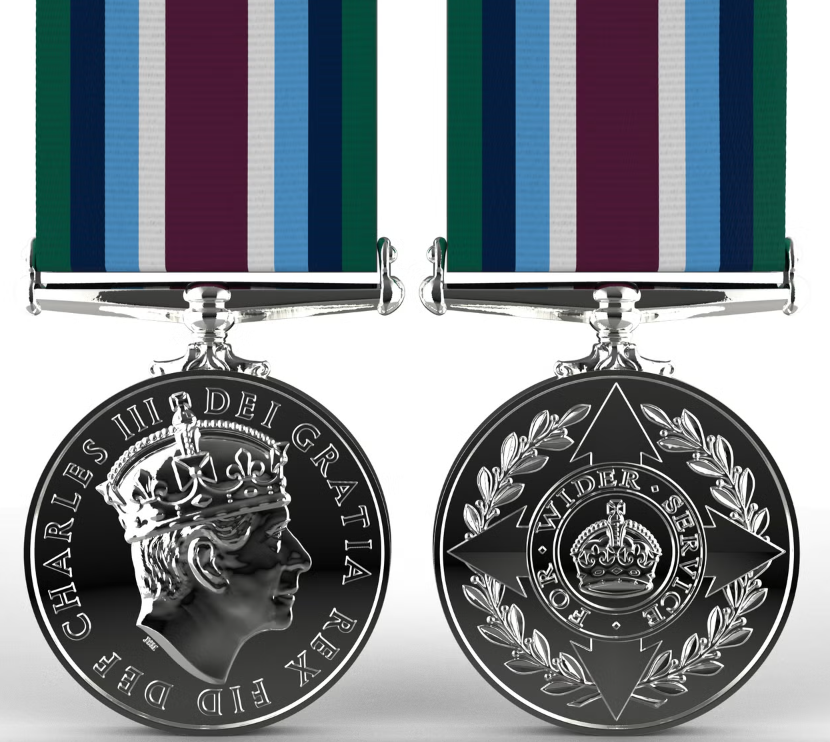
- Wider Service Medal
- Awarded for: Wider campaign service
- Description: Silver disk, 36mm diameter
- Presented by: the United Kingdom
- Eligibility: Members of the United Kingdom armed forces
- Campaign: Various operational deployments
- Status: Currently awarded
- Established: 2024
- Ribbon bar

The Wider Service Medal is a British award intended to recognise the service of members of the armed forces and civilians on operations classed as being "below the threshold for war", with a level of risk regarded as lower than that for which personnel might be eligible to receive either a relevant Operational Service Medal, or the General Service Medal with appropriate clasp.

== Background ==
In 2012, a review led by Sir John Holmes into the awarding of medals to the armed forces indicated that campaign medals were awarded on the basis of "risk and rigour", defined in terms of:

1. The risk and danger to life.
2. The style and force of the enemy.
3. The physical and mental stress and rigours experienced by individuals.
4. The restrictions, limitations and difficulty in implementing the operation, including climate, weather and terrain

The changing nature of global operations leads to the potential that large numbers of personnel in support and enabling roles may in future not be eligible for the receipt of medals, while the increasing number of operations that do not meet the risk and rigour criteria for the award of either a campaign medal or the GSM with clasp would see personnel deployed for long periods on hazardous operations without the prospect of an award at the end. As a result, the Holmes Review, as part of its recommendations, suggested the creation of a new medal aimed at rewarding this kind of operational service that would not meet the general criteria for the award of a campaign medal.

The concept for a new decoration was approved in principle by Queen Elizabeth II in December 2018. Final approval for the new decoration was granted by King Charles III in March 2024.

== Description ==
The obverse of the medal features the traditional effigy of the sovereign. The reverse depicts the crown within a ring containing the words "For Wider Service". From the ring emerge four arrows at the four cardinal points, symbolising "reach across the world", with the whole contained within a laurel wreath to symbolise service and achievement.

The medal ribbon contains a central purple stripe, which is intended to signify the cross-government nature of operations, with symmetrical narrower stripes of white, sky blue, dark blue and green outside the central stripe - these signify air operations (sky blue), naval operations (dark blue) and land operations (green) respectively.

== Qualification ==
The criteria for receipt of the Wider Service Medal were laid out upon the announcement of its release. Award of the medal is retrospective from 11 December 2018. (Note: The date upon which the new decoration received initial approval from Queen Elizabeth II.) Personnel must have served 180 days aggregated (not necessarily continuous) service on eligible operations. Additional service up to another 180 days will see individuals receive a bar to the medal, with a maximum of three bars capable of being awarded.

The initial set of operations eligible for the award of the Wider Service Medal were:

- Operation AZOTIZE - the UK contribution to the NATO Baltic Air Policing mission
- Operation BILOXI - the UK contribution to the NATO Southern Air Policing mission
- Operation CABRIT - the forward deployment of UK land forces to Estonia and Poland as part of the NATO Enhanced Forward Presence
- Operation KIPION - the ongoing UK presence in the Persian Gulf region
- Operation ORBITAL - the UK operation to provide training and support to Armed Forces of Ukraine from 2015 to 2022
- Operation RELENTLESS - the UK's Continuous At-Sea nuclear deterrent operation
- Operation WOODWALL (Note: Operation WOODWALL was renamed as Operation HIGHWALL in May 2024.) - the UK's forward deployment of two offshore patrol vessels to the Indo-Pacific region
