= Malawi Independence Medal =

- Ribbon of the medal
- Type: Independence Medal
- Awarded for: Service to Malawi, and to mark the country's independence as an independent Dominion / Commonwealth realm
- Presented by: Malawi
- Eligibility: Military, civilian and police personnel
- Established: 30 June 1964

The Malawi Independence Medal was authorized by Queen Elizabeth II to commemorate Malawi's independence. The medal gives recognition to members of the Malawian Defence Force and the police, who served on 6 July 1964, as well as to those citizens and civil servants who have rendered outstanding public service to Malawi.

== Description ==
- The circular cupro-nickel Malawi Independence Medal features the crowned effigy of Queen Elizabeth II.
- The reverse of the medal depicts the Malawi Coat of Arms and the inscription Malawi Independence, 6 July 1964.
- The ribbon has three vertical stripes of black, red and green.
