= Mysore Medal =

Campaign medal awarded by the Governor-General of India to native Indian soldiers

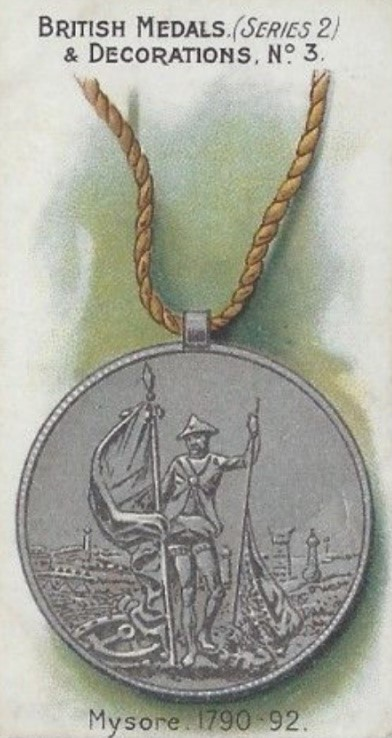
- Obverse of the medal depicted on a cigarette card
- Type: Campaign medal
- Awarded for: Campaign service
- Presented by: the Honourable East India Company (HEIC)
- Eligibility: Native HEIC forces
- Campaign(s): Third Anglo-Mysore War
- Clasps: None
- Established: 1793
- Total: Approximately 7,000
- Suspension cord for the medal

The Mysore Medal is a campaign medal that was awarded by the Governor-General of India to native Indian soldiers of the armies of the Honourable East India Company (HEIC) who participated in the Third Anglo-Mysore War of 1790 to 1792.

== Criteria ==
The Third Anglo–Mysore War was fought between the Kingdom of Mysore and the British HEIC and its allies. The war ended in March 1792 with the Treaty of Seringapatam, in which Mysore gave up much of its territory.

The medal was authorised in April 1793 by Lord Cornwallis, the Governor-General of India, who had commanded HEIC forces in Mysore. It was awarded to native Indian members of the HEIC forces: in gold to more senior native officers including Subedars; in silver to junior officers including Jemadars and Serangs; with NCOs and Sepoys, including Havildars, Naiks, Tindals and Lascars receiving a smaller silver medal. Europeans, including those in HEIC service and with British Army, did not receive the medal.

In total, about 7,000 medals were awarded.

In addition to the medal, HEIC soldiers who served in the campaign received an additional six months batta allowance.

HEIC regiments that took part in the campaign received the battle honour Mysore (1789–91).

== Description ==
The Government of India commissioned a private goldsmith in Calcutta to prepare the dies and strike the medals in gold and in silver. The gold medals were 1.7 inches (43 mm) in diameter, while the silver were issued in two sizes: 1.7 inches (43 mm) and 1.5 inches (38 mm). All types had a common design:

The obverse depicts a full-length image of a Sepoy holding a Union Jack in his right hand and the flag of Mysore, upside down, in his left. In the background is the fortress of Seringapatam. There is no inscription on the obverse.

The reverse has, within a laurel wreath, the English wording FOR SERVICES IN MYSORE AD 1791-1792 with, around the edge, the Persian inscription that translates as: A token of the bravery of the troops of the English Government in the war in Mysore, in the Hijri years 1205-1206.
The medal was issued unnamed.
A ring suspension allowed the medal to be worn around the neck by way of a suspension cord, usually yellow or sand colour.
