= Ashanti Star =

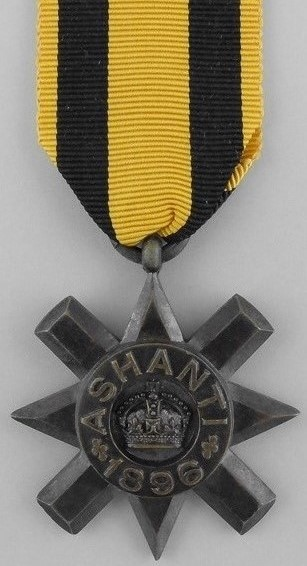
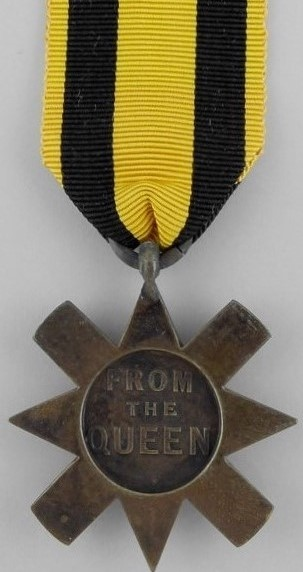
- Obvserse and reverse of the medal
- Type: Campaign medal
- Awarded for: Campaign Service
- Description: Bronze, 38mm diameter
- Presented by: UK
- Eligibility: British and Colonial forces
- Campaign: Fourth Anglo-Ashanti War
- Clasps: none
- Established: 1896

Highlights
- Total: Circa 2,000
- Ribbon bar of the medal
- Related: Ashantee Medal (1873-74); Ashanti Medal (1901)

The Ashanti Star was created in 1896 for the members of the expedition against the Ashanti King Prempeh, in the Fourth Anglo-Ashanti War that lasted from December 1895 to February 1896.

The forces who qualified for the medal included the second Battalion of the West Yorkshire Regiment and a composite battalion consisting of between 16 and 26 men from each of the three regiments of Foot Guards and from eight infantry regiments. About half the troops deployed were locally recruited Hausa forces. Three Nursing Sisters were also present and received the medal.

== Description ==
A bronze four pointed star superimposed on a saltire cross, 38mm wide, suspended by a loop and ring.

Obverse: a central medallion with a circlet inscribed "Ashanti 1896", surrounding an imperial crown.

Reverse: within a circular central recess the inscription "From the Queen", the rest of the reverse surface is plain.

Ribbon: 31 millimetres (1.2 in) wide, yellow with two black stripes.

Naming: Awarded unnamed, except to members of the West Yorkshire Regiment, whose colonel had the medals engraved at his own expense.

The design is attributed to Princess Beatrice, Queen Victoria’s youngest daughter, whose husband, Prince Henry of Battenberg, died of malaria during the campaign.
