= Nepal Medal =

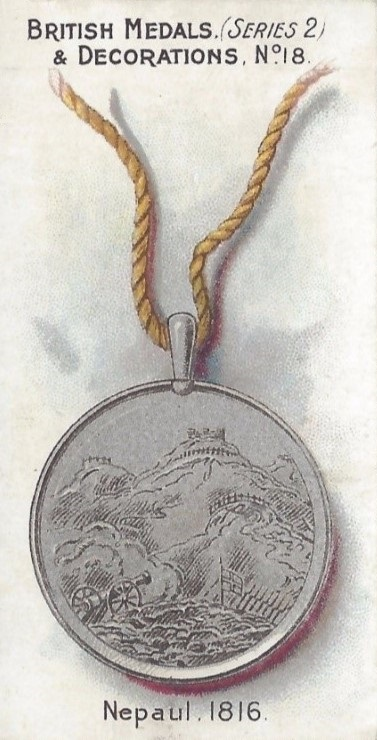
- Obverse of the medal depicted on a cigarette card
- Awarded for: Distinguished conduct
- Description: Circular silver medal
- Presented by: the Honourable East India Company (HEIC)
- Eligibility: HEIC forces
- Campaign: Anglo-Nepalese War (1814-16)
- Clasps: None
- Established: 1816
- Total: 300
- Suspension cord for the medal

The Nepal Medal was awarded by the Honourable East India Company (HEIC) to officers of native Indian units, and Indian soldiers for particularly distinguished conduct, during the Anglo-Nepalese War of 1814–16.

== Criteria ==
The War was fought between the British HEIC and the Kingdom of Nepal as a result of border disputes between the two countries. The war ended in 1816 with the Treaty of Sugauli, in which Nepal ceded territory to the HEIC, agreed to a British representative in Kathmandu and allowed Britain to recruit Gurkhas for military service with the HEIC.

The medal was authorised on 20 March 1816 by the Marquess of Hastings, Governor-General of India, for award to all native Indian officers, and to selected native soldiers of the armies of the Honourable East India Company for distinguished zeal and courage during the War. A total of 300 medals were awarded.

While members of the British Army present were not eligible for the medal, surviving British soldiers, and native soldiers serving with HEIC forces who had not received the Nepal Medal, were entitled to the Army of India Medal with clasp Nepaul, when this medal was established in 1851. It had initially been proposed that, rather than the Army of India Medal, surviving Indian veterans would receive the 1816 Nepal Medal. It was however finally decided that they would be entitled to the Army of India Medal, provided they had not been awarded the 1816 Medal at the time.

== Description ==
The medal is silver and was struck at the Calcutta Mint. It is 2.0 inches (51 mm) in diameter and has the following design:
The obverse depicts a fortified mountain-top with, in the foreground, a cannon and troops marching with a flag and fitted bayonets behind a hill. There is no inscription.
The reverse has the Persian inscription This medal was conferred by the Nawab Governor-General Baghatur, in testimony of the energy, good service, skill and intrepidity which was displayed during the campaigns in the hills, in the Hijri years 1229 and 1230.
The medal was issued unnamed.
The suspension is a flattened loop, pinned at the base, through which passes a suspension cord or narrow ribbon, allowing the medal to be worn around the neck.
