= Southern Rhodesia Medal for War Service =

Southern Rhodesia Service Medal
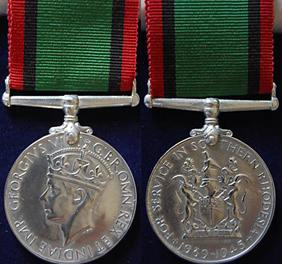
- Obverse and reverse of the medal
- Awarded by UK and Commonwealth
Type	Campaign medal
Eligibility	Southern Rhodesia Defence Forces
Awarded for	Campaign service
Campaign	Home service, 1939 –1945
Description	Cupro-nickel, 36mm diameter
Clasps	None

Statistics
Established	1948
Total awards	3,908
Related	War Medal 1939–1945
- Ribbon bar

The Southern Rhodesia Service Medal 1939–1945 was a campaign medal of the British Commonwealth. It was awarded to members of the Southern Rhodesia Defence Forces for home service during World War II.

== Eligibility ==
After the war, the colony's government pressed the Dominions Office in London for a distinct Southern Rhodesian war medal for home service, to reward those who would otherwise not have received a campaign medal. In response, the Southern Rhodesia Service Medal was authorised in 1948 and distributed from 1949.

The medal was awarded to members of the Southern Rhodesian Defence Forces who had at least six months full or part-time service between 3 September 1939 and 2 September 1945, and who were not eligible for any other British World War II campaign medal.

- A total of 3,908 medals were awarded, mainly to those who had served part-time:
  - Southern Rhodesia Territorial Force: 3,140
  - British South Africa Police Reservists: 497
  - Those who served with both bodies: 271

While most of the recipients were white, 62 Africans serving with the British South Africa Police received the medal.

== Description ==
- It is a circular, cupro-nickel medal, 36 millimetres (1.4 in) in diameter.
- The obverse has the crowned effigy of King George VI facing left, with the legend "GEORGIVS VI D:G:BR:OMN:REX ET INDIAE IMP." (George VI by the grace of God King of Great Britain and Emperor of India).
- The reverse was designed by Humphrey Paget and shows the coat of arms of Southern Rhodesia, surrounded by the words "+ FOR SERVICE IN SOUTHERN RHODESIA + 1939-1945".
- The ribbon, 31.7 millimetres (1.25 in) wide, is beetle green with red and black stripes at each edge, the colours of the Rhodesia Regiment.
- The medal was issued unnamed.

== Clasps ==
There are no clasps for this medal
