= Coorg Medal =

East India medal for loyal Coorgs during 1837 Coorg rebellion

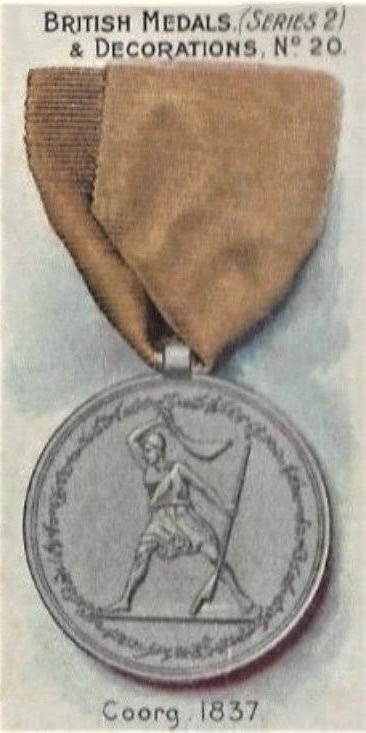
- Obverse of the medal depicted on a cigarette card
- Presented by: the Honourable East India Company (HEIC)
- Eligibility: Local forces loyal to the HEIC
- Campaign(s): Coorg rebellion of 1837
- Clasps: None
- Established: 1837
- Total: 44 gold and 300 silver medals
- Suspension cord for the medal

The Coorg Medal was awarded by the Honourable East India Company (HEIC) to local forces who remained loyal during the Coorg rebellion of 1837.

== Criteria ==
Coorg, a small state in Southern India, was annexed into the Madras Presidency of the British HEIC after the Coorg War of 1834. In April 1837 a rebellion broke out, but soon ended when many chiefs and local troops gave their support to the British. This medal was awarded to loyal Coorgs who helped suppress the rebellion.

The medal was authorised in August 1837 by the Governor-General of India on the recommendation of Colonel Mark Cubbon, the local HEIC Commissioner, with the cost met from prize money obtained from the rebels. The medals were despatched to Coorg for presentation in November 1839.

The medal was not awarded to all participants, but only to the most senior among the loyal Coorgs, and to others who distinguished themselves. Dewans, Subedars and other chiefs received the medal in gold (44 awarded), with fourteen of the most distinguished receiving it suspended from a gold chain. Those lesser leaders and Ryots (peasant class combattants) who most distinguished themselves received the medal in silver (300 awarded). Europeans, and members of the armies of the Honourable East India Company from outside Coorg, were not eligible.

Other rewards were also presented to selected Coorgs, including gifts of horses to Coorg chiefs, while one Coorg Subedar was presented with a special sword after his own was lost in an attack.

== Description ==
The medal was struck at the Calcutta Mint in gold and in silver, with the gold version produced in three thicknesses, reflecting the status of the recipient. All types were just under 2 inches (50 mm) in diameter with the following design:
The obverse depicts the figure of a Coorg warrior raising a knife in his right hand ready to strike, while his left hand holds a musket. Around the perimeter is the inscription in Canarese script: A mark of favour given for loyalty to the Company's Government in suppressing rebellion in the months of April and May 1837.
The reverse shows crossed knives and other Coorg ornaments within a wreath, surrounded by the English language inscription: For distinguished conduct and loyalty to the British Government. Coorg April 1837.
The medal was issued unnamed.

The suspension is a flattened loop, pinned at the base. The medal was worn around the neck, with fourteen of the gold medals awarded to more senior officers and chiefs worn from a chain, the remaining gold and all silver medals worn suspended from a cord.

Although specimens in bronze or copper are known, they were not issued and may be later copies.

== Bibliography ==
- Collett, D.W, Medals Yearbook, (1981) Medal Year Book. ISBN 0950694312
- Duckers, Peter, British Military Medals: A Guide for the Collector and Family Historian (2nd ed.), (2013). Pen & Sword Books. ISBN 978-1-47383-099-8
- Joslin, Litherland, and Simpkin (eds), British Battles and Medals, (1988). Spink & Son, London. ISBN 978-0-907605-25-6
- Mayo, John Horsley, Medals and Decorations of the British Army and Navy, Volume I, (1897). A. Constable & Co.
- Mayo, John Horsley, Medals and Decorations of the British Army and Navy, Volume II, (1897). A. Constable & Co.
- Mussell, John W. (ed) – Medals Yearbook – 2015, Token Publishing. ISBN 978-1-908-828-16-3
- Steward, William Augustus, War Medals and Their History, (1915). Stanley Paul & Co, London.
