= Nuclear Test Medal =

- Type: Service medal
- Awarded for: Service during nuclear testing programmes
- Description: Nickel-silver, 36 mm diameter
- Presented by: UK
- Eligibility: British forces and civilian personnel, foreign personnel involved with UK nuclear testing programme
- Campaign: UK nuclear weapons testing programmes
- Established: 21 November 2022
- Ribbon bar

The Nuclear Test Medal is an award intended to recognise the service of personnel involved in the United Kingdom's nuclear weapons testing programmes.

== History ==
Following many years of campaigning, in November 2022, the British Government announced the creation of a new medal intended to recognise the contribution of military and civilian personnel that took part in the various programmes aimed at developing nuclear weapons to be used by the British Armed Forces. The announcement was made to coincide with the 70th anniversary of the first UK nuclear test. In July 2023, the design of the new medal was released, with a commitment that many eligible veterans would receive their medals by Remembrance Sunday in November 2023.

== Description ==
The medal features a crowned effigy of Charles III facing right with the inscription CHARLES III DEI GRATIA REX FID DEF on the obverse, while the reverse shows an atom design surrounded by olive branches, with the words NUCLEAR TEST MEDAL beneath. It was manufactured by Worcestershire Medal Service.

The ribbon has a central white stripe, with symmetrical stripes of yellow, black and red, and sky blue stripes on the out edge – the blue is intended to represent the sky and the sea in the Pacific, where the UK's nuclear tests took place.

== Qualification ==
To qualify for the Nuclear Test Medal, individuals need to have served at locations where atmospheric testing took place during the UK's atomic and thermonuclear development programmes between 1952 and 1967, on one of the following test operations:

- Operation HURRICANE – October 1952, Montebello Islands, Western Australia
- Operation TOTEM – October 1953, Emu Field, South Australia
- Operation MOSAIC – June 1956, Montebello Islands, Western Australia
- Operation BUFFALO – September – October 1956, Maralinga, South Australia
- Operation GRAPPLE – May 1957 – September 1958, Malden Island, Kiribati
- Operation ANTLER – September – October 1957, Maralinga, South Australia

Although the UK did not conduct nuclear testing after 1957, eligibility for the medal covers not just participation in the tests themselves, but also in the preparation and clean-up phases. (Note: The clean-up operations primarily took place at Maralinga in South Australia and were codenamed as Operation CLEAN-UP (1963), Operation HERCULES (1964) and Operation BRUMBY (1967)) The medal can also be awarded to any UK personnel that participated in Operation DOMINIC, a series of atmospheric nuclear tests undertaken by the United States in locations including the island of Kiritimati between April and October 1962, as well as all UK Service and civilian personnel who served at the locations where American atmospheric nuclear tests took place, including under Operation BAGPIPES (1954). The eligibility criteria has been expanded to include all UK Service and civilian personnel who deployed from the UK on operations to monitor atmospheric nuclear tests conducted by France and China (to 1974 and 1980 respectively), Foreign nationals who served at the locations where the UK atmospheric nuclear tests were conducted, including the preparatory and clear-up phases, between 1952 and 1967. To be awarded, the recipient should have served either as a member of the armed forces, or as civilian personnel in one of the named operational areas. (Note: Civilian personnel would be primarily those serving with either the Atomic Weapons Research Establishment or the Atomic Energy Research Establishment) Recipients from Australia, New Zealand, Fiji and Kiribati are also eligible. The medal can be awarded posthumously.
