= Gwalior Star =

British East India Company medal, 1843

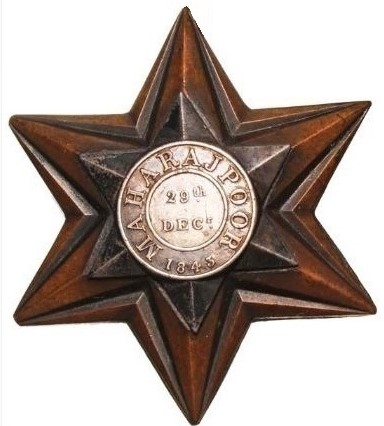
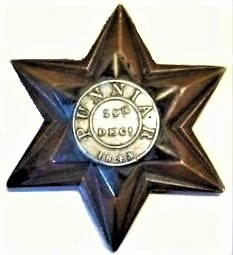
- Gwalior Star: versions awarded for the battles of Maharajpoor and Punniar.
- Type: Campaign medal
- Awarded for: Battles of Maharajpoor and Punniar
- Presented by: British East India Company
- Eligibility: Officers and other ranks
- Campaign: Gwalior Campaign
- Clasps: None
- Ribbon bar of the award

The Gwalior Star is a Campaign medal presented by the Honourable East India Company to the soldiers of the British Army and the British led Bengal Army who took part in the 1843 Gwalior campaign.

== History ==
Rising tensions between the East India Company and the State of Gwalior led to a British led advance into Gwalior early in December 1843 in a two pronged attack. On December 29, 1843, the British Army defeated Maharaja Shrimant Jayaji Rao Scindia, and regained control of Gwalior. The first division of the army, commanded by General Sir Hugh Gough, was victorious at the Battle of Maharajpoor. Major-General Grey, on the same day, with the second division, was victorious at the Battle of Punniar.

== Description ==
This medal is a 50 millimetres (2.0 in) diameter six pointed star made of bronze, from guns captured during the Gwalior Campaign. In the centre of the star is a silver disk, which bears the Date 29th Dec, 1843 and the name of one of the Gwalior Campaign battles, either Maharajpoor or Punniar. The reverse of the medal is plain and engraved with the name and regiment of the soldier to whom the medal was awarded.
Manufactured at the Calcutta Mint, this medal was presented by the British India Government originally as a star with a clip on the back to be worn on the breast. Eventually most of these were fitted with a ring or bar of varying design, so that they could be suspended by a ribbon and worn with other medals. The ribbon used was the common ribbon used on many East India Company medals, which was a red-white-yellow-white-blue gradient ribbon such as that found on the Candahar, Ghuznee, Cabul Medal.

== Lady's Star for Maharajpoor ==
Lord Ellenborough, the Governor-General of India, presented a special gold star to each of four wives of army officers who, due to the speed of events, found themselves present at the Battle of Maharajpoor.
While the design of the star broadly follows that of the campaign medal, the obverse centre bears the head of Queen Victoria, with the name and date of the battle on the reverse. The star is suspended from a gold and enamel imitation ribbon and buckle. Lady Gough had her portrait painted wearing the Lady's Star.
