= Scinde Medal =

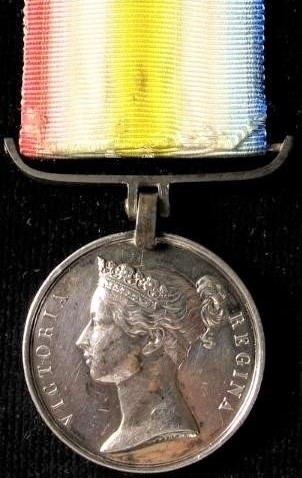
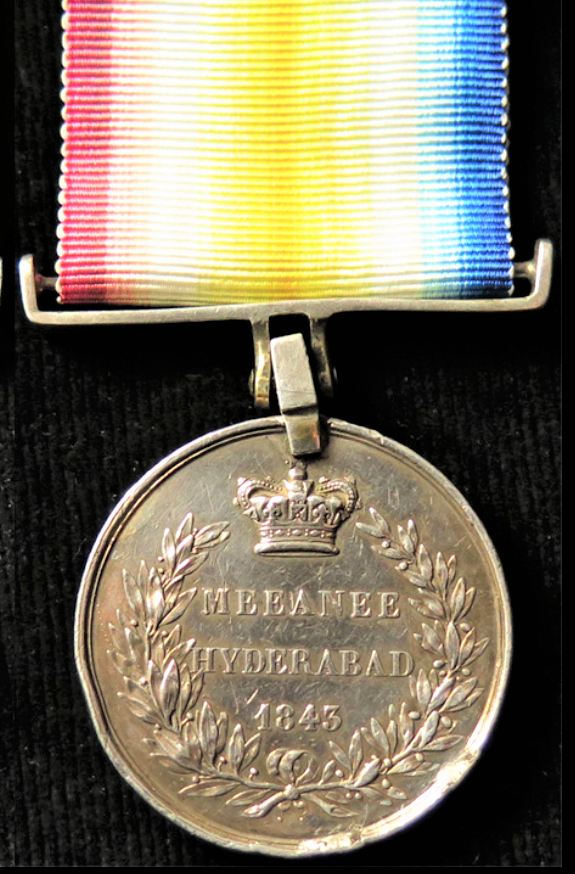
- Obverse and reverse of the medal for those present at the Battles of Miani and Hyderabad
- Type: Campaign medal
- Awarded for: Campaign service.
- Description: Silver disk 36 mm wide
- Presented by: Honourable East India Company (United Kingdom)
- Eligibility: British Army; Indian Army, mainly from the Bombay Presidency
- Campaign(s): MEEANEE 1843, HYDERABAD 1843, MEEANEE, HYDERABAD 1843
- Clasps: None
- Established: 1843
- Ribbon bar.

The Scinde Medal (Sindhi: سندي ميڊل) was authorised on 22 September 1843 and issued to soldiers of the Honourable East India Company, the 22nd Regiment of Foot of the British Army and members of the Indian Navy who crewed the Indus Flotilla, who participated in Major General Sir Charles Napier's conquest of Scinde between 1842 and 1843.

== History ==
Sir Charles Napier was sent to Sindh for the purpose of quelling the Amirs of Sindh, Mir Rustam Khan Talpur, Mir Nasir Khan Talpur and Mir Sher Muhammad Talpur. They had made various hostile demonstrations against the British government after the termination of the First Anglo-Afghan War, conducting frequent raids on British convoys travelling between India and Afghanistan. General Napier's campaign against these Amirs resulted, after the victories of Miani and Hyderabad, in the complete subjugation of the province of Sindh, and its annexation to the Bombay Presidency of the British Raj.

== Description ==
The medal, designed by William Wyon, was a silver disc 36 millimetres (1.4 in) wide, with the following design:

Obverse: Left facing, diademed bust of Queen Victoria facing left with inscription VICTORIA REGINA.

Reverse: Three different versions were issued, all containing the name and year of the battle(s) where the recipient was present, surrounded by a laurel wreath and surmounted by a crown:

- MEEANEE / 1843. For participation in the Battle of Miani (or Meeanee), 17 February 1843.
- HYDERABAD / 1843. For participation in the Battle of Hyderabad, 24 March 1843.
- MEEANEE / HYDERABAD / 1843. For participation in both battles.

Suspender: Straight Steel Clip and straight bar suspender. The suspenders on the medals issued to the 22nd Foot were replaced with silver ones at the expense of the unit's Commanding Officer, Lieutenant Colonel Pennefather after they particularly distinguished themselves.

Ribbon: 45 millimetres (1.8 in) rainbow pattern watered red, white, yellow, white and blue.

Engraving: Impressed or engraved with recipient's name and regiment around the rim.
