= Tibet Medal =

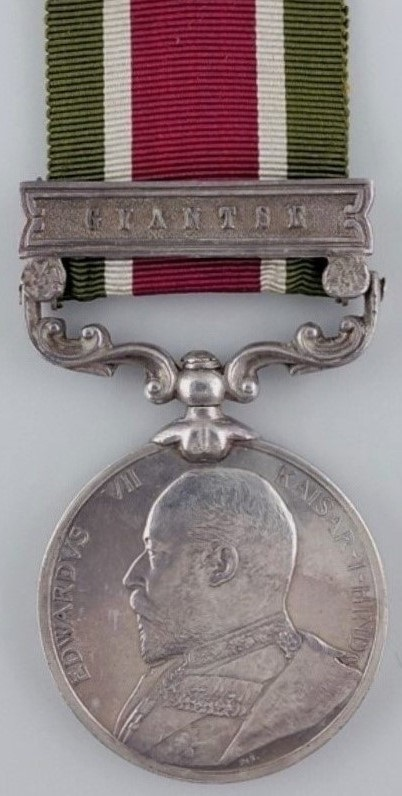
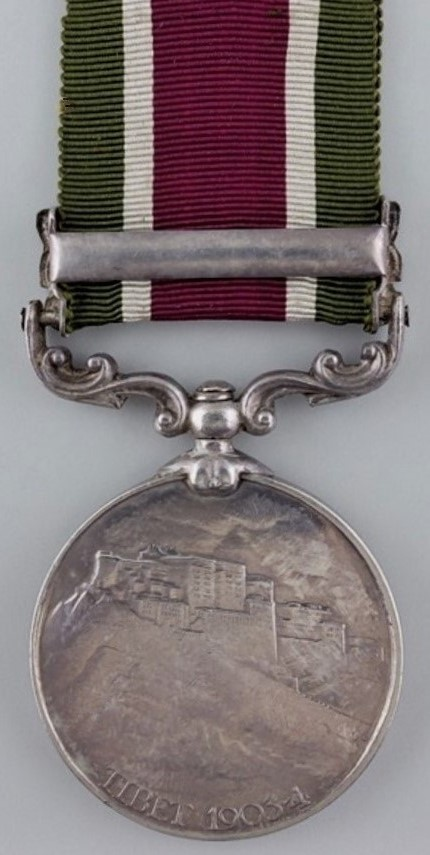
- Obverse and reverse of the medal, with 'Gyantse' clasp.
- Type: Campaign medal
- Awarded for: Campaign service.
- Description: Silver or bronze disk 36 mm wide
- Presented by: United Kingdom of Great Britain and Ireland
- Eligibility: British Army.
- Campaign: Tibet 1903–04
- Clasps: Gyantse
- Established: 1 February 1905
- Ribbon: red edged in white with green outer edges

The Tibet Medal was authorised in February 1905 for all members of the Tibet Mission and accompanying troops who served at or beyond Siliguri from 13 December 1903, to 23 September 1904.

The obverse of the medal, designed by G. W. de Saulles, shows the left-facing bust of Edward VII in Field Marshal's uniform and the legend 'EDWARDVS VII KAISAR-I-HIND'.
The reverse, designed by E. G. Gillick, depicts the Potala (winter palace of the Dalai Lamas) in Lhasa on top of the red hill with the words 'TIBET 1903–04' below.
The suspender is of the swivelling ornate scroll type.
The clasp 'GYANTSE' was given to those present in operations between 3 May and 6 July 1904, in or near Gyantse Fortress.
Both silver and bronze medals were issued named to the recipient on the rim in a cursive script.
The 1.25 inches (32 mm) wide ribbon is maroon, flanked by narrow white, and wider green, stripes.

The medal was awarded in silver to combatant troops and in bronze to camp followers, with both eligible for the 'Gyantse' clasp. Approximately 3,350 silver medals were awarded, including about 600 to the first battalion of the Royal Fusiliers, the only British Army unit present, and about 2,600 to members of the Indian Army, in addition to staff and support personnel. In excess of 2,500 bronze medals were awarded, mainly to those employed in transporting supplies over the difficult terrain, including to the Peshawar Camel Corps and locally-recruited coolies.

== See also ==
- British expedition to Tibet
