= East and Central Africa Medal =

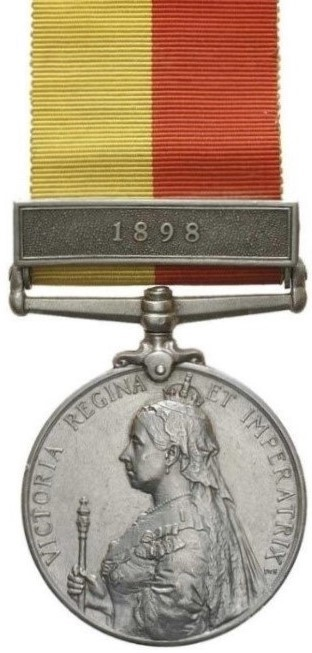
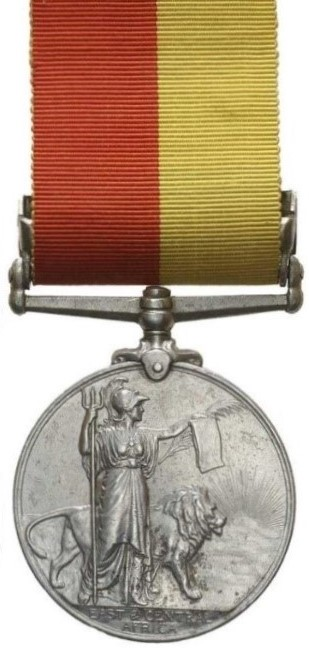
- Obverse and reverse of the medal
- Type: Campaign medal
- Awarded for: Campaign service.
- Presented by: United Kingdom of Great Britain and Ireland
- Eligibility: British and locally recruited forces.
- Campaign(s): East and Central Africa 1897-1899
- Clasps: Uganda 1897-98; Lubwa's; 1898; Uganda 1899
- Ribbon: half yellow, half red

The East and Central Africa Medal, established in February 1899, was a British campaign medal awarded for minor military operations in the Uganda Protectorate and Southern Sudan between 1897 and 1899. Four separate clasps were issued.

Most medals were awarded to British-led local forces or units of the Indian Army. No British Army units were present, although a number of British officers and non commissioned officers received the medal while seconded to local units. The recipients of the Lubwa's and Uganda 1897-98 clasps included several women who nursed the sick.

The medal is 36 millimetres (1.4 in) in diameter. It was issued in silver to all recipients, except for native porters and other authorised camp followers, who received the medal in bronze.
The obverse of the medal bears a left facing half-length figure of Queen Victoria holding the Royal Sceptre with the inscription "VICTORIA REGINA ET IMPERATRIX".
The reverse, designed by G. W. de Saulles, has an image of Britannia standing and facing right, holding a trident and palm branch, while behind is a lion and the rising sun. Below is the inscription "EAST & CENTRAL AFRICA".

The name and regiment of the recipient are engraved in capitals on the rim of the medal.

The 31.7 millimetres (1.25 in) wide ribbon is half yellow and half red, with the yellow to the left when facing the wearer.

== Clasps ==
Most medals were awarded with a clasp, with a total of four authorised. Lubwa's was only awarded as part of a two clasp medal, usually with Uganda 1897-98. The clasps awarded were:

- Lubwa's

Operation against mutinous Sudanese soldiers stationed in Uganda who held Fort Lubwa's on Lake Victoria, 23 September 1897 - 24 February 1898

- Uganda 1897-98

An expedition into the Teita country of Uganda, 20 July 1897 - 19 March 1898

- 1898

For service in quelling a rebellion by the Ogaden Somalis led by Sultan Ahmed bin Marghan, 12 April - 3 October 1898

- Uganda 1899

For service in the Uganda Protectorate along the Nile to quell a rebellion by local rulers Kabarega and Mwanga II of Buganda, 21 March - 2 May 1899
