= Presidency armies =

Armies of the East India Company

- Active: 1774–1895
- Country: India
- Allegiance: East India Company
- Branch: Bombay Army; Bengal Army; Madras Army
- Headquarters: GHQ India
- Mottos: Auspicio Regis et Senatus Angliae "By command of the King and Parliament of England"
- Engagements: Battle of Plassey; Battle of Buxar; Carnatic Wars; Anglo-Mysore Wars; Anglo-Maratha Wars; Vellore Mutiny; Anglo-Nepalese War; Anglo-Burmese wars; First Anglo-Afghan War; First Anglo-Sikh War; Second Anglo-Sikh War; Anglo-Persian War; Indian Rebellion of 1857

Commanders
- Notable commanders: Stringer Lawrence; Eyre Coote; Robert Clive; Charles Napier; Charles Cornwallis; Arthur Wellesley; Archibald Campbell; Gerard Lake; James Outram; Hugh Gough

The Presidency armies were the armies of the three presidencies of the East India Company's rule in India, later the forces of the British Crown in India, composed primarily of Indian sepoys. The presidency armies were named after the presidencies: the Bengal Army, the Madras Army and the Bombay Army. Initially, only Europeans served as commissioned or non-commissioned officers. In time, Indian Army units were garrisoned from Peshawar in the north, to Sind in the west, and to Rangoon in the east. The army was engaged in the wars to extend British control in India (the Mysore, Maratha and Sikh wars) and beyond (the Burma, Afghan, First and Second Opium Wars, and the Expedition to Abyssinia).

The presidency armies, like the presidencies themselves, belonged to the company until the Indian Rebellion of 1857, when the Crown took over the company and its three armies. In 1895, the three presidency armies were merged into a united Indian Army.

== Origin ==
The origin of the British Indian Army and subsequently the army of independent India lies in the origins of the Presidency Armies which preceded them. The first purely Indian troops employed by the British were watchmen employed in each of the Presidencies of the British East India Company to protect their trading stations. These were all placed in 1748 under one Commander-in-Chief, Major-General Stringer Lawrence who is regarded as the "Father of the Indian Army".

From the mid-eighteenth century, the East India Company began to maintain armies at each of its three main stations, or Presidencies of British India, at Calcutta (Bengal), Madras and Bombay. The Bengal Army, Madras Army, and Bombay Army were quite distinct, each with its own Regiments and cadre of European officers. All three armies contained European regiments in which both the officers and men were Europeans, as well as a larger number of 'Native' regiments, in which the officers were Europeans and the other ranks were Indians. They included Artillery, Cavalry and Infantry regiments, so historical sources refer to the Bengal/Madras/Bombay Artillery/Cavalry/Infantry (the latter often termed "Native Infantry" or "N.I."). From the mid-eighteenth century onwards, the Crown began to dispatch regiments of the regular British Army to India, to reinforce the company's armies. These troops are often referred to as "H.M.'s Regiments" or "Royal regiments".

By 1824, the size of the combined armies of Bengal, Madras, and Bombay was about 200,000 and had at least 170 sepoy and 16 European regiments. In 1844 the combined average strength of the three armies was 235,446 native and 14,584 European.

== Regimental organisation ==
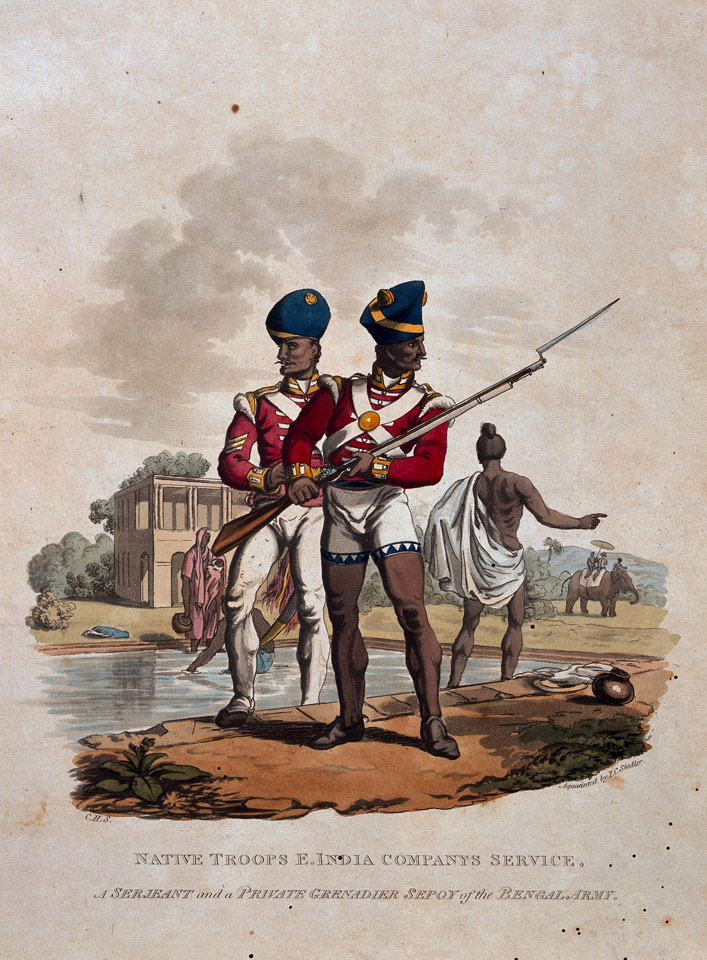
1812 engraving of a havildar and sepoy of a Bengal Native Infantry grenadier company

In 1757, Robert Clive came up with the idea of sepoy battalions for the Bengal Presidency. These would be Indian soldiers, armed, dressed, and trained the same as the "red coats" (British soldiers), and commanded by a nucleus of British officers. The Madras Presidency followed suit with six battalions in 1759, followed by the Bombay Presidency in 1767. Recruitment in all cases was done locally, with battalions each drawn from single castes, and from specific communities, villages, and families. Regular cavalry regiments were raised in 1784, of which only three survived the Indian Rebellion of 1857. Irregular cavalry were raised by the "silladar system" employed by rulers of Indian states. Irregular cavalry regiments had very few British officers. In addition, native artillery and pioneers (referred to later as Sappers and Miners) were also raised.

Between 1796 and 1804, a regimental system on a two battalion basis was introduced. The battalions were only theoretically linked together and shared no esprit de corps. The number of British officers went up to 22 per battalion, which diminished the importance of native officers. Control by Regimental commanders was excessive and exasperating to the battalions, and the system was reverted in 1824. Thereafter, units were formed into single battalion regiments, which were numbered per their seniority of raising.

== After 1857 ==
Following the Indian Rebellion of 1857 and the consequent takeover of power by the British government from the East India Company, its European regiments were amalgamated in 1860 with the British Army, but its 'Native' regiments were not. The three separate Presidency Armies therefore continued to exist, and their European officers continued to be listed as members of the Bengal, Madras or Bombay Army rather than the British Army. However, the Presidency Armies began to be described collectively as the Indian Army. Following the Rebellion recruitment of 'Native' Regiments switched to the Martial Race system. Another change resulting from the Indian Rebellion of 1857 was that henceforward artillery was confined to the British Army.

In 1895, the separate Presidency Armies were at last abolished and a fully unified Indian Army came into being. As before, its British officers were not members of the British Army, though as young subalterns they did serve for a year with a British Army regiment as part of their training before taking up permanent commissions with their Indian Army regiment.

== Operational history of the Presidency armies ==
"so long as the Sepoys maintain their formations, which they call 'lines', they are like an immovable volcano spewing artillery and rifle fire like unrelenting hail on the enemy, and they are seldom defeated."

— Dean Mahomed, a Bengal Army sepoy

=== Mysore wars ===
- First Anglo-Mysore War (1766–69)
- Second Anglo-Mysore War (1780–84)
- Third Anglo-Mysore War (1789–92)
- Fourth Anglo-Mysore War (1799)

=== Maratha wars ===
- First Anglo-Maratha War (1775–82)
- Second Anglo-Maratha War (1803–05)
- Third Anglo-Maratha War (1817–18)

=== Burmese wars ===
- First Anglo-Burmese War (1823–26)
- Second Anglo-Burmese War (1852–53)
- Third Anglo-Burmese War (1885–86)

=== Afghan wars ===
- First Anglo-Afghan War (1839–42)
- Second Anglo-Afghan War (1878–81)

=== Opium wars ===
- First Opium War (1839–43)
- Second Opium War (1856–60)

=== Sikh wars ===
- First Anglo-Sikh War (1845–46)
- Second Anglo-Sikh War (1848–49)

=== Abyssinia ===
- Expedition to Abyssinia (1867–68)

== List of presidencies and armies ==
- Bengal Presidency, the Bengal Army
- Bombay Presidency, the Bombay Army
- Madras Presidency, the Madras Army

== See also ==
- Company rule in India
