= Campaign medal =

Military decoration

A campaign medal is a military decoration which is awarded to a member of an armed force who serves in a designated military operation or performs duty in a geographical theater. Campaign medals are very similar to service medals but carry a higher status as the award usually involves deployment to a foreign region or service in a combat zone.

== History ==
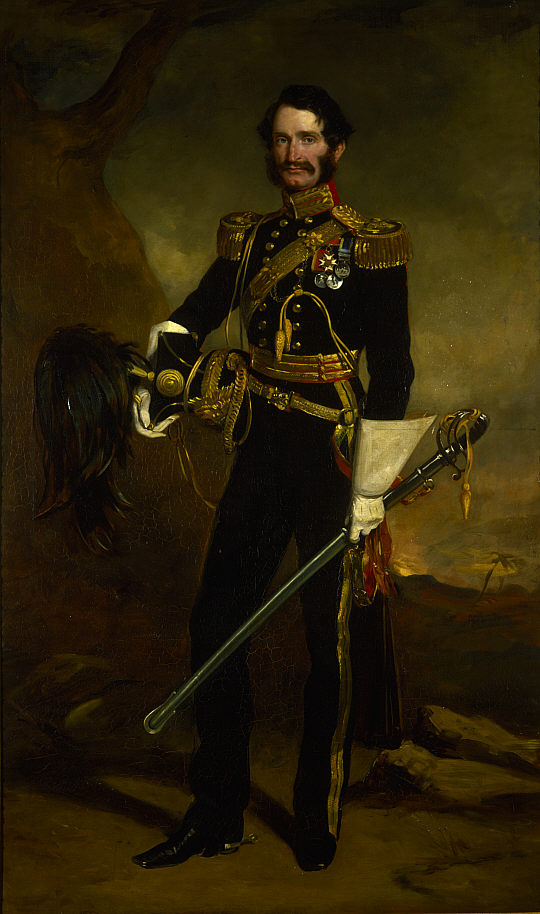
Portrait of Hope Grant, 1853. Depicted in the uniform of a Lieutenant Colonel in the British Army, Grant is shown wearing three campaign medals

Campaign medals were first invented to recognize general military service in war, in contrast to meritorious decorations which were only issued on a small scale for acts of heroism and bravery. The campaign were first issued by the British military with the medal awarded for the defeat of the Invincible Armada, with the 1815 Waterloo Medal being the first awarded to all men present and the 1847 Military General Service Medal being the first "modern" campaign medal.

== Campaign medals by country ==
- Australian campaign medals
- British campaign medals
- Canadian campaign medals
- Malaysian campaign medals
- NATO Medal refers to a number of campaign medals
- New Zealand campaign medals
- Philippines campaign medals
- Polish campaign medals
- South African campaign medals
- South Korean campaign medals
- Soviet campaign medals
- Spanish campaign medals
- Sri Lankan campaign medals
- United Nations Medal refers to a number of campaign medals
- United States campaign medals are included in Awards and decorations of the United States military

== Other campaign related items ==
- Battle honour / Campaign streamer
- Medal bar / Campaign clasp
