= United Kingdom honours order of wearing =

Positioning of the United Kingdom's Orders, Decorations and Medals

The order of wear of Orders, decorations, and medals of the United Kingdom is published by the Central Chancery of the Orders of Knighthood in the London Gazette.

== Order of wear ==
=== Victoria Cross and George Cross ===
1. Victoria Cross VC
2. George Cross GC

=== Orders ===
1. Knight/Lady Companion of the Order of the Garter KG/LG
2. Knight/Lady of the Order of the Thistle KT/LT
3. Knight of the Order of St Patrick (Note: No longer awarded/The order is now dormant) KP
4. Knight/Dame Grand Cross of the Order of the Bath GCB
5. Member of the Order of Merit OM
6. Baronet's Badge Bt/Btss (Note: The Badge is worn suspended round the neck from the riband in the same manner as the Neck Badge of an Order. It takes precedence immediately after the Badge of the Order of Merit. It is not worn in miniature and the riband is not worn with Undress Uniform)
7. Knight Grand Commander of the Order of the Star of India GCSI
8. Knight/Dame Grand Cross of the Order of St Michael and St George GCMG
9. Knight Grand Commander of the Order of the Indian Empire GCIE
10. Companion of the Order of the Crown of India CI
11. Knight/Dame Grand Cross of the Royal Victorian Order GCVO
12. Knight/Dame Grand Cross of the Order of the British Empire GBE
13. Member of the Order of the Companions of Honour CH
14. Knight/Dame Commander of the Order of the Bath KCB/DCB
15. Knight Commander of the Order of the Star of India KCSI
16. Knight/Dame Commander of the Order of St Michael and St George KCMG/DCMG
17. Knight Commander of the Order of the Indian Empire KCIE
18. Knight/Dame Commander of the Royal Victorian Order KCVO/DCVO
19. Knight/Dame Commander of the Order of the British Empire KBE/DBE
20. Knight Bachelor (Note: The Badge is worn suspended round the neck from the riband in the same manner as the neck badge of an Order. It takes precedence immediately after the Badge of a Knight Commander of the Order of the British Empire). A breast star (private purchase) may also be worn.)
21. Companion of the Order of the Bath CB
22. Companion of the Order of the Star of India CSI
23. Companion of the Order of St Michael and St George CMG
24. Companion of the Order of the Indian Empire CIE
25. Commander of the Royal Victorian Order CVO
26. Commander of the Order of the British Empire CBE
27. Companion of the Distinguished Service Order DSO
28. Lieutenant of the Royal Victorian Order LVO
29. Officer of the Order of the British Empire OBE
30. Companion of the Imperial Service Order ISO
31. Member of the Royal Victorian Order MVO
32. Member of the Order of the British Empire MBE
33. Member of the Indian Order of Merit IOM

=== Decorations ===
1. Conspicuous Gallantry Cross CGC
2. Distinguished Conduct Medal DCM
3. Conspicuous Gallantry Medal CGM
4. Conspicuous Gallantry Medal (Flying) CGM
5. George Medal GM
6. Royal West African Field Force Distinguished Conduct Medal DCM
7. King's Police Medal for Gallantry KPM
8. King's Fire Service Medal for Gallantry KFSM
9. Member of the Royal Red Cross RRC
10. Distinguished Service Cross DSC
11. Military Cross MC
12. Distinguished Flying Cross DFC
13. Air Force Cross AFC
14. Associate of the Royal Red Cross ARRC
15. Member of the Order of British India OBI
16. Kaisar-i-Hind Medal
17. Order of Saint John
18. Union of South Africa Queen's Medal for Bravery, Gold
19. Kings African Rifles Distinguished Conduct Medal DCM
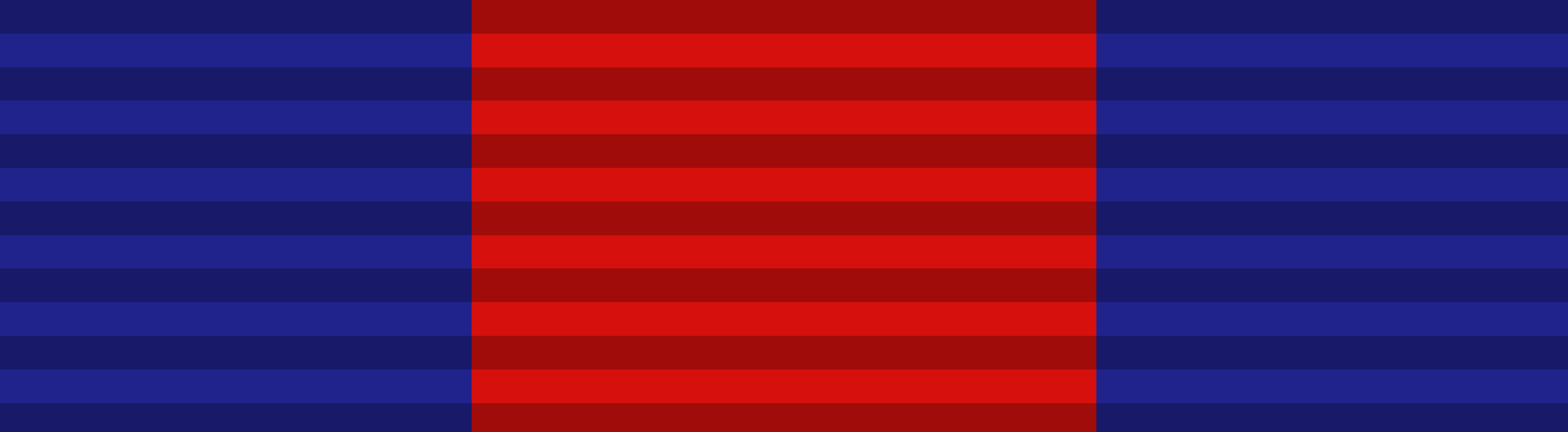
20. Indian Distinguished Service Medal IDSM
21. Union of South Africa Queen's Medal for Bravery, Silver
22. Distinguished Service Medal DSM
23. Military Medal MM
24. Distinguished Flying Medal DFM
25. Air Force Medal AFM
26. Constabulary Medal
27. Sea Gallantry Medal SGM
28. Member of the Indian Order of Merit (Civil) IOM
29. Indian Police Medal for Gallantry
30. Ceylon Police Medal for Gallantry
31. Sierra Leone Police Medal for Gallantry
32. Sierra Leone Fire Brigades Medal for Gallantry
33. Colonial Police Medal for Gallantry
34. Overseas Territories Police Medal for Gallantry
35. King's Gallantry Medal KGM
36. Royal Victorian Medal RVM
37. British Empire Medal BEM
38. King's Police Medal for Distinguished Service KPM
39. King's Fire Service Medal for Distinguished Service KFSM
40. King's Ambulance Service Medal KAM
41. King's Volunteer Reserves Medal KVRM
42. Queen's Medal for Chiefs

=== Badge of Honour ===
1. Badge of Honour

=== Campaign Medals ===
In date of campaign for which the medal was awarded. This also includes authorised United Nations Medals, European Community/Union medals, and NATO Medals.

=== Polar Medals ===
1. Polar Medal

=== Imperial Service Medal ===
1. Imperial Service Medal

=== Police medals for valuable service ===
1. Indian Police Medal For Meritorious Service
2. Ceylon Police Medal For Meritorious Service
3. Sierra Leone Police Medal for Meritorious Service
4. Sierra Leone Fire Brigades Medal for Meritorious Service
5. Colonial Police Medal for Meritorious Service
6. Overseas Territories Police Medal for Meritorious Service

=== Coronation, Jubilee and Durbar Medals ===
1. Queen Victoria Golden Jubilee Medal (1887)
2. Queen Victoria Police Golden Jubilee Medal (1887)
3. Queen Victoria Diamond Jubilee Medal (1897)
4. Queen Victoria Police Diamond Jubilee Medal (1897)
5. Visit to Ireland Medal (1900)
6. King Edward VII Coronation Medal (1902)
7. King Edward VII Police Coronation Medal (1902)
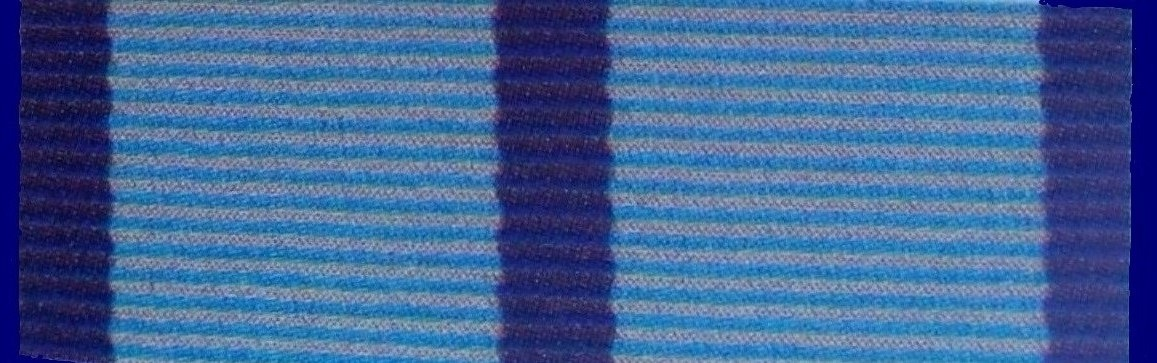
8. Delhi Durbar Medal (1903)
9. King Edward VII's Police Medal (Scotland) (1903)
10. Visit to Ireland Medal (1903)
11. King George V Coronation Medal (1911)
12. King George V Police Coronation Medal (1911)
13. Visit to Ireland Medal (1911)
14. Delhi Durbar Medal (1911)
15. King George V Silver Jubilee Medal (1935)
16. King George VI Coronation Medal (1937)
17. Queen Elizabeth II Coronation Medal (1953)
18. Queen Elizabeth II Silver Jubilee Medal (1977)
19. Queen Elizabeth II Golden Jubilee Medal (2002)
20. Queen Elizabeth II Diamond Jubilee Medal (2012)
21. Queen Elizabeth II Platinum Jubilee Medal (2022)
22. King Charles III Coronation Medal (2023)
23. Queen Victoria Long and Faithful Service Medal (1872)
24. Edward VII Long and Faithful Service Medal (1901)
25. George V Long and Faithful Service Medal (1910)
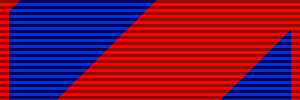
26. George VI Long and Faithful Service Medal (1936)
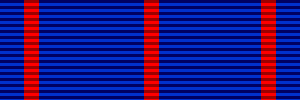
27. Elizabeth II Long and Faithful Service Medal (1952)
28. Charles III Long and Faithful Service Medal (2022)

=== Efficiency and Long Service Medals ===
1. Meritorious Service Medal
2. Accumulated Campaign Service Medal
3. Accumulated Campaign Service Medal (2011)
4. Army Long Service and Good Conduct Medal
5. Naval Long Service and Good Conduct Medal
6. Medal for Meritorious Service (Royal Navy 1918-1928)
7. Indian Long Service and Good Conduct Medal (for Europeans)
8. Indian Meritorious Service Medal (for Europeans)
9. Royal Marines Meritorious Service Medal (1849-1947)
10. Royal Air Force Meritorious Service Medal (1918-1928)
11. Royal Air Force Long Service and Good Conduct Medal
12. Medal for Long Service and Good Conduct (Ulster Defence Regiment)
13. Indian Long Service and Good Conduct Medal (for Indians)
14. Royal West African Frontier Force Long Service and Good Conduct Medal
15. Royal Sierra Leone Military Forces Long Service and Good Conduct Medal
16. King's African Rifles Long Service and Good Conduct Medal
17. Indian Meritorious Service Medal (for Indians)
18. Police Long Service and Good Conduct Medal
19. Fire and Rescue Service Long Service and Good Conduct Medal
20. African Police Medal for Meritorious Service
21. Royal Canadian Mounted Police Long Service Medal
22. Ceylon Police Long Service Medal
23. Ceylon Fire Services Long Service Medal
24. Colonial Police Long Service Medal
25. Overseas Territories Police Long Service Medal
26. Sierra Leone Police Long Service Medal
27. Sierra Leone Fire Brigades Long Service Medal
28. Mauritius Police Long Service and Good Conduct Medal
29. Mauritius Fire Services Long Service and Good Conduct Medal
30. Mauritius Prisons Service Long Service and Good Conduct Medal
31. Colonial Fire Brigades Long Service Medal
32. Overseas Territories Fire Brigades Long Service Medal
33. Colonial Prison Service Medal
34. Overseas Territories Prison Service Medal
35. Hong Kong Disciplined Services Medal
36. Emergency Reserve Decoration ERD
37. Volunteer Officers' Decoration VD
38. Volunteer Long Service Medal
39. Volunteer Officers' Decoration for India and the Colonies VD
40. Volunteer Long Service Medal for India and the Colonies
41. Colonial Auxiliary Forces Officers' Decoration VD
42. Colonial Auxiliary Forces Long Service Medal
43. Naval Good Shooting Medal
44. Militia Long Service Medal
45. Imperial Yeomanry Long Service Medal
46. Territorial Decoration TD
47. Ceylon Armed Services Long Service Medal
48. Efficiency Decoration ED
49. Territorial Efficiency Medal
50. Efficiency Medal
51. Special Reserve Long Service and Good Conduct Medal
52. Decoration for Officers of the Royal Naval Reserve RD
53. Decoration for Officers of the Royal Naval Volunteer Reserve VRD
54. Royal Naval Reserve Long Service Medal
55. Royal Naval Volunteer Reserve Long Service Medal
56. Royal Naval Auxiliary Sick Berth Reserve Long Service Medal;
57. Royal Fleet Reserve Long Service and Good Conduct Medal
58. Royal Naval Wireless Auxiliary Reserve Long Service Medal
59. Royal Naval Auxiliary Service Long Service Medal
60. Air Efficiency Award AE
61. Volunteer Reserves Service Medal
62. Ulster Defence Regiment Medal UD
63. Northern Ireland Home Service Medal
64. Queen's Medal for Champion Shots of the Royal Navy and Royal Marines
65. Queen's Medal for Champion Shots of the New Zealand Naval Forces
66. Queen's Medal for Champion Shots in the Military Forces
67. Queen's Medal for Champion Shots of the Air Forces
68. Cadet Forces Medal
69. H.M. Coastguard Long Service and Good Conduct Medal
70. Special Constabulary Long Service Medal
71. Canadian Forces' Decoration CD
72. Royal Observer Corps Medal
73. Civil Defence Long Service Medal
74. Ambulance Service (Emergency Duties) Long Service and Good Conduct Medal
75. Royal Fleet Auxiliary Service Medal
76. Prison Services (Operational Duties) Long Service and Good Conduct Medal
77. Jersey Honorary Police Long Service and Good Conduct Medal
78. Merchant Navy Medal for Meritorious Service MNM
79. Ebola Medal for Service in West Africa
80. National Crime Agency Long Service and Good Conduct Medal
81. Rhodesia Medal
82. Royal Ulster Constabulary Service Medal
83. Northern Ireland Prison Service Medal
84. Union of South Africa Commemoration Medal
85. Indian Independence Medal
86. Pakistan Independence Medal
87. Ceylon Armed Services Inauguration Medal
88. Ceylon Police Independence Medal
89. Sierra Leone Independence Medal
90. Jamaica Independence Medal
91. Uganda Independence Medal
92. Malawi Independence Medal
93. Fiji Independence Medal
94. Papua New Guinea Independence Medal
95. Solomon Islands Independence Medal
96. Service Medal of the Order of St John
97. Badge of the Order of the League of Mercy
98. Voluntary Medical Service Medal
99. Women's Royal Voluntary Service Medal
100. South African Medal for War Services
101. Colonial Special Constabulary Medal

=== Others ===
1. Commonwealth realms' orders, decorations and medals (in date of award and if authorised to be accepted and worn)
2. Other Commonwealth members' orders, decorations and medals (in date of award and if authorised to be accepted and worn)
3. Foreign orders, decorations and medals (in date of award and if authorised to be accepted and worn)

== See also ==
- British nobility
- Post-nominal letters
- Australian honours order of wearing
- Canadian honours order of wearing
- New Zealand honours order of wearing
