= Medals of Sierra Leone (1961–1971) =

A number of new Sierra Leonean medals were instituted in the decade from 1961, when the country gained independence, until 1971, when Sierra Leone was declared a republic.

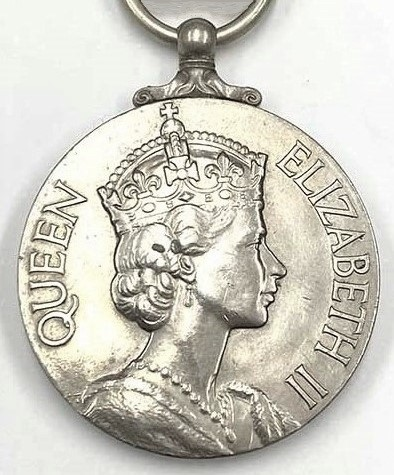
Cecil Thomas's obverse, approved for all awards except the Military Long Service Medal

== Background ==
On 27 April 1961, Sierra Leone, until then a British colony, became an independent Dominion within the Commonwealth, retaining Queen Elizabeth II as Head of State, with the title Queen of Sierra Leone. This status continued until 19 April 1971 when the country became a republic within the Commonwealth.

In the decade after 1961, Sierra Leone instituted a number of new awards, including replacements for former colonial versions. In addition, the Prime Minister of Sierra Leone was able to recommend his country's citizens for appointment to British orders, including the Order of the British Empire. The Sierra Leonean honours system changed again when the country became a republic in 1971, with existing awards replaced and, in 1972, the creation of two orders – the Order of the Republic and the Order of the Rokel.

== Awards instituted by the Dominion of Sierra Leone ==
All the medals below were instituted by Royal Warrant and appear on the British Order of wear. All were manufactured by the British Royal Mint.

=== On independence ===
==== Sierra Leone Independence Medal ====
Independence Medal

Established in 1961 on the occasion of the country's independence. The 32mm wide circular cupronickel medal bears the Queen's effigy and the inscription 'QUEEN ELIZABETH II' on the obverse. The reverse has the Coat of arms of Sierra Leone surrounded by the words 'SIERRA LEONE INDEPENDENCE. 27th APRIL 1961'. It was awarded to members of the Sierra Leone police and armed forces serving on 27 April 1961, including seconded British personnel. 5,500 medals were supplied by the Royal Mint.

=== Armed forces ===
==== Sierra Leone General Service Medal ====
Sierra Leone General Service Medal

Established in 1961. The 32mm wide circular bronze medal bears the Queen's effigy and the inscription 'QUEEN ELIZABETH II' on the obverse. The reverse has the Coat of arms of Sierra Leone surrounded by the words 'FOR GENERAL SERVICE. SIERRA LEONE'. It was awarded with a ribbon clasp inscribed 'CONGO' to members of the Sierra Leone armed forces who served during the Congo Crisis of 1962–63. Seconded British forces qualified if they received no other medal for the same service. 500 medals were supplied by the Royal Mint.

==== Royal Sierra Leone Military Forces Long Service and Good Conduct Medal ====
Military Long Service & Good Conduct Medal

Established in 1962, this medal replaced the Royal West African Frontier Force Long Service and Good Conduct Medal. It is a circular silver medal bearing the effigy of the Queen on the obverse with the inscription 'ELIZABETH II DEI GRATIA REGINA F.D'. The reverse is inscribed ''FOR LONG SERVICE AND GOOD CONDUCT'' over four lines with the words ''ROYAL SIERRA LEONE MILITARY FORCES'' around the circumference. It was awarded to NCOs and men who had completed 16 years exemplary service, including service in the earlier Royal West African Frontier Force. 169 awards were made up to 1971.

=== Police and fire brigades ===
These medals, six in all, were direct replacements for the previous colonial-era awards. They generally carried over the previous rules and regulations, including the 18 years qualification period for the long service medals.

Although the relevant Royal Warrants were drafted on 20 August 1964, there were protracted negotiations between the Sierra Leonean government and the Royal Mint caused by discussion on the precise specification and design of the medals, and by the country's political situation which meant that the awards were a low priority.

Eventually, in March 1970, supplies of the ribbons were delivered to the Sierra Leonean authorities. Later the same year, the first names of nominated recipients were submitted to the Royal Mint, and by early 1971 a total of 17 Police Meritorious Service Medals and 94 Police Long Service Medals, impressed on the edge with the recipient's details, had been sent and distributed. In addition, four ribbon clasps were supplied to reflect further police service. These were the only medals supplied.

In April 1971 Sierra Leone became a republic and the awarding of these medals was discontinued, no awards having been made for the police gallantry medal, or for any of the fire service medals.

==== Sierra Leone police medals ====
Police medals for Gallantry and Meritorious Service

Police Long Service Medal

There were three medal types:

- Sierra Leone Police Medal for Gallantry, which replaced the Colonial Police Medal for Gallantry
- Sierra Leone Police Medal for Meritorious Service, which replaced the Colonial Police Medal for Meritorious Service
- Sierra Leone Police Long Service Medal, which replaced the Colonial Police Long Service Medal

The medals' design showed the Queen's effigy and the inscription 'QUEEN ELIZABETH II' on the obverse. The reverse depicted the scales of justice above a vertical truncheon, with the words 'SIERRA LEONE POLICE FORCE' above, and 'FOR GALLANTRY, FOR MERITORIOUS SERVICE' or 'FOR LONG SERVICE' below, as appropriate.

==== Sierra Leone fire brigades medals ====
Fire Brigades medals for Gallantry and Meritorious Service

Fire Brigades Long Service Medal

There were three medal types:

- Sierra Leone Fire Brigades Medal for Gallantry, which replaced the Colonial Police Medal for Gallantry (Fire Brigades version)
- Sierra Leone Fire Brigades Medal for Meritorious Service, which replaced the Colonial Police Medal for Meritorious Service (Fire Brigades version)
- Sierra Leone Fire Brigades Long Service Medal, which replaced the Colonial Fire Brigades Long Service Medal

Although no Fire Brigade medals were finally awarded, the medals designs were approved. These showed the Queen's effigy and the inscription 'QUEEN ELIZABETH II' on the obverse. The reverse had a firefighter's helmet and axe superimposed on a laurel wreath, following the former colonial design. Inscribed around the edge are the words 'SIERRA LEONE FIRE BRIGADES' above, with either 'FOR GALLANTRY, FOR MERITORIOUS SERVICE' or 'FOR LONG SERVICE' below, as appropriate.

== See also ==
- Orders, decorations, and medals of Sierra Leone – medals of the Republic of Sierra Leone
