= Indian Meritorious Service Medal =

The Indian Meritorious Service Medal refers to one of two different awards:

- Indian Meritorious Service Medal (for Europeans of Indian Army), established by the East India Company in 1848 for European non-commissioned officers in service to the company army. Later awarded to European non-commissioned officers in service to British Indian Army until 1873.
- Indian Meritorious Service Medal (for Indian Army), established in 1888 by the British Raj for award to native Indian non-commissioned officers serving in the Indian Army.
