= William Leycester Rouse Carbonell =

British senior police officer in Malay (1912-1993)

William Leycester Rouse Carbonell CMG

Commissioner of Police, Malaya
- In office 1954–1958
- Preceded by: A. E. Young
- Succeeded by: C. H. Fenner

Personal details
- Born: 14 August 1912
- Died: 30 September 1993 (aged 81) Frimley
- Spouse: Elsa Agnes Dargen Curdie
- Children: 2 sons
- Occupation: Senior colonial police officer

William Leycester Rouse Carbonell CMG (14 August 1912 – 30 September 1993) was a senior British colonial police officer who served as Commissioner of Police in the Federation of Malaya from 1954 to 1958.

== Early life and education ==
William Leycester Rouse Carbonell, born on 14 August 1912 in Battersea, London, was the fourth of five children of John Carbonell, who worked in the motor trade, and his wife Barbara Honor. He was educated at Shrewsbury School and St Catharine's College, Cambridge, where he received his BA degree in anthropology in 1931.

== Career ==
In 1934, after being offered a position in the Malaya police, and studying Malay at the School of Oriental and African Studies, London, he went to Kuala Lumpur as a police probationer, and trained in the police academy. He then served as a police officer in Selangor, Perak, Pahang and Johore, rising to the rank of Assistant Commissioner of Police of the Federated Malay States in 1937. In 1942, he was imprisoned for over three years by the Japanese army as a POW in Changi Jail, and later at Sime Road Camp, Singapore.

In 1946, after staying in Australia, he returned to Malaya and rejoined the police force where the country soon faced growing attacks from Communist guerrillas in what became known as the Malayan Emergency. By 1949, he had been promoted to Superintendent and was leading armed sorties into the jungle against the insurgents.

In 1952, while assistant commissioner in Kelantan, he was transferred to Kuala Lumpur as senior commissioner to head the newly formed special branch responsible for intelligence gathering and armed missions. In recognition of his services, he was awarded the King's Police Medal, and the Colonial Service Medal. His rapid promotion continued when, in 1954, he was hand-picked by General Sir Gerald Templer, High Commissioner and Director of Operations in Malaya, to head the police force as Commissioner of Police.

While serving as Commissioner of Police he was credited with modernising and strengthening the force, and was recognised as having made a significant contribution during the Malayan Emergency to the eventual defeat of the insurgents. He oversaw the celebrations of the independence of the Federation of Malaya on 31 August 1957, describing them as "Not a bad start for a new nation". Shortly before retiring in 1958, he was awarded the Paglima Mangku Negara.

On his return to England, Carbonell worked as a business consultant. He retired in the 1960s, and died in Frimley, Surrey on 30 September 1993.

== Personal life ==
In 1937, Carbonell married Elsa Agnes Dargen Curdie, an Australian nurse who treated him in hospital, and they had two sons.

== Honours ==
Carbonell was appointed Companion of the Order of St Michael and St George (CMG) in the 1956 New Year's Honours.
