= List of post-nominal letters (Mauritius) =

Post-nominal letters in Mauritius include the following. Mauritians received British honours until the 1992 New Year Honours, which also included knighthoods. Mauritius became a republic on 12 March 1992.

Office	Post-nominal
Grand Commander of the Star and Key of the Indian Ocean	GCSK
Grand Officer of the Star and Key of the Indian Ocean	GOSK
Commander of the Star and Key of the Indian Ocean	CSK
Officer of the Star and Key of the Indian Ocean	OSK
Member of the Star and Key of the Indian Ocean	MSK
Companions of the President's Distinguished Service Medal	PDSM
Companions of the President's Meritorious Service Medal	PMSM
Companions of the President's Badge of Honour	PBH
Companions of the President's Certificate of Honour	PCH
President's Long Service and Good Conduct Medal	PLSG
Mauritius Police Medal for Meritorious Service (1968–1992) (Dominion of Mauritius	MPM
Senior Counsel	SC (since 1992) - replaces Queen's (or King's Counsel).
School Certificate holder	SC
Higher School Certificate	HSC
British honours
Knight/Dame Grand Cross of the Order of St Michael and St George	GCMG
Knight/Dame Commander of the Order of St Michael and St George	KCMG
Companions of the Order of St Michael and St George	CMG
Knight Bachelor	Kt

== See also ==
- Lists of post-nominal letters
