= Michael B. Nsimbi =

Dr. Michael Bazzebulala Nsimbi, MBE (March 10, 1910 – March 5, 1994) was a Ugandan teacher, poet who was considered the Father of Ganda literature, was a pioneer of Luganda language, culture and written forms.

== Early life and education ==
Born in Masaka, he was educated at St. Henry's College, Kitovu, and St. Mary's College, Kisubi, and later Makerere University, where he qualified as a teacher.

== Career ==
In the 1940s, Nsimbi produced Ennono z’Abaganda (The Origins of Baganda), a foundational work in the development of Luganda orthography and historiography. He established the Luganda Society in 1950 to preserve, popularise and promote the use of Luganda among both Baganda and non-Baganda, and worked with J. D. Chesswas to produce text books for courses in the Luganda language. Chairman of the society from 1963 to 1987, Nsimbi was a driving force, together with Dr Livingstone Walusimbi, in establishing a Luganda-language curriculum for the first time at Makerere University in 1976, the country's only university at the time. As a result, a high school curriculum was introduced in 1979, and a curriculum for the National Teachers' Colleges in 1984. In 1989 he was awarded an honorary doctoral degree (Doctor of Letters, Honoris Causa) from Makerere.

Nsimbi also encouraged the revival of other local languages and cultures in the nation of Uganda. He was made an MBE in 1960, and was awarded the Uganda Independence Medal in 1963. He died on March 5, 1994, and the same year was honoured with the creation of the Dr. Nsimbi Scholarship Scheme in honour of his work in promoting Luganda language and culture.

== Works ==
- ennono z’Abaganda (The Origins of Baganda)
- Olulimi Oluganda
- An explanation of the Standard Orthography of Luganda (1958, 1963), with J. D. Chesswas
- The Kagenda series: Kitagenda ne Kagenda, Kagenda ne Banne, Kagenda ne banne bakola ki?
- Omweso Mu Uganda (Omweso, a Game People Play in Uganda) (1969)
- Luganda Names, Clans and Totems (1980)
- Njize Okusoma Kato Ne Nnakku Ekitabo (1990), with J. D. Chesswas
- Siwa Muto Lugero (1990)
- Amannya Amaganda N'Ennono Zaago (1990)

works published pseudonymously as Binsangawano:

- Bonna Baasumagira?
- Bwali butamanya.
