= Mauritius Police Long Service and Good Conduct Medal =

Awards of the colony and dominion of Mauritius

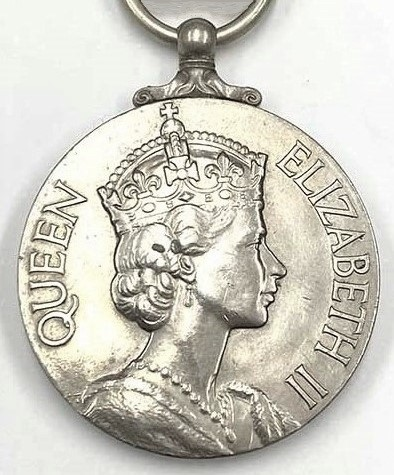
- Obverse of medal
- Awarded for: 18 years service
- Country: Dominion of Mauritius
- Eligibility: Members of the Mauritius police
- Clasps: 25 years 30 years
- Status: No longer awarded
- Established: 1968
- Final award: 1992
- Ribbon of the long service medal

Order of Wear
- Next (higher): Sierra Leone Fire Brigades Long Service Medal
- Next (lower): Mauritius Fire Services Long Service and Good Conduct Medal

The Mauritius Police Long Service and Good Conduct Medal was awarded by the Dominion of Mauritius between 1968 and 1992 to members of the Mauritius Police who completed eighteen years service.

== Establishment ==
On 12 March 1968 Mauritius, until then a British colony, became an independent Dominion within the Commonwealth, retaining Queen Elizabeth II as Head of State with the title Queen of Mauritius. This constitutional change required the replacement of a number of colonial era awards, including the Colonial Police Long Service Medal which, by a Royal Warrant, was replaced by the Mauritius Police Long Service and Good Conduct Medal. The award became defunct when Mauritius became a republic within the Commonwealth on 12 March 1992.

The medal, which is worn after coronation and jubilee medals, appears in the British order of wear.

== Description ==
The medal is circular, silver, and 36 mm (1.4 in) in diameter. The obverse has the Queen's effigy, designed by Cecil Thomas, with the inscription 'QUEEN ELIZABETH II'. The reverse is similar to the earlier Colonial Police Long Service Medal, and depicts a police officer's truncheon superimposed on a laurel wreath. Around the central design are the words 'FOR LONG SERVICE AND GOOD CONDUCT' and 'MAURITIUS POLICE FORCE'. The ribbon is blue with two broad red stripes, and is worn from a ring suspender. Each medal was inscribed with the recipient's details on the edge.

It was manufactured by the British Royal Mint.

== Award criteria ==
The medal was awarded to members of the Mauritius Police who completed eighteen years service. This could include service prior to independence. Clasps were granted for twenty-five and thirty years service. In undress, when only ribbons are worn, these clasps are represented by silver rosettes attached to the ribbon.

== Other Mauritius police medals ==
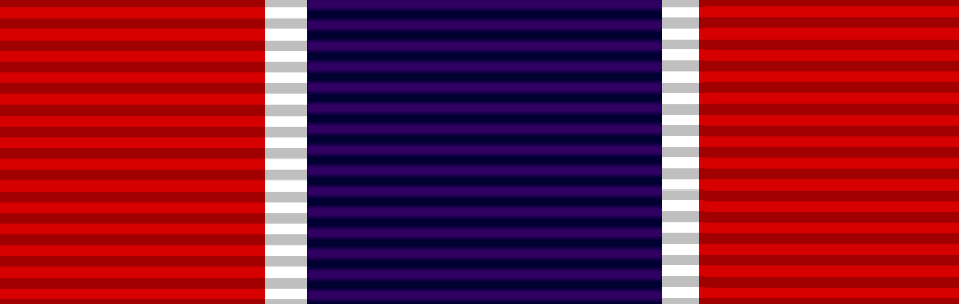
Mauritius Police Medal for Meritorious Service

A Police Good Conduct Medal, locally authorised and produced, was awarded from 1872 by the governor of the British colony of Mauritius, until it was superseded by the Colonial Police Long Service Medal in 1934. It was awarded to members of the colony's police force in either bronze or silver, depending on length of service. The medal is oval, with the obverse depicting two crossed tipstaffs surmounted by a Victorian crown, with a scroll below bearing the motto 'PAX NOBISCUM' (peace with us). The whole is surrounded by a narrow border bearing the inscription 'POLICE DEPARTMENT' at the top, and 'MAURITIUS' below. The reverse shows a palm wreath surrounding the inscription 'FOR GOOD CONDUCT.'

The Police Medal for Meritorious Service was awarded by the Dominion of Mauritius between 1968 and 1992, the same period as the dominion's Police Long Service and Good Conduct Medal. It has the same obverse as the long service medal, while the reverse shows crossed tipstaffs upon a laurel wreath, surrounded by the words 'MAURITIUS POLICE FORCE. FOR MERITORIOUS SERVICE.' The ribbon is red, with a broad central blue stripe, flanked each side by a narrow white stripe. 97 were awarded, with recipients entitled to the post-nominal letters 'MPM'.

== See also ==
- Mauritius Fire Services Long Service and Good Conduct Medal
- Mauritius Prisons Service Long Service and Good Conduct Medal
