= Mauritius Fire Services Long Service and Good Conduct Medal =

Medal awarded by Dominion of Mauritius

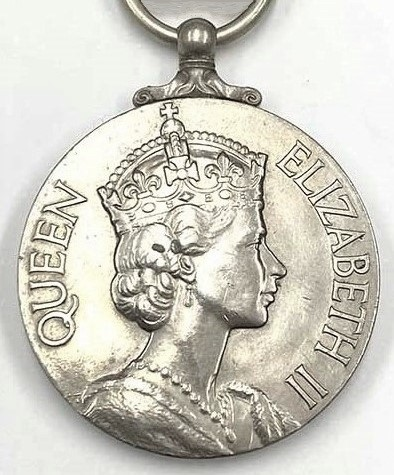
- Obverse of medal
- Awarded for: 18 years service
- Country: Dominion of Mauritius
- Eligibility: Members of the Mauritius fire services
- Clasps: 25 years 30 years
- Status: No longer awarded
- Established: 1968
- Final award: 1992
- Ribbon of the medal

Order of Wear
- Next (higher): Mauritius Police Long Service and Good Conduct Medal
- Next (lower): Mauritius Prisons Service Long Service and Good Conduct Medal

The Mauritius Fire Services Long Service and Good Conduct Medal was awarded between 1968 and 1992 by the Dominion of Mauritius to members of local fire services.

== Establishment ==
On 12 March 1968 Mauritius, until then a British colony, became an independent Dominion within the Commonwealth, retaining Queen Elizabeth II as Head of State with the title Queen of Mauritius. This constitutional change required the replacement of a number of colonial era awards, including the Colonial Fire Brigades Long Service Medal which, by a Royal Warrant, was replaced by the Mauritius Fire Services Long Service and Good Conduct Medal. The award became defunct when Mauritius became a republic within the Commonwealth on 12 March 1992.

The medal, which is worn after coronation and jubilee medals, appears in the British order of wear.

== Description ==
The medal is circular, silver, and 36 mm (1.4 in) in diameter. The obverse has the Queen's effigy, designed by Cecil Thomas, with the inscription 'QUEEN ELIZABETH II'. The reverse is similar to the earlier Colonial Fire Brigades Long Service Medal, and depicts a firefighter's helmet and fire axe superimposed on a laurel wreath. Around the central design are the words 'FOR LONG SERVICE AND GOOD CONDUCT • MAURITIUS FIRE BRIGADES'. The ribbon is red with a central black stripe and is worn from a ring suspender. Each medal was inscribed with the recipient's details on the edge.

It was manufactured by the British Royal Mint.

== Award criteria ==
The medal was awarded to members of the Mauritius Government Fire Service and the fire brigades of the City of Port Louis and Department of Civil Aviation, who completed eighteen years whole or aggregated service. This could include service prior to independence. Clasps were granted for twenty-five and thirty years service. In undress, when only ribbons are worn, these clasps are represented by silver rosettes attached to the ribbon.

== See also ==
- Police Long Service and Good Conduct Medal
- Mauritius Prisons Service Long Service and Good Conduct Medal
