= Mauritius Prisons Service Long Service and Good Conduct Medal =

Medal awarded by Dominion of Mauritius

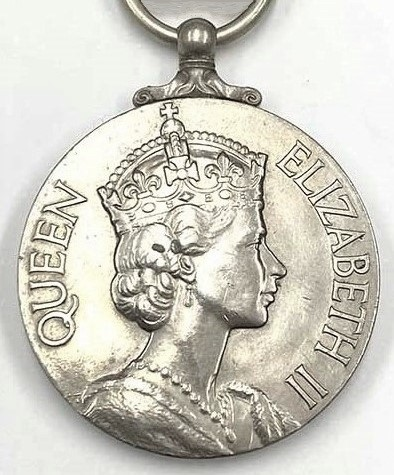
- Obverse of medal
- Awarded for: 18 years service
- Country: Dominion of Mauritius
- Eligibility: Members of the Mauritius prisons services
- Clasps: 25 years 30 years
- Status: No longer awarded
- Established: 1968
- Final award: 1992
- Ribbon of the medal

Order of Wear
- Next (higher): Mauritius Fire Services Long Service and Good Conduct Medal
- Next (lower): Colonial Fire Brigades Long Service Medal

The Mauritius Prisons Service Long Service and Good Conduct Medal was awarded by the Dominion of Mauritius between 1968 and 1992 to staff of the Mauritius Prisons Service who completed eighteen years service.

== Establishment ==
On 12 March 1968 Mauritius, until then a British colony, became an independent Dominion within the Commonwealth, retaining Queen Elizabeth II as Head of State with the title Queen of Mauritius. This constitutional change required the replacement of a number of colonial era awards, including the Colonial Prison Service Medal which, by a Royal Warrant, was replaced by the Mauritius Prisons Service Long Service and Good Conduct Medal. The award became defunct when Mauritius became a republic within the Commonwealth on 12 March 1992.

The medal, which is worn after coronation and jubilee medals, appears in the British order of wear.

== Description ==
The medal is circular, silver, and 36 mm (1.4 in) in diameter. The obverse has the Queen's effigy, designed by Cecil Thomas, with the inscription 'QUEEN ELIZABETH II'. The reverse is similar to the earlier Colonial Prison Service Medal, and shows a phoenix rising out of flames and flying upwards toward the sun. Above are the words, MAURITIUS PRISON SERVICE and below FOR LONG SERVICE & GOOD CONDUCT. The ribbon is red with a central white stripe and is worn from a ring suspender. Each medal was inscribed with the recipient's details on the edge.

It was manufactured by the British Royal Mint.

== Award criteria ==
The medal was awarded to staff of the Mauritius Prisons Service who completed eighteen years service. Previous service in a colonial prison service could count. Clasps were granted for twenty-five and thirty years service. In undress, when only ribbons are worn, these clasps are represented by silver rosettes attached to the ribbon.

== See also ==
- Mauritius Police Long Service and Good Conduct Medal
- Mauritius Fire Services Long Service and Good Conduct Medal
