= Luganda Society =

The Luganda Society is a non-governmental organization dedicated to the teaching and promotion of the Luganda language.

== Founding ==
The Luganda Society was established in 1950 through the efforts of Michael B. Nsimbi, known as “The Father of Ganda literature.” Observing the detrimental effects of colonialism on Uganda society and culture, and the neglect and loss of local customs, language and culture, Nsimbi joined with other likeminded nationals to form the society, with the key goals of preserving, popularising and promoting the use of Luganda to both Baganda and non-Baganda.

== Society Aims ==
Since its establishment the specific aims of the Society have been:

- To promote proper use of the Luganda language and popularize Luganda literature
- To promote proper Luganda orthography among both Baganda and non-Baganda
- To promote research about Luganda words and idioms
- To encourage translation of foreign language literature into Luganda
- To organize Luganda language courses and competitions in schools
- To organize festivals highlighting the local language and culture through music and drama

== Achievements ==
The Luganda Society became a catalyst for inspiring and resourcing a number of writers in the Luganda language, including Solomon Mpalanyi, Phoebe Mukasa, Hugo Ssematimba, C. Kalinda, Dr. Livingstone Walusimbi

and Michael B. Nsimbi himself. In 1958 the society began a regular program on Radio Uganda to promote teaching and learning of Luganda and various aspects of Buganda's culture, and organise on-air Luganda language competitions. In 1959 the society began organising competitions in schools, and in 1965 began offering scholarships to the best students in Luganda, known today as the Dr. Nsimbi Scholarship Scheme. In 1963 the society organized the first Pageant of Uganda, a cultural festival held at Uganda's National Theater in Kampala, highlighting Uganda's many cultures.

The Society eventually gained government recognition for their cause, and from the 1970s worked together to produce a Luganda language curriculum at Makerere University, the country's only university at the time, in 1976. Nsimbi and fellow Society member Dr. Livingstone Walusimbi were instrumental in this process, which also saw the creation of a high school curriculum in 1979, and a curriculum for the National Teachers' Colleges in 1984. The Society also worked to establish the Luganda Teachers Association in 1988, and a curriculum for Teacher Training Colleges in 1994.

== Chairpersons of Luganda Society ==
- Prince Earnest Kayima Mpadwa, 1950 - 1953 (Ssaabalangira at the time)
- J.S. Kasirye, 1953 - 1953
- Princess Irene Ndagire, 1953 - 1963 (Nnaalinya at the time)
- Dr. Michael B. Nsimbi, 1963 - 1987
- Dr. Livingstone Walusimbi, 1987 -
- Mr. Arthur Bagunywa -
