= J. D. Chesswas =

John Douglas Chesswas MBE (1919 – 28 February 2009) was a British author, linguist and policy advisor in Uganda. He was regarded as a pioneer in the development of the writing of the Luganda language, and held prominent positions in the Ugandan colonial government of the day. He also worked as a leading educational evaluation theorist for programmes in the developing world. Chesswas was awarded an MBE in the 1965 New Year Honours.

Chesswas was born in 1919. He served in Indian Army Pioneer Corps during World War II and was promoted from a private soldier to 2nd lieutenant in January 1941. He died in Wiltshire, England in February 2009.

== Orthography of Luganda ==
Chesswas was the author of "The Essentials of Luganda" (1954); the third (1963) and fourth (1967) editions of which are commonly used as a textbook for courses in Luganda language.

Chesswas was employed by the Luganda Language Board as a teacher of Luganda when, in 1949, the Government for the Uganda Protectorate began to offer free courses in Luganda to any officer wishing to take up the study. Recognising the lack of teachers in the language, Chesswas took the opportunity to publish a textbook for stations where no teachers of the language were available. Chesswas cites Sir Apolo Kagwa's Engero z’Abaganda and Michael B. Nsimbi's Olulimi Olugand as his major sources, and acknowledges Nsimbi as his primary aid in developing the text.

With Nsimbi, Chesswas went on to produce An explanation of the Standard Orthography of Luganda; first written for The Eagle Press in 1958, and published as a book in 1963, with second, third and fourth (1985) editions.

== Educational evaluation ==
Chesswas spent 19 years in the education service of Uganda, predominantly as Provincial Education Officer of Buganda, and then as Officer in Charge of the Educational Planning Unit within the Ministry of Education. He was subsequently appointed to UNESCO on the staff of the International Institute of Educational Planners, where, as a theorist in the field of educational evaluation, he authored a number of important books and articles, collaborating with other notable theorists such as Raymond Lyons, Jacques Hallak and John Vaizey.

== List of works ==
Chesswas's works include:

- Changing the existing educational system: some basic implications for the educational planner (1966)
- Educational planning and development in Uganda (1966)
- Productivity and the teacher (1967)
- Educational structures in English-speaking developing countries in Africa (1967)
- The Costing of educational plans (1967), with John Vaizey
- Methodologies of educational planning for developing countries (1968)
- Are there really too many teachers? (1970)
- Planning and implementation of educational development within governmental and educational administration: Uganda (1970)
- Tanzania: factors influencing change in teachers' basic salaries (1972)
- Uganda: behaviour of non-teacher recurring expenditure (1972), with Jacques Hallak
- Educational development: Pakistan (1974)
- Planning the distribution of primary educational services: Trinidad and Tobago - (mission) 10–21 March 1975
- Prospects for educational development: Barbados - (mission) (1977), with Everard, Kimmins & Taylor
