= Order of Merit =

Dynastic order recognising distinguished service with the Commonwealth

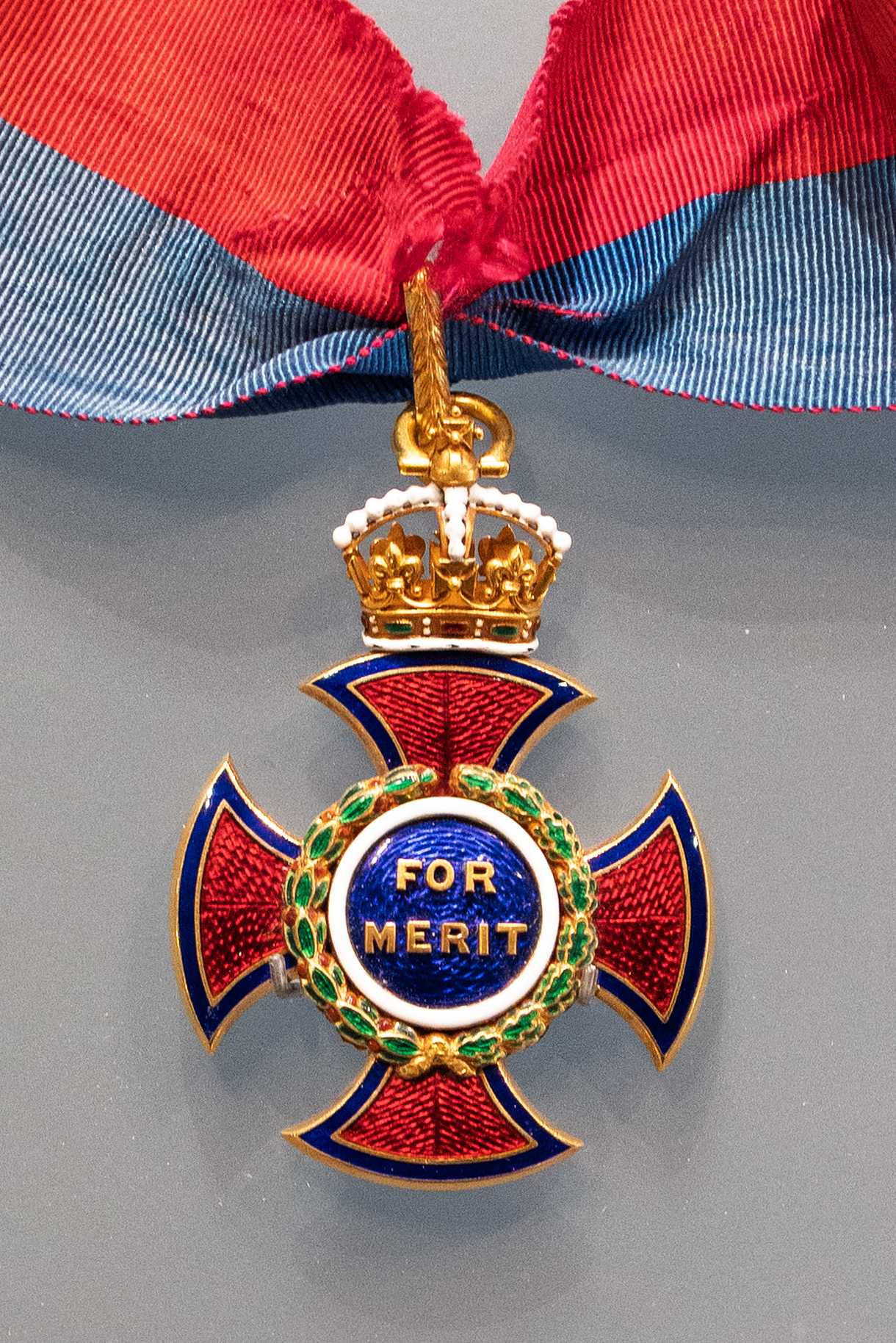
- Order of Merit badge issued to Florence Nightingale

Awarded by Charles III
- Type: Order of merit
- Established: 26 June 1902
- Motto: For Merit
- Eligibility: All living citizens of the Commonwealth realms
- Criteria: At the monarch's pleasure
- Founder: Edward VII
- Sovereign: Charles III
- Secretary and Registrar: Robin Janvrin, Baron Janvrin
- Grades: Member (OM)

Precedence
- Next (higher): Dependent on state
- Next (lower): Dependent on state
- Ribbon bar of the order

The Order of Merit (French: Ordre du Mérite) (Note: For use in Canada, in accordance with the country's policy of official bilingualism.) is an order of merit for the Commonwealth realms, recognising distinguished service in the armed forces, science, art, literature, or the promotion of culture. Established in 1902 by Edward VII, admission into the order remains the personal gift of its Sovereign—currently Edward VII's great-great-grandson Charles III—and is restricted to a maximum of 24 living recipients from the Commonwealth realms, plus honorary members. While all members are entitled to use the post-nominal letters OM and wear the badge of the order, the Order of Merit's precedence among other honours differs among countries.

== History ==
In around 1773, George III considered establishing an order of knighthood to be called the "Order of Minerva" with membership restricted to 24 distinguished artists and authors. Knights would be entitled to the post-nominal letters KM, and would wear a silver nine-pointed breast star with the image of Minerva at its centre, along with a "straw-coloured" sash worn across the chest from the right shoulder. The motto of the Order would be "Omnia posthabita scientiae" (in Latin, "Everything comes after knowledge"). Once the King's proposal was made public, however, arguments within intellectual circles over who would be most deserving of the new order grew so heated that George ultimately dropped the idea, though he briefly reconsidered it in 1789; on 6 February of that year, he revised the design of the order, with the breast star to have sixteen points, the motto to be the Latin for "Learning improves character" and with membership to include distinguished scientists. Following the Battle of Trafalgar in 1805, First Lord of the Admiralty Charles Middleton, 1st Baron Barham and William Pitt exchanged correspondence concerning the possible creation of an order of merit, though nothing came of the idea.

Later, Queen Victoria, her courtiers, and politicians alike, thought that a new order, based on the Prussian order Pour le Mérite, would make up for the insufficient recognition offered by the established honours system to achievement outside public service, in fields such as art, music, literature, industry and science. Victoria's husband, Albert, Prince Consort, took an interest in the matter; it was recorded in his diary that he met Sir Robert Peel on 16 January 1844 to discuss the "idea of institution of a civil Order of Merit" and, three days later, he conferred with the Queen on the subject.

Though nothing came of the idea at the time, the concept did not wither and, more than 40 years later, on 5 January 1888, Prime Minister Robert Gascoyne-Cecil, 3rd Marquess of Salisbury submitted to the by then long-widowed Queen a draft constitution for an Order of Merit in Science and Art, consisting of one grade split into two branches of knighthood: the Order of Scientific Merit, for Knights of Merit in Science, with the post-nominal letters KMS, and the Order of Artistic Merit, for Knights of Merit in Art, with the post-nominal letters KMA. However, Frederic Leighton, President of the Royal Academy of Arts, advised against the new order, primarily because of its selection process.

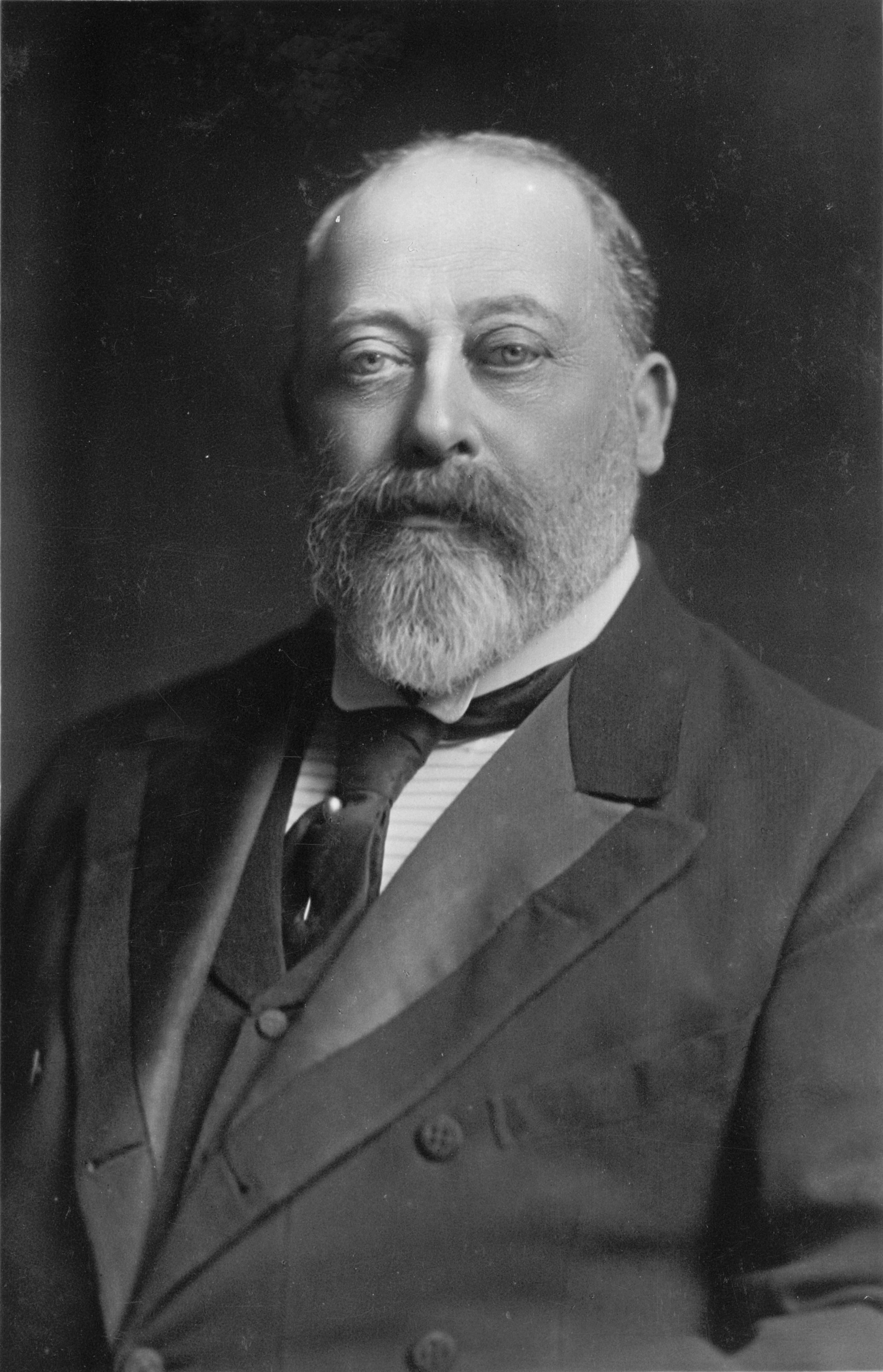
King Edward VII, founder of the Order of Merit

It was Victoria's son Edward VII who eventually founded the Order of Merit on 26 June 1902 (the date for which his coronation had been originally scheduled) as a means to acknowledge "exceptionally meritorious service in Our Navy and Our Army, or who may have rendered exceptionally meritorious service towards the advancement of Art, Literature and Science". All modern aspects of the order were established under his direction, including the division for military figures.

From the outset, prime ministers attempted to propose candidates or lobbied to influence the monarch's decision on appointments. But, the Royal Household adamantly guarded information about potential names. After 1931, when the Statute of Westminster came into effect and the Dominions of the British Empire became independent countries within the empire, equal in status to the UK, the Order of Merit continued as an honour open to all these realms and, in many, became a part of their newly developing national honours systems. The order's statutes were amended in 1935 to include members of the Royal Air Force and, in 1969, the definition of honorary recipients was expanded to include members of the Commonwealth of Nations that are not realms.

The order has always been open to women, Florence Nightingale being the first woman to receive the honour, in 1907. Several individuals have refused admission into the Order of Merit, including Rudyard Kipling, A. E. Housman, and George Bernard Shaw. Prince Philip, Duke of Edinburgh, remains the youngest person ever inducted into the Order, having been admitted by Queen Elizabeth II in 1968, when he was 47 years old.

Robin Eames, Baron Eames, represented the order at the coronation of Charles III and Camilla on 6 May 2023.

== Eligibility and appointment ==
All citizens of the Commonwealth realms are eligible for appointment to the Order of Merit. There may be, however, only 24 living individuals in the order at any given time, not including honorary appointees, and new members are personally selected by the reigning monarch of the realms, Charles III, with the assistance of his private secretaries; the order has thus been described as "quite possibly, the most prestigious honour one can receive on planet Earth." Within the limited membership is a designated military division, with its own unique insignia; though it has not been abolished, it is currently unpopulated, Louis Mountbatten, 1st Earl Mountbatten of Burma having been the last person so honoured.

Honorary members form another group, to which there is no numerical limit, though such appointments are rare; individuals from countries in the Commonwealth of Nations that are not headed by King Charles are therefore considered foreigners, and thus are granted only honorary admissions, such as Nelson Mandela (South Africa) and Mother Teresa (India).

Upon admission into the Order of Merit, members are entitled to use the post-nominal letters OM and are entrusted with the badge of the order.

== Insignia ==
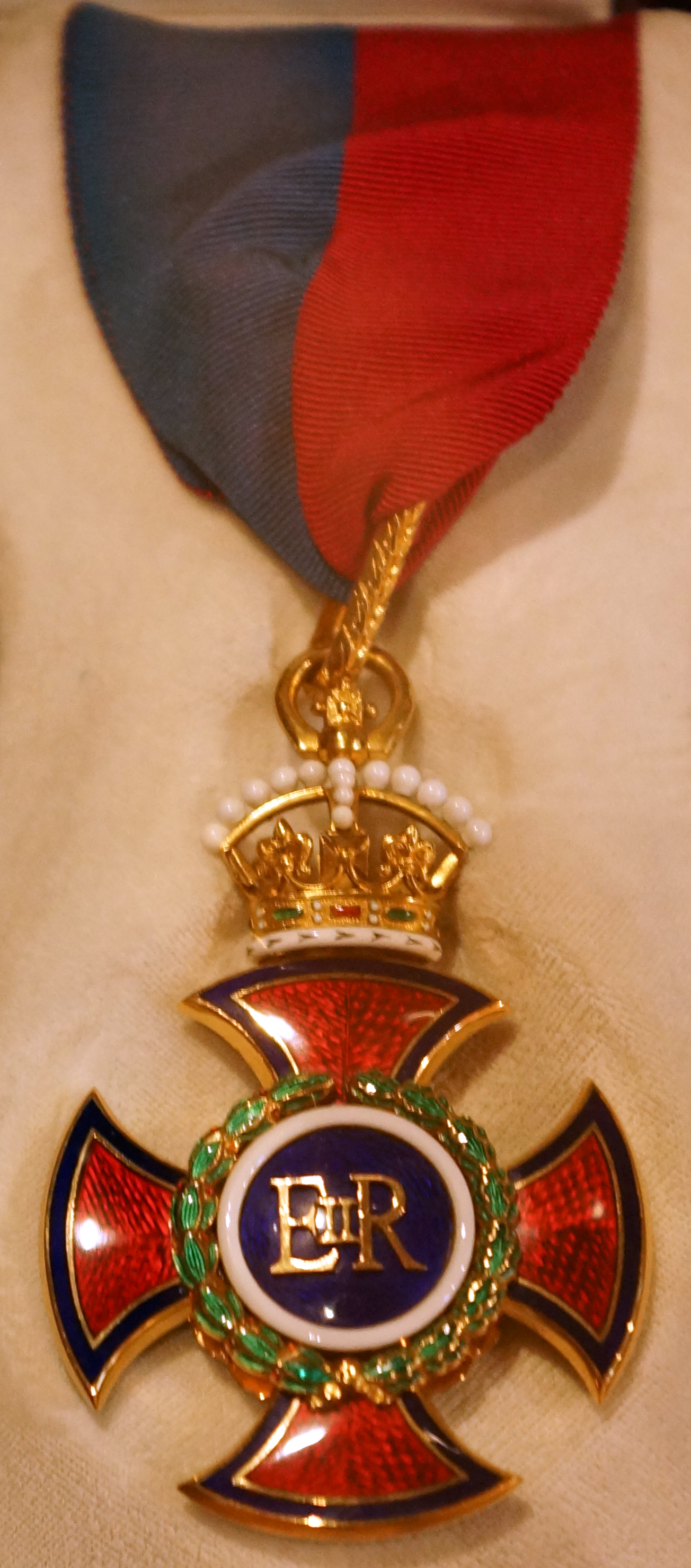
Reverse of the badge as issued during the reign of Elizabeth II, 1952–2022

The insignia consists of a badge, which consists of a golden crown from which is suspended a red enamelled cross pattée, itself centred by a disk of blue enamel, surrounded by a laurel wreath. The obverse of the badge's central disk bears the words FOR MERIT in gold lettering, while the reverse bears the royal cypher of the reigning monarch in gold. The insignia for the military grouping is distinguished by a pair of crossed swords behind the central disk.

The ribbon of the Order of Merit is divided into two stripes of red and blue. The neck ribbon is 50 mm in width, while the ribbon bar width is the standard British 32 mm size for military or civilian wear. Men wear their badges on a neck ribbon (as a necklet), while women wear theirs on a ribbon bow pinned to the left shoulder, and aides-de-camp may wear the insignia on their aiguillettes.

Since 1991, the insignia must be returned upon the recipient's death.

== Current members ==
=== Sovereign ===
Name	Year of appointment	Present age
King Charles III (ex officio)	2002 as The Prince of Wales; sovereign since 2022 (Note: The sovereign of the order, who was appointed a member on 27 June 2002 as Prince of Wales, is technically no longer a member of the Order of Merit. However, as its sovereign, he may continue to wear the insignia.)	77

=== Substantive members ===
Member number (Note: The number shown in brackets is the individual's place in the wider order of appointment since the Order's inception.)	Name	Known for	Year of appointment	Present age
1 (169)	Norman Foster, Baron Foster of Thames Bank OM, RA, HonFREng	Architect and Pritzker laureate	1997	91
2 (175)	Sir Roger Penrose OM, FRS, HonFInstP	Mathematical physicist and Nobel laureate	2000	95
3 (180)	Sir David Attenborough OM, GCMG, CH, CVO, CBE, FRS, FSA, FRSA, FLS, FZS, FRSGS, FRSB, HonFLI	Television broadcaster and conservationist	2005	100
4 (183)	Robin Eames, Baron Eames OM	Primate of All Ireland and Archbishop of Armagh	2007	90
5 (184)	Sir Tim Berners-Lee OM, KBE, FRS, FREng, FRSA, FBCS	Inventor of the World Wide Web, Founder of the World Wide Web Foundation and Director of the World Wide Web Consortium	2007	71
6 (185)	Martin Rees, Baron Rees of Ludlow OM, FRS, FREng, FMedSci, FRAS, HonFInstP	Astronomer Royal and President of the Royal Society	2007	84
7 (186)	Jean Chrétien PC, OM, CC, KC, AdE	Prime Minister of Canada	2009	92
8 (187)	Neil MacGregor OM, AO, FSA	Art historian and Director of the British Museum	2010	80
9 (189)	John Howard OM, AC, SSI	Prime Minister of Australia	2012	87
10 (190)	Sir Simon Rattle OM, CBE	Conductor	2014	71
11 (192)	Sir Magdi Yacoub OM, FRS	Cardiothoracic surgeon	2014	90
12 (193)	Ara Darzi, Baron Darzi of Denham OM, KBE, PC, FRS, FMedSci, FRCSI, FRCS, FRCSE, FRCPGlas, FACS, FRCP, FREng	Surgeon	2016	66
13 (194)	Dame Ann Dowling OM, DBE, FRS, FREng	Mechanical engineer	2016	74
14 (195)	Sir James Dyson OM, CBE, RDI, FRS, FREng, FCSD, FIEE	Inventor and industrial designer	2016	79
15 (196)	Dame Elizabeth Anionwu OM, DBE, FRCN	Nurse	2022	79
16 (197)	Floella Benjamin, Baroness Benjamin OM, DBE, DL	Broadcaster	2022	77
17 (198)	Margaret MacMillan OM, CC, CH, FRSL, FRSC, FBA, FRCGS	Author and Provost of Trinity College, Toronto	2022	82
18 (199)	Sir David Adjaye OM, OBE, RA	Architect	2022	60
19 (200)	Sir Paul Nurse OM, CH, FRS, FMedSci, HonFREng, HonFBA, MAE	Geneticist and Nobel laureate	2022	77
20 (201)	Venki Ramakrishnan (Note: Venki Ramakrishnan accepts titles, but prefers not to use them and post-nominal initials.)	Structural biologist and Nobel laureate	2022	74
21	Vacant (Note: Vacant following the death of Betty Boothroyd, Baroness Boothroyd on 26 February 2023.)			
22	Vacant (Note: Vacant following the death of Jacob Rothschild, 4th Baron Rothschild on 26 February 2024.)			
23	Vacant (Note: Vacant following the death of Tom Stoppard on 29 November 2025.)			
24	Vacant (Note: Vacant following the death of David Hockney on 11 June 2026.)			

=== Honorary members ===
There have been no honorary members of the Order of Merit since the death of the last such member, Nelson Mandela, in December 2013.

=== Officers ===
Secretary and Registrar: Robin Janvrin, Baron Janvrin GCB, GCVO, QSO, PC

== Order of wear ==
As the Order of Merit is open to the citizens of 15 countries, each with their own system of orders, decorations, and medals, the order's place of precedence varies from country to country. While, in the United Kingdom, the order's postnominal letters follow those of Knights and Dames Grand Cross of the Order of the Bath, membership in the Order of Merit itself gives members no place in any of the orders of precedence in the United Kingdom. However, Stanley Martin says in his book The Order of Merit 1902–2002: One Hundred Years of Matchless Honour, that the Order of Merit is the pinnacle of the British honours system. Similarly, though it was not listed in the Canadian order of precedence for honours, decorations, and medals until December 2010, Christopher McCreery, an expert on Canadian honours and secretary to the Lieutenant Governor of Nova Scotia, stated that the Order of Merit was the highest civilian award for merit a Canadian could receive.

Some orders of precedence are as follows:

Country	Order Preceding the Order of Merit	Order Following the Order of Merit
(Australia) Australia Order of wear	Knight/Lady of the Most Ancient and Most Noble Order of the Thistle (KT/LT)	Knight/Dame of the Order of Australia (AK/AD)
(Canada) Canada Order of wear	Cross of Valour (CV)	Companion of the Order of Canada (CC)
(New Zealand) New Zealand Order of wear	Knight/Dame Grand Cross of the Most Honourable Order of the Bath (GCB)	Member of the Order of New Zealand (ONZ)
United Kingdom Order of wear	Knight/Dame Grand Cross of the Most Honourable Order of the Bath (GCB)	Baronet's Badge (Bt)
