= Sierra Leone Independence Medal =

- Type: Commemorative Medal
- Awarded for: Service in Sierra Leone at independence
- Presented by: Sierra Leone, United Kingdom
- Eligibility: Military and police personnel
- Established: 26 April 1961

Highlights
- Total: 5,500
- Ribbon bar

Order of Wear
- Next (higher): Ceylon Police Independence Medal
- Next (lower): Jamaica Independence Medal

The Sierra Leone Independence Medal was authorised by Queen Elizabeth II on the occasion of the granting of independence to Sierra Leone, to give recognition to individuals of the Royal Sierra Leone Military Forces, Sierra Leone Naval Volunteer Force and the Police Force who were serving on the 27 April 1961. Members of United Kingdom Land Forces seconded to the Royal Sierra Leone Military Forces also qualified.

5,500 medals were supplied by the Royal Mint.

== Description ==
- The circular cupro-nickel medal has a diameter of 1.25 inches (32 mm) and features the crowned effigy of Queen Elizabeth II on the obverse.
- The reverse depicts the Sierra Leone Coat of Arms surrounded by the inscription Sierra Leone Independence, 27 April 1961 in a half circle above.
- The ribbon has a three vertical stripes, green, white and blue, the colours of the Sierra Leone national flag.

== See also ==
- Medals of Sierra Leone (1961–1971)
