= National Crime Agency Long Service and Good Conduct Medal =

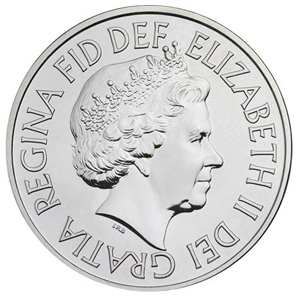
- Obverse of the medal
- Type: Long service medal
- Awarded for: 20 years of service
- Presented by: the United Kingdom
- Eligibility: Full time NCA Officers
- Status: Currently awarded
- Established: March 2017
- Ribbon bar of the medal

Order of Wear
- Next (higher): Ebola Medal for Service in West Africa
- Next (lower): Rhodesia Medal
- Related: Police Long Service and Good Conduct Medal

The National Crime Agency Long Service and Good Conduct Medal is a service medal for National Crime Agency (NCA) officers of the United Kingdom. Instituted in March 2017, the medal is presented for twenty aggregate years of service.

== Appearance ==
The medal is circular, 36 mm in diameter and is rhodium plated cupronickel. The obverse, designed by Ian Rank-Broadley, bears an effigy of Queen Elizabeth II with the wording ELIZABETH II DEI GRATIA REGINA FID DEF. The reverse has a portcullis representing primacy and compassion, flanked by a griffin representing bravery and truth, and a leopard representing valiance. The image is surrounded by the words 'NATIONAL CRIME AGENCY' and 'FOR EXEMPLARY SERVICE'. The suspender is of a straight non-swivelling type, the 32 mm wide ribbon being blue, with three narrow stripes of white, yellow and white at each edge. No bars for further service are authorised for this medal. Naming on the rim is in impressed capital letters.

== Criteria ==
The medal is awarded for twenty aggregate years of service and good conduct in the National Crime Agency, including previous service in HM Revenue and Customs and the NCA's precursor agencies, the Serious Organised Crime Agency, National Criminal Intelligence Service and National Crime Squad.
A total of 484 medals were awarded up to July 2017.

== See also ==
- Police Long Service and Good Conduct Medal
