= Royal Fleet Auxiliary Service Medal =

- Ribbon of the medal
- Type: Long service medal
- Awarded for: 20 years service
- Country: the United Kingdom
- Eligibility: Officers, petty officers, and rates of the Royal Fleet Auxiliary
- Status: Currently awarded

Order of Wear
- Next (higher): Ambulance Service (Emergency Duties) Long Service and Good Conduct Medal
- Next (lower): Prison Services (Operational Duties) Long Service and Good Conduct Medal

The Royal Fleet Auxiliary Service Medal is a long service medal presented to the officers, petty officers, and rates of the Royal Fleet Auxiliary (RFA) who complete 20 years of service. While the RFA services the fleet of the Royal Navy around the world, RFA crews are civilians and thus not eligible for Royal Navy long service awards and decorations. In 2001, a Royal Warrant was promulgated establishing the medal to recognize the long and efficient service the RFA personnel. The first awards were presented in 2003 with some 400 RFA personnel eligible for award.

== Appearance ==
The Royal Fleet Auxiliary Service Medal is a silver coloured circular medal made of cupro-nickel. The obverse bears the right facing portrait head of Queen Elizabeth II wearing the Imperial State Crown. Surrounding the portrait is the legend ELIZABETH.II.DEI .GRATIA.REGINA.FID.DEF. The reverse depicts the badge of the Royal Fleet Auxiliary: at its centre is a large fouled anchor supported on either side by the two Tritons each bearing a trident. Around the reverse edge is the legend ROYAL FLEET AUXILIARY and FOR LONG SERVICE separated by a small oak branch with three leaves and an acorn. Designed by Timothy Noad, his initials (TN) are located at the base of the anchor.
