= African Distinguished Conduct Medal =

Military decoration

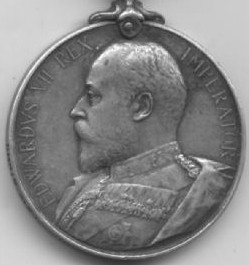
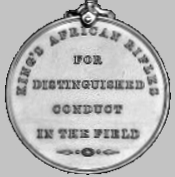
- Obverse and reverse of the medal
- Type: Bravery decoration
- Awarded for: Bravery in the field
- Country: British Empire
- Presented by: the Secretary of State for the Colonies
- Eligibility: African NCOs and soldiers of the KAR and RWAFF
- Status: Replaced by award of the Distinguished Conduct Medal in 1942
- Established: 1903
- Ribbon of all versions of the medal

Order of Wear
- Next (higher): King’s Fire Service Medal, for Gallantry
- Next (lower): Indian Distinguished Service Medal

The African Distinguished Conduct Medal was a military decoration awarded to native soldiers of the Royal West African Frontier Force and the King's African Rifles for gallantry in action. Sometimes known as the Royal West African Frontier Force Distinguished Conduct Medal or King's African Rifles Distinguished Conduct Medal, it could also be awarded to the Somaliland Camel Corps and the Nyasaland Regiment.

The medal was awarded until 1942 when it was replaced by the Imperial Distinguished Conduct Medal.

== Recipients ==
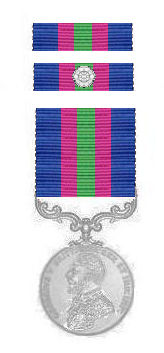
George V version, with ribbon bars

From, the 1870s, a number of awards of the Imperial Distinguished Conduct Medal were made to soldiers of native African regiments, before the creation of the African Distinguished Conduct Medal in 1903.

At least 412 medals were awarded:

- King's African Rifles: Edward VII: 2; George V: 190.
- West Africa Frontier Force: Edward VII: 55; George V: 165.
- An unnamed George VI King's African Rifles version of the medal is known.

Awards of the medal were normally gazetted in the appropriate colonial gazette, with pre-1914 awards appearing in the London Gazette.

== Appearance ==
The African Distinguished Conduct Medal was a circular silver disc, 36 mm (1.4 in) in diameter, with the following design:
Obverse: the effigy of the reigning sovereign.
Reverse: the inscription in four lines FOR DISTINGUISHED CONDUCT IN THE FIELD. Around the top edge was inscribed either KING'S AFRICAN RIFLES, WEST AFRICAN FRONTIER FORCE, or ROYAL WEST AFRICAN FRONTIER FORCE (after 1928).
Ribbon: 31.7 mm (1.25 in) wide, it is dark blue with a central green stripe, flanked by crimson stripes.
Naming: the recipient's name and details were engraved or impressed on the rim.

== See also ==
- King's African Rifles Long Service and Good Conduct Medal
