= Hong Kong Disciplined Services Medal =

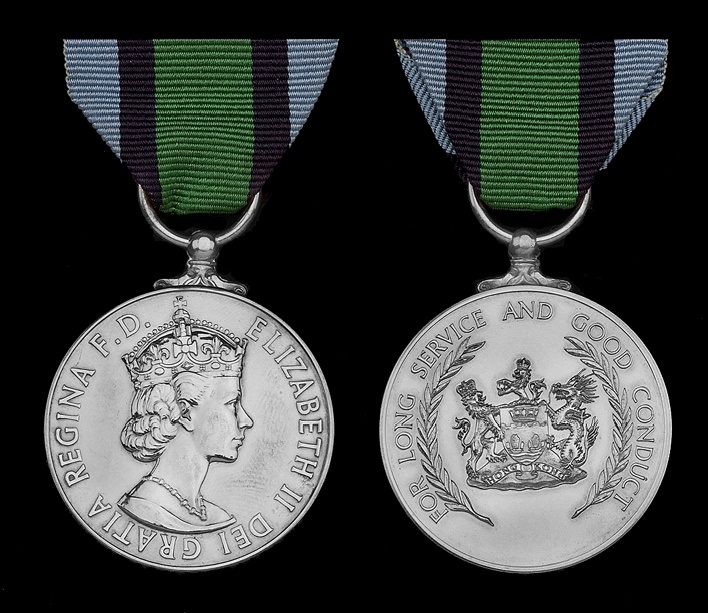
- Obverse (left) and reverse (right)
- Type: Long service medal
- Awarded for: Not less than 18 years of service in the Hong Kong Custom and Excise Service and Hong Kong Immigration Service
- Presented by: British Hong Kong
- Eligibility: Members of the Hong Kong Disciplined Services
- Ribbon: Hong Kong Disciplined Services Medal.png
- Status: No longer awarded after the 1997 transfer of sovereignty
- Established: 8 July 1986
- Ribbon of the medal

Precedence
- Next (higher): Colonial Prison Service Medal
- Next (lower): Army Emergency Reserve Decoration
- Related: Imperial Service Medal

The Hong Kong Disciplined Services Medal was a long service medal awarded to members of the Hong Kong Disciplined Services in British Hong Kong. Established by a Royal Warrant on 8 July 1986, the award of the medal was intended to replace the awarding of the Imperial Service Medal. This medal was replaced by both the Hong Kong Customs & Excise Long Service Medal and the Hong Kong Immigration Service Long Service Medal, for long service to members of the respective disciplined services, upon the transfer of sovereignty in 1997, however the same ribbon continues to be used for the Hong Kong Immigration Service Long Service Medal.

== Criteria ==
The medal could be awarded to all ranks of the Hong Kong Customs and Excise Service and Hong Kong Immigration Service for completion of eighteen years of full-time continuous service. This service must have been of an exemplary character, and the recipient must have been recommended by the officer in charge of his service.

Upon completion of 25 years of exemplary qualifying service a clasp may be awarded, with a second clasp being awarded for thirty years of qualifying service. When worn as a ribbon only the clasps are represented by a silver rose emblem.

== Appearance ==
The circular medal is made of silver and is 1 1/2 inches in diameter. The obverse depicts the crowned effigy of Elizabeth II. Around the edge are the words in relief ELIZABETH II DEI GRATIA REGINA FIDEI DEFENSOR. The reverse bears the Armorial Bearings of Hong Kong, flanked by laurel branches. Around the edge are the words FOR LONG SERVICE AND GOOD CONDUCT in relief. The name and rank of the recipient is engraved on the edge of the medal.

The medal is worn suspended from a ribbon 1 3/8 inches wide. The ribbon has a broad center green stripe, bordered by dark blue, with edges of sky blue.
