= Emergency Reserve Decoration =

British military decoration

Army Emergency Reserve Decoration
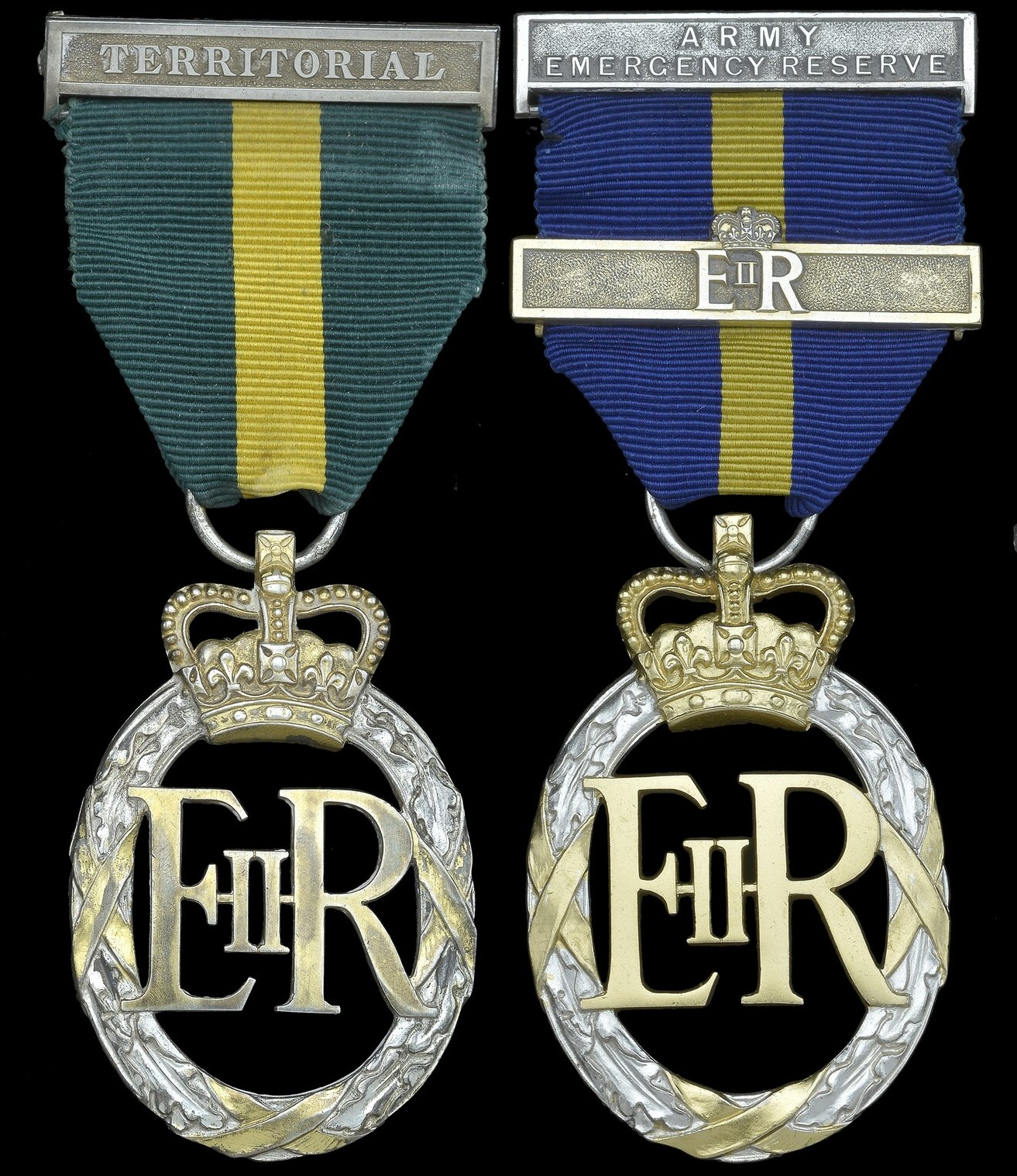
- Right: Emergency Reserve Decoration with 2nd award clasp. The badge is identical to the Elizabeth II version of the Efficiency Decoration, left
- Type: Long service decoration
- Awarded for: 12 years of service
- Presented by: the United Kingdom
- Eligibility: Officers of the Army Emergency Reserve or Army Supplementary Reserve
- Post-nominals: E.R.D.
- Status: Superseded by Efficiency Decoration for the Territorial and Army Volunteer Reserve in 1967
- Established: 1952
- First award: 1953
- Final award: 1967 (Retrospective awards up to 2004)
- Ribbon bar

Precedence
- Next (higher): Hong Kong Disciplined Services Medal
- Next (lower): Volunteer Officers' Decoration

The Emergency Reserve Decoration (ERD) was a British military decoration for long service, instituted on 17 November 1952 and given for service up to 1967.

== Eligibility ==
It was awarded to officers of the Army Supplementary Reserve or Army Emergency Reserve of Officers for 12 years continuous or aggregate service, with war service counting as double and previous service in the ranks counting as half. Officers commissioned in either reserve between 8 August 1942 and 15 May 1948 who transferred to the Regular Army Reserve of Officers after 10 years service were also eligible.

The Emergency Reserve Decoration was not awarded for service after 1967, on the creation of the Territorial and Army Volunteer Reserve, when it was replaced by the Efficiency Decoration with brooch bar inscribed T.& A.V.R., although a number of retrospective awards were later made.

The official order of wear specifies that the ERD is worn after the Hong Kong Disciplined Services Medal and before the Volunteer Officers' Decoration. Recipients may use the letters ERD after their name.

Other ranks in the Emergency Reserve were eligible for the Army Emergency Reserve Efficiency Medal.

== Appearance ==
The obverse is a silver and silver-gilt oval wreath of oak leaves, 55mm high and 37mm wide. Queen Elizabeth II's Royal cypher (EIIR) is in the centre, surmounted by a crown, both gilded. The reverse is plain, with the year of award engraved at the bottom. The dark blue ribbon with a central yellow stripe is attached to a ring on top of the crown, and is finished at the top with a brooch bar bearing the inscription ARMY EMERGENCY RESERVE. Save for the different ribbon and bar brooch inscription, the award is identical to the Efficiency Decoration.

A clasp, to be worn on the ribbon, was awarded upon the completion of each further period of six years of qualifying service. The clasp is silver and has the Royal Cypher in the centre, surmounted by the Royal Crown, with the year of the award engraved on the reverse. When ribbons alone are worn, a silver rosette is worn on the ribbon to denote each clasp. The maximum number of clasps awarded to any one officer is four.
