= King's African Rifles Long Service and Good Conduct Medal =

- Ribbon of the medal
- Awarded for: Long service
- Description: Circular silver medal
- Presented by: the United Kingdom
- Eligibility: Members of the King's African Rifles
- Post-nominals: None
- Status: No longer awarded
- Established: 1907
- Final award: Early 1960s

The King's African Rifles Long Service and Good Conduct Medal was approved in March 1907 to recognise long service and good conduct by native African NCOs and men of the King's African Rifles (KAR).

Initially, the period of qualifying service to be eligible for the medal was 18 years, but in March 1933 it was reduced to 16 years. Awards were discontinued in the early 1960s, as each of Britain's East African colonies received independence, with KAR units redesignated or disbanded.

It is a 36 mm wide circular silver medal bearing the effigy of the reigning monarch on the obverse. The reverse is inscribed 'FOR LONG SERVICE AND GOOD CONDUCT' over four lines with, around the top circumference of the medal, the words 'KING'S AFRICAN RIFLES'. The 32 mm wide ribbon is crimson with a central green stripe, the same as for the Royal West African Frontier Force Long Service and Good Conduct Medal.

The medal was worn in uniform after campaign and royal commemorative medals.

== See also ==
- African Distinguished Conduct Medal
- King's African Rifles
- British Empire
