= Ebola Medal for Service in West Africa =

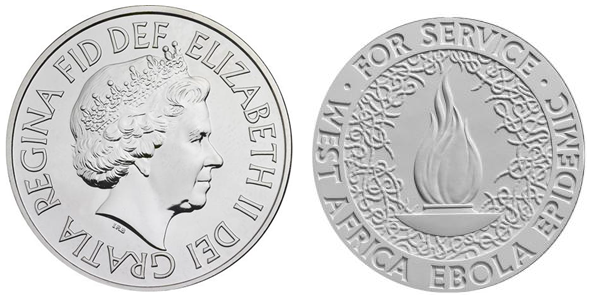
- Obverse and reverse of the medal
- Type: Service medal
- Awarded for: 21 days of continuous service or 30 days accumulated service on working visits of 48 hours or more to the operating area.
- Description: Nickel-silver, 36mm diameter
- Presented by: UK
- Eligibility: British forces and civilian personnel
- Post-nominals: None
- Campaign: Ebola virus epidemic in West Africa
- Status: Awarded for service between 23 March 2014 to 29 March 2016
- Established: June 2015

Highlights
- Total: 3,000+
- Ribbon bar

Order of Wear
- Next (higher): Merchant Navy Medal for Meritorious Service
- Next (lower): National Crime Agency Long Service and Good Conduct Medal
- Related: Iraq Reconstruction Service Medal; Civilian Service Medal (Afghanistan)

The Ebola Medal for Service in West Africa, known simply as the Ebola Medal, is a service medal for issue to the Armed Forces and to civilians, working either for Her Majesty's Government or for non-governmental organisations, in support of the British Government's response to the Ebola crisis in West Africa between March 2014 and March 2016. The medal is the first to be awarded by the UK Government for a humanitarian crisis response.

== Description ==
The medal was manufactured by Worcestershire Medal Service.

- It is a circular, nickel-silver medal, 36mm diameter. It is suspended from a ribbon by way of a swivel straight bar.
- The obverse, designed by Ian Rank-Broadley, has the legend "ELIZABETH II DEI GRATIA REGINA FID.DEF." and the effigy of Elizabeth II wearing the Girls of Great Britain and Ireland tiara.
- The reverse is a design by John Bergdahl, and features a flame on a background depicting the Ebola virus – above this are the words “For Service” and below “West Africa Ebola Epidemic”.

The name of the recipient (name and title if civilian; name, rank and serial number if military) is engraved on the rim of the medal.

=== Ribbon ===
The ribbon consists of a thin central yellow stripe, flanked by blue and white stripes, and symmetrical red stripes flanked by green stripes either side. These represent the colours from the national flags of the countries in West Africa affected by Ebola.

== Order of Wear ==
The medal is worn immediately after the Merchant Navy Medal for Meritorious Service.

== Qualifying ==
The qualifying period for award of the medal is from 23 March 2014 until 29 March 2016. The medal is awarded either for 21 days of continuous service within the operating area, or 30 days accumulated service on working visits of 48 hours or more to the operating area. In the event of qualifying service ending prematurely due to death, serious illness, evacuation or disability due to service, where the individual had otherwise been expected to complete their service, the reduced service length will be deemed as qualification for the award. As of 13 November 2015, 2,448 medals were issued.

The following groups are eligible for award:

- Military personnel under the command of Commander, Joint Operations, and other members of UK Armed Forces providing direct support to HM Government's response.
- Any volunteer or employee directly deployed by the Department for International Development (DFID), UK-Med, Public Health England, the National Health Service or the Stabilisation Unit in support of HM Government's response.
- Any member of Civil Service.
- Any UK national employed by an NGO funded by the DFID supporting HM Government's response.
- Any UK national responding to the Ebola crisis in support of HM Government's response whose service can be verified.

The operating area is classified as the territory and/or territorial waters of Sierra Leone, Liberia and Guinea; these three countries were defined by the World Health Organization as having had "widespread and intense transmission" of the Ebola virus.

== See also ==
- Ebola virus epidemic in West Africa
