= Jamaica Independence Medal =

- Type: Independence Medal
- Awarded for: Service in Jamaica at independence
- Presented by: Jamaica
- Eligibility: Military personnel and civilians
- Established: 6 August 1962
- ribbon of medal

Order of Wear
- Next (higher): Sierra Leone Independence Medal
- Next (lower): Uganda Independence Medal

The Jamaica Independence Medal is a commemorative medal marking the independence of Jamaica on 6 August 1962. The medal was awarded to those individuals serving in the Jamaica Defence Force and to certain civilian officials when Jamaica became Independent.

== Appearance ==
The Jamaica Independence Medal is circular in shape, made of cupro-nickel metal. On the obverse of the medal the crowned effigy of Queen Elizabeth II facing right. Around the edge of the medal is the title QUEEN ELIZABETH II. The reverse of the medal bears the Coat of arms of Jamaica. The edge of the medal is impressed with the text JAMAICA INDEPENDENCE 6TH AUGUST 1962. The medal hangs from a ring suspension attached by a laterally pierced ball-type suspension. The ribbon of the medal is green and yellow with a broad central stripe of black.
