= Ambulance Service (Emergency Duties) Long Service and Good Conduct Medal =

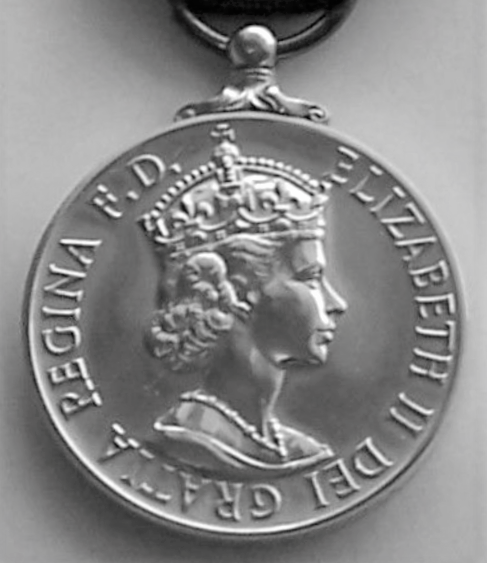
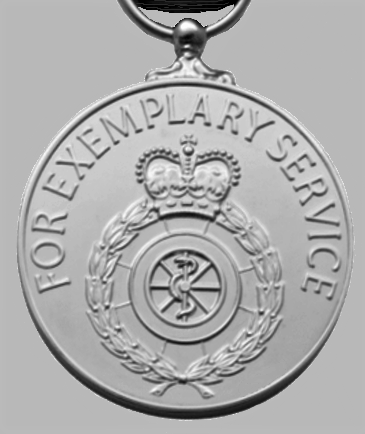
- Obverse and reverse of the medal (Scottish awards have a different reverse)
- Type: Long service and good conduct medal
- Awarded for: 20 years of service with good conduct
- Presented by: the United Kingdom
- Eligibility: Advanced Practitioners, Associate Ambulance Practitioners, Ambulance Technicians, Ambulance Nurses, Community First Responders (subject to additional criteria), Emergency call handlers, Emergency Care Assistants (or equivalent), Emergency dispatchers, Paramedics, other NHS Ambulance staff with a qualifying background from the above now working in a training, clinical leadership, management, patient safety or operational command response role
- Clasps: 30 years service, 40 years service
- Status: Currently awarded
- Established: 5 July 1995
- First award: 1995
- Ribbon bar of the medal

Order of Wear
- Next (higher): Civil Defence Long Service Medal
- Next (lower): Royal Fleet Auxiliary Service Medal

The Ambulance Service (Emergency Duties) Long Service and Good Conduct Medal is a long service medal of the United Kingdom established in 1995. The medal is awarded to recognise long service by all clinical grades of the ambulance services who serve on emergency duty. The royal warrant was updated in October 2024.

== Criteria ==
The Ambulance Service (Emergency Duties) Long Service and Good Conduct Medal is presented for 20 years commendable service to all clinical grades, such as Associate Ambulance Practitioners, Ambulance Technicians, Ambulance Nurses, Emergency Care Assistants, Paramedics and Advanced Practitioners employed in emergency duties in the ambulance services across the United Kingdom; the 2024 update extended the criteria to include emergency control / operations room staff such as emergency call handlers and emergency dispatchers as well as clinical staff now working in roles such as management, training, patient safety and clinical leadership. Full-time and part-time staff qualify, part-time staff are subject to certain conditions. For staff no longer working directly in a front-line role there is no longer a minimum requirement for how many of their 20 years service that must have been spent on emergency duties as a clinical grade, but wholly non-clinical and non-emergency staff grades do not qualify.

Service prior to 1974 in an ambulance service maintained by a local authority may also be counted. The 2024 update to the royal warrant includes provision for ribbon clasps (previously not provided) to recognise 30 and 40 years' service with good conduct.

The bodies covered by the medal are the various ambulance services trusts in England; the ambulance services of Scotland, Wales, Northern Ireland, the Isle of Man and the States of Jersey; and the Guernsey Ambulance and Rescue Service. Private / independent ambulance services and the voluntary sector are not included in the warrant.

== Appearance ==
The medal is circular, 1.4 inches (36 mm) in diameter, and made of cupro-nickel. The obverse bears the crowned effigy of the reigning sovereign, surrounded by the royal titles; during the reign of Queen Elizabeth II: ELIZABETH II DEI GRATIA REGINA F.D. and since the 2023 coronation of King Charles III: CHARLES III DEI GRATIA REX FID DEF (by the Grace of God, Queen / King, Defender of the Faith). The reverse depicts the insignia of the NHS ambulance services trusts or, for awards in Scotland that of the Scottish Ambulance Service, with the words FOR EXEMPLARY SERVICE above.

The medal has a ring suspension, the 1.25 inches (32 mm) wide ribbon being green with white edges that are bisected by a narrow green stripe.
