= Indian Meritorious Service Medal (for Europeans of Indian Army) =

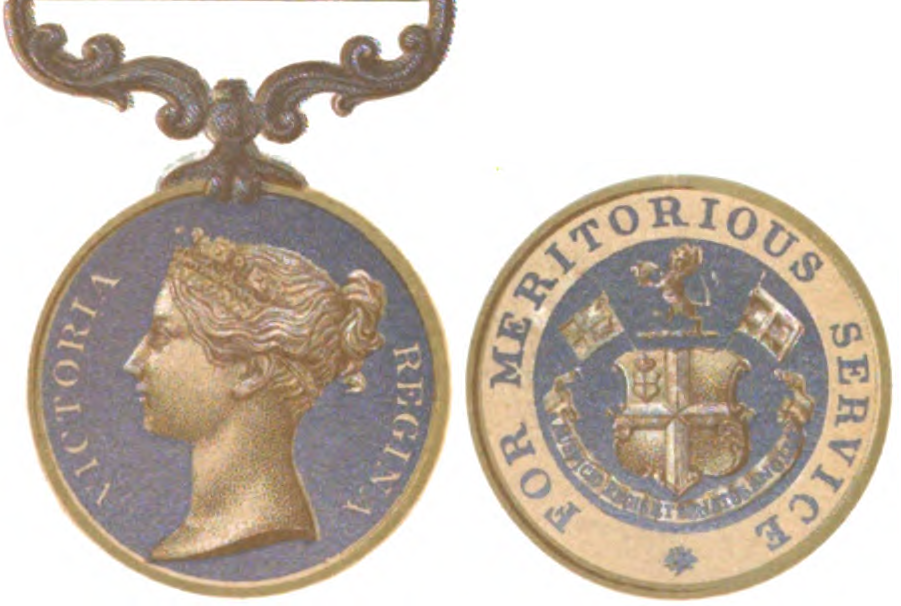
- Obverse and reverse of the medal
- Type: Long and meritorious service medal
- Presented by: HEIC and the British Raj
- Eligibility: Europeans in the British Indian Army
- Status: Replaced by Meritorious Service Medal
- Established: 1848
- Final award: 1873
- Ribbon of the medal

Order of Wear
- Next (higher): Indian Long Service and Good Conduct Medal (for Europeans of Indian Army)
- Next (lower): Royal Marines Meritorious Service Medal

The Indian Meritorious Service Medal (for Europeans of Indian Army) was a medal to recognize long and meritorious service by European non-commissioned officers in service of the East India Company's Army.

== History ==
Established by the East India Company in 1848, the Indian Meritorious Service Medal was established along the same lines as the Meritorious Service Medal for non-commissioned officers in the British Army. Even after the Indian Rebellion of 1857 brought the end of company rule, the medal continued to be awarded to those eligible European personnel serving in the British Indian Army. This practice continued until 1873 when it was decided that European personnel would be awarded the same Meritorious Service Medal as was awarded to the members of the British Army.

== Appearance ==
The medal was designed by William Wyon, with the dies for the medal executed by the Royal Mint. The medal was circular, made of silver, and 1.4 inches in diameter. The obverse of the medal bears a left facing effigy of Queen Victoria wearing a diadem. To the left of the effigy is the word VICTORIA to the right of the effigy is the word REGINA. The reverse depicts the arms, motto, and crest of the East India Company in the center surrounded by an outer ring. Upon the ring is the inscription FOR MERITORIOUS SERVICE.

The medal is mounted from a silver scrolled bar with a claw attachment to the medal. The ribbon for the medal was not spelled out by regulation, but by convention used a 1.25 inch wide crimson ribbon, the same as the British Army's Meritorious Service Medal.

== Works cited ==
- Mayo, John Horsley (1897). Medals and Decorations of the British Army and Navy, Volume 2. London: A. Constable.
