= Royal West African Frontier Force Long Service and Good Conduct Medal =

- Ribbon bar of the medal
- Awarded for: Long service and good conduct
- Description: Circular silver medal
- Presented by: the United Kingdom
- Eligibility: Members of the Royal West African Frontier Force
- Status: No longer awarded
- Established: 1903
- Final award: 1960

The Royal West African Frontier Force Long Service and Good Conduct Medal was established in September 1903 to reward native African NCOs and men who had completed 18 years, later reduced to 16 years of exemplary service in the Royal West African Frontier Force (RWAFF).

The RWAFF was a multi-battalion field force formed by the British Colonial Office in 1900 to garrison the West African colonies of Nigeria, Gold Coast, Sierra Leone, and Gambia. The 'Royal' prefix was granted in 1928 and reflected in the medal title from that year.

The medal award was discontinued when the RWAFF was disbanded in 1960 following the creation of new national armies as each colony moved toward independence.

It is a 36mm wide circular silver medal bearing the effigy of the reigning monarch on the obverse. The reverse is inscribed 'FOR LONG SERVICE AND GOOD CONDUCT' over four lines with, around the top circumference, the words 'ROYAL WEST AFRICAN FRONTIER FORCE', with the 'ROYAL' added in 1928. The 32mm wide ribbon is crimson with a central green stripe, the same as for the King's African Rifles Long Service and Good Conduct Medal.

The medal was worn in uniform after campaign and royal commemorative medals.

== Royal Sierra Leone Military Forces Long Service and Good Conduct Medal ==
This medal replaced the RWAFF after Sierra Leone became independent in April 1961. The award, ribbon, and medal design terms followed the earlier medal, except the reverse now included the inscription 'ROYAL SIERRA LEONE MILITARY FORCES'. 169 awards were made up to 1971 when the country became a republic.

== See also ==
- Royal West African Frontier Force
- British Empire
