= Overseas Territories Police Long Service Medal =

Colonial Police Long Service Medal
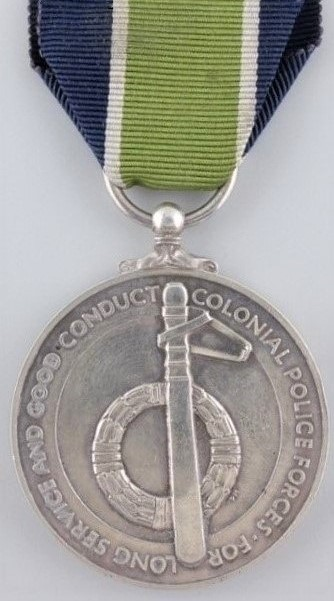
- Reverse of medal, 1934–2012
- Type: Long service medal
- Awarded for: 18 years efficient service
- Presented by: the United Kingdom
- Eligibility: Full-time members of the police forces of colonies and overseas territories
- Clasps: 25 years 30 years
- Established: 23 March 1934
- Ribbon bar

Order of Wear
- Next (higher): Sierra Leone Police Long Service Medal
- Next (lower): Sierra Leone Fire Brigades Long Service Medal
- Related: Police Long Service and Good Conduct Medal; Colonial Fire Brigades Long Service Medal; Colonial Special Constabulary Medal; Colonial Prison Service Medal

The Colonial Police Long Service Medal was established in 1934 to recognise long service in the police forces of the colonies and overseas territories of the United Kingdom. On 10 April 2012 the medal became known as the Overseas Territories Police Long Service Medal.

== History ==
The medal was originally established on 23 March 1934 as the Colonial Police and Fire Brigade Long Service Medal. A new Royal Warrant issued on 21 March 1956 provided for separate Colonial Police and Fire Brigade medals under their own warrants, with the name of medal changing to Colonial Police Long Service Medal. The name was again changed in 2012 to the Overseas Territories Police Long Service Medal. This reflected the change in the way Britain's remaining colonies were described, they being classed as 'Overseas Territories' from 2002.

The medal is awarded for 18 years full-time, continuous and efficient service in the Police Force of any British Colony or Overseas Territory. Service in more than one colony can qualify, as can previous service in any police force entitled to the Police Long Service and Good Conduct Medal, while excluding any service for which this medal has already been awarded. Compulsory service in the British armed forces or Merchant Navy which interrupted, and was continuous with, qualifying police service counts.

Clasps are awarded for completing 25 and 30 years service respectively. In undress uniform, when only ribbons are worn, these clasps are represented by silver rosettes attached to the ribbon.

== Appearance ==
The medal is circular, silver and 36 mm (1.4 in) in diameter. The obverse depicts the effigy of the reigning sovereign surrounded by the royal titles. To date, there have been six types of obverse, the date in brackets showing the year the design was introduced:

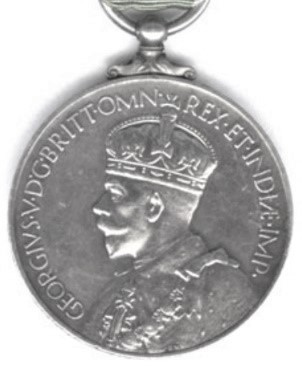
George V, robed bust (1934)

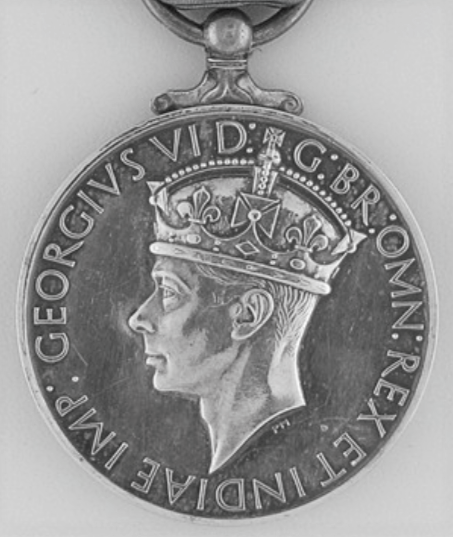
George VI, INDIAE IMP (1937)

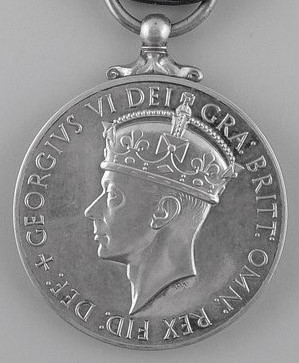
George VI, omits INDIAE IMP (1948)

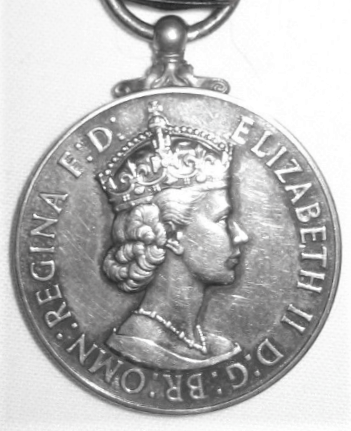
Elizabeth II, BR:OMN (1953)

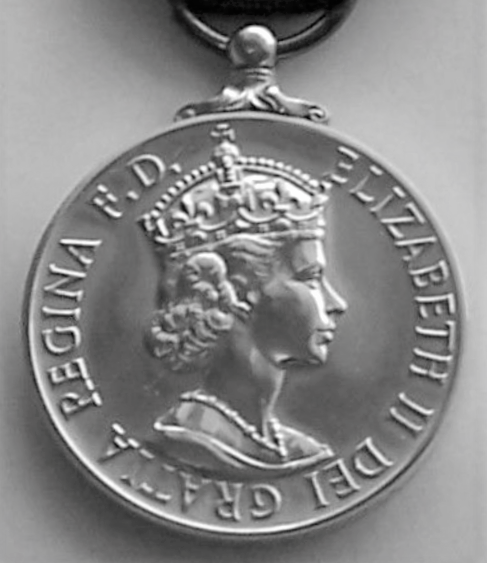
Elizabeth II, DEI GRATIA (circa 1955)

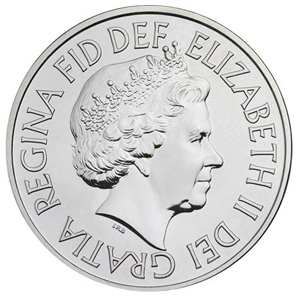
Elizabeth II (circa 2012)

The reverse depicts a police officer's truncheon superimposed on a laurel wreath. Circumscribed around the central design are the words FOR LONG SERVICE AND GOOD CONDUCT and COLONIAL POLICE FORCES. In 2012 this latter wording was changed to OVERSEAS TERRITORIES POLICE FORCES. The name and details of the recipient are engraved on the edge of the medal.

The medal hangs from a ring with claw suspension. The ribbon of the medal is dark blue with a wide central stripe of green, with the centre stripe bordered by thin stripes of white. The clasps for further service are attached to the ribbon and are silver and decorated with a spray of laurel.
