= Colonial Fire Brigades Long Service Medal =

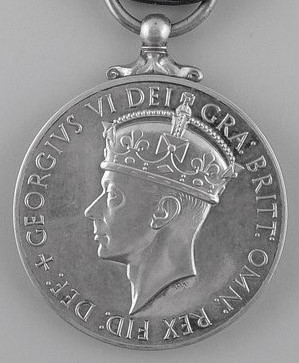
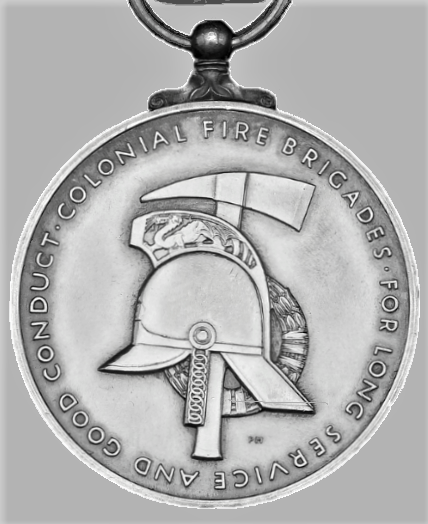
- Obverse (1948–53) and reverse (1934–2012)
- Type: Long service medal
- Awarded for: 18 years efficient service
- Presented by: the United Kingdom
- Eligibility: Full and part-time members of the fire services of colonies and overseas territories.
- Clasps: 25 years 30 years
- Established: 23 March 1934
- Ribbon of the medal

Order of Wear
- Next (higher): Mauritius Prisons Service Long Service and Good Conduct Medal
- Next (lower): Colonial Prison Service Medal
- Related: Colonial Police Long Service Medal; Colonial Special Constabulary Medal; Colonial Prison Service Medal

The Colonial Fire Brigades Long Service Medal, now known as the Overseas Territories Fire Brigades Long Service Medal, was established in 1934 to recognise long service in the fire services of the colonies and overseas territories of the United Kingdom.

== History ==
The medal was originally established on 23 March 1934 as the Colonial Police and Fire Brigade Long Service Medal. A new Royal Warrant issued on 21 March 1956 provided for separate Colonial Fire Brigades and Police medals under their own warrants, with the name of the medal changing to the Colonial Fire Brigades Long Service Medal. The name was again changed in 2012 to the Overseas Territories Fire Brigades Long Service Medal. This reflected the change in the way Britain's remaining colonies were described, they being classed as 'Overseas Territories' from 2002.

The medal is awarded for 18 years continuous and efficient full or part-time service in a fire brigade of any British Colony or Overseas Territory. Service in more than one colony can qualify, as can previous service in any fire brigade entitled to the Fire Brigade Long Service and Good Conduct Medal, excluding any service already recognised by the award of a British long service medal. Compulsory service in the British armed forces or Merchant Navy which interrupted, and was continuous with, qualifying fire service counts.

Clasps are awarded for completing 25 and 30 years service respectively. In undress uniform, when only ribbons are worn, these clasps are represented by silver rosettes attached to the ribbon.

== Appearance ==
The medal is circular and silver, 36 mm (1.4 in) in diameter. The obverse depicts the effigy of the reigning sovereign surrounded by the royal titles. To date, there have been five types of obverse, the date in brackets showing the year the design was introduced:

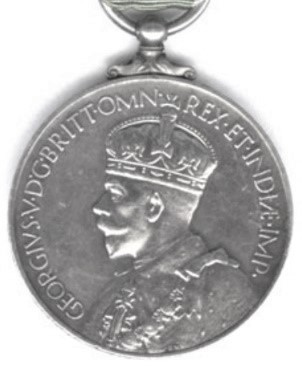
George V, robed bust (1934)

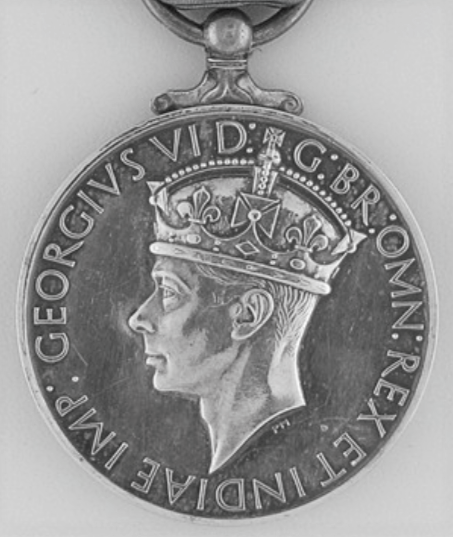
George VI, INDIAE IMP (1937)

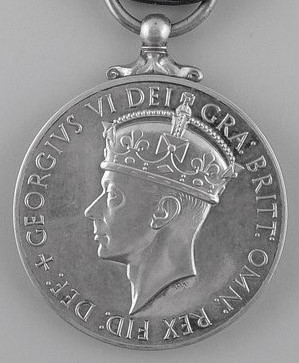
George VI, omits INDIAE IMP (1948)

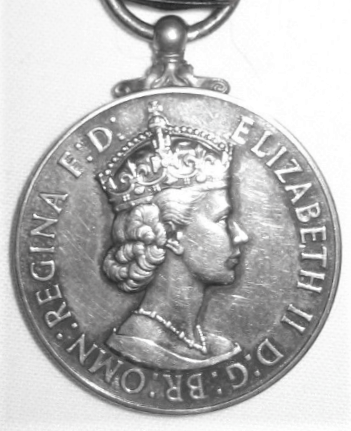
Elizabeth II, BR:OMN (1953)

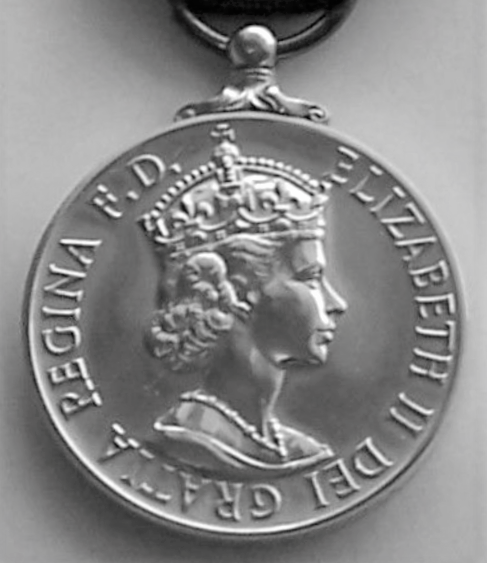
Elizabeth II, DEI GRATIA (circa 1955)

From the creation of the medal in 1934 the reverse was distinct from the police version of the medal, and bears the depiction of a Firefighter's helmet and Fire axe superimposed on a laurel wreath. Circumscribed around the central design are the words FOR LONG SERVICE AND GOOD CONDUCT • COLONIAL FIRE BRIGADES •. In 2012 this latter wording was changed to OVERSEAS TERRITORIES FIRE BRIGADES.

The medal hangs from a ring with claw suspension. The ribbon is dark blue with a central stripe of green, with the centre stripe divided by three thin stripes of white. The clasps for further service are attached to the ribbon and are silver and decorated with a spray of laurel.
