= Indian Long Service and Good Conduct Medal (for Europeans of Indian Army) =

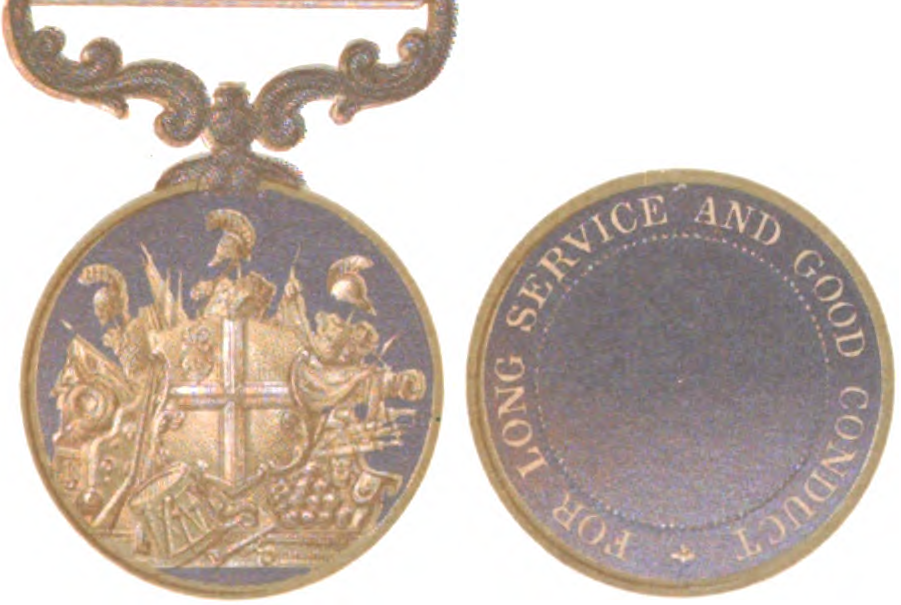
- Obverse and reverse of the medal
- Type: Long service medal
- Awarded for: 21 years of long service and good conduct
- Presented by: HEIC and the British Raj
- Eligibility: Europeans in the British Indian Army
- Status: Replaced by Long Service and Good Conduct Medal
- Established: 1848
- Final award: 1873
- Ribbon of the medal

Order of Wear
- Next (higher): Medal for Meritorious Service (Royal Navy)
- Next (lower): Indian Meritorious Service Medal (for Europeans of Indian Army)

The Indian Long Service and Good Conduct Medal (for Europeans of Indian Army) was a medal to recognize long and efficient service by Europeans in service of the East India Company's Army.

== History ==
Established by the East India Company in 1848, the Indian Long Service and Good Conduct Medal was established along the same lines as the Army Long Service and Good Conduct Medal for other ranks in the British Army. European troops were recognized by the award of the medal for long and efficient service totaling at least 21 years. Even after the Indian Rebellion of 1857 brought the end of company rule, the medal continued to be awarded to those eligible European personnel serving in the British Indian Army. This practice continued until 1873 when it was decided that European personnel would be awarded the same Long Service and Good Conduct Medal as was awarded to the members of the British Army.

== Appearance ==
The medal was circular, made of silver, and 1.4 inches in diameter. The obverse of the medal depicts a military trophy of arms, with the arms of the East India Company in the centre. This design is based upon the design used by the British Army and designed by Benedetto Pistrucci. The reverse is blank in the center to allow the recipients name and details to be engraved and is surrounded by a ring. Upon the ring is the inscription FOR LONG SERVICE AND GOOD CONDUCT.

The medal is mounted from a silver scrolled bar with a claw attachment to the medal. The ribbon for the medal was not spelled out by regulation, but by convention used a 1.25 inch wide crimson ribbon, the same as the British Army's Long Service and Good Conduct Medal.

== Works cited ==
- Mayo, John Horsley (1897). Medals and Decorations of the British Army and Navy, Volume 2. London: A. Constable.
