= Uganda Independence Medal =

- Type: Independence Medal
- Awarded for: service in Uganda at independence
- Presented by: Uganda
- Eligibility: Military, civilian and police personnel
- Established: 30 August 1962
- Ribbon of the medal

Precedence
- Next (higher): Jamaica Independence Medal

The Uganda Independence Medal was authorised by Queen Elizabeth II on the occasion of the granting of independence to Uganda to give recognition to individuals of the Armed Forces, Police Force and Local Government. Members of the military and police serving on 9 October 1962 and civil servants, local government employees and other residents of Uganda who have rendered outstanding public service.

== Description ==
- The circular cupro-nickel Uganda Independence Medal features the crowned effigy of Queen Elizabeth II.
- The reverse of the medal depicts the Uganda Coat of Arms and the inscription Uganda Independence, 9th October 1962.
- The ribbon has a six equal vertical stripes, black, yellow, red, black, yellow red.

== See also ==
- Golden Jubilee Medal of Uganda, 2012 medal, also called the Independence Medal
