= Colonial Special Constabulary Medal =

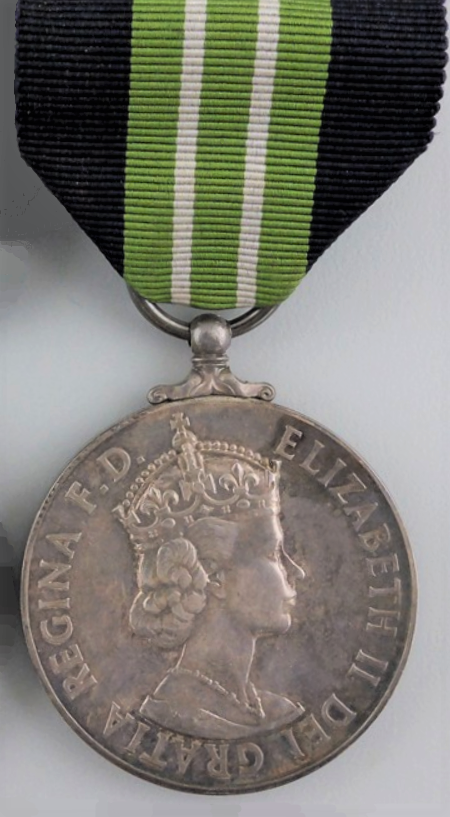
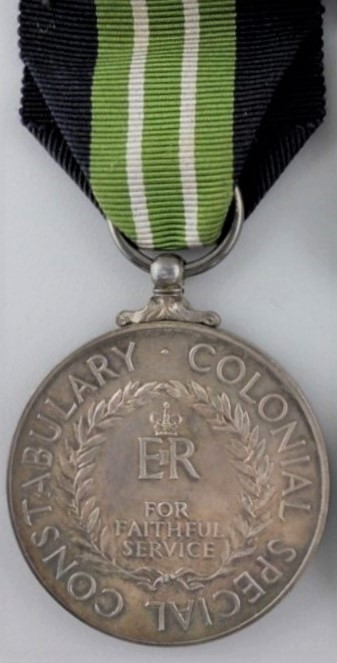
- Original obverse and reverse of the medal
- Type: Long service medal
- Awarded for: 9 years unpaid, or 15 years paid service
- Presented by: United Kingdom
- Eligibility: Members of the Special Constabulary in British Overseas Territories
- Clasps: Awarded for a further 10 years service
- Ribbon of the medal

Order of Wear
- Next (higher): South African Medal for War Services

The Colonial Special Constabulary Medal was established on 1 April 1957 as a volunteer and part-time long service medal of the United Kingdom and the Commonwealth. On 10 April 2012 the medal became known as the Overseas Territories Special Constabulary Medal, and underwent a minor change in design. This reflected the change in the way Britain's remaining colonies were described, they being classed as 'Overseas Territories' from 2002.

== Eligibility ==
The medal is presented to members of the Special Constabulary of a British colony or Overseas Territory for long and meritorious service. It is awarded for part-time service of either nine years if unpaid, or fifteen years paid. A clasp is awarded for each further ten years of service.

== Description ==
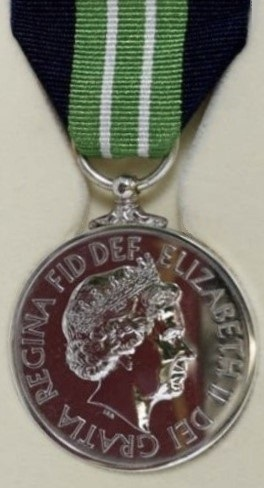
Obverse since 2012

The medal is circular, silver and 36 mm (1.4 in) in diameter. It has the following design:

- The obverse shows the right-facing effigy of Queen Elizabeth II with an appropriate inscription. When the name of the medal changed in 2012, an updated effigy of Elizabeth II was adopted, designed by Ian Rank-Broadley.
- The reverse shows the Royal cypher above the words 'FOR FAITHFUL SERVICE', surrounded a laurel wreath. The inscription 'COLONIAL SPECIAL CONSTABULARY' appeared outside the wreath until 2012, when this changed to 'OVERSEAS TERRITORIES SPECIAL CONSTABULARY'.
- The medal has the name and details of the recipient inscribed on the rim.
- The 32 mm (1.3 in) wide ribbon is green with two narrow white stripes towards the centre and wide edges of dark blue.
- The clasp for further awards is attached to the ribbon and is silver and decorated with a spray of laurel.
