= Colonial Prison Service Medal =

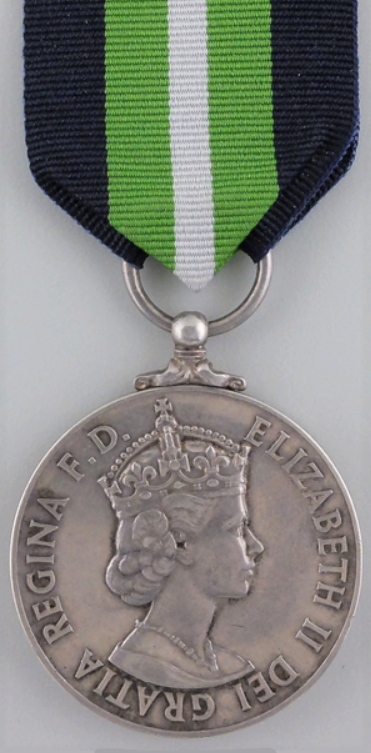
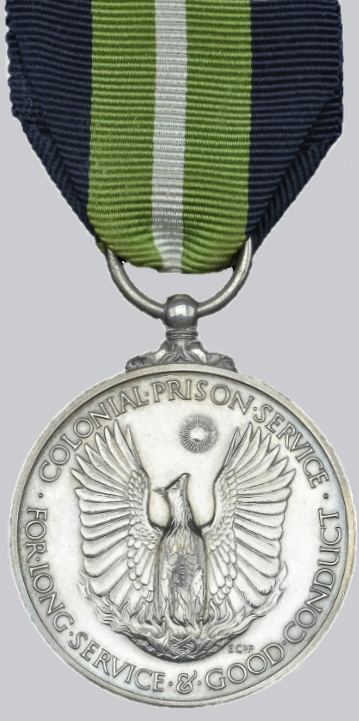
- Original obverse and reverse of the medal
- Type: Long service medal
- Awarded for: 18 years efficient service
- Presented by: The United Kingdom
- Eligibility: Full-time members of prison services of colonies and overseas territories
- Clasps: 25 years 35 years
- Established: October 1955
- Ribbon of the medal

Order of Wear
- Next (higher): Colonial Fire Brigades Long Service Medal
- Next (lower): Hong Kong Disciplined Services Medal

The Colonial Prison Service Medal was established on 28 October 1955 as a long service medal of the United Kingdom and the Commonwealth. On 10 April 2012 the medal became known as the Overseas Territories Prison Service Medal, and underwent a minor change in design. This reflected the change in the way Britain's remaining colonies were described, they having been classed as 'Overseas Territories' from 2002.

== Criteria ==
The medal may be awarded for long service and good conduct to prison service staff of all ranks, who on or after 28 October 1955, have completed eighteen years of continuous qualifying service. Previous qualifying service in the Prison Service of other colonies or territories may be counted towards the required period. Service with the police may be counted if it is continuous with service with the prison services.

Clasps are granted to recipients of the medal who complete twenty-five years qualifying service, and a subsequent clasp on completing thirty-five years of qualifying service. In undress, when only ribbons are worn, these clasps are represented by silver rosettes attached to the ribbon.

A recipient who is convicted of a criminal offence or dismissed for misconduct would forfeit the medal.

== Appearance ==
The medal is circular, silver, and 36 mm (1.4 in) in diameter. The obverse bears the crowned effigy of Elizabeth II surrounded by the royal titles. The reverse depicts a phoenix rising out of flames and flying upwards toward the sun. Around the edge at the top are the words, COLONIAL PRISON SERVICE and below are the words FOR LONG SERVICE & GOOD CONDUCT, the top inscription changing to OVERSEAS TERRITORIES PRISON SERVICE in 2012. The name and details of the recipient are inscribed on the rim of the medal.

The 32 mm (1.3 in) wide ribbon is worn from a ring suspender and is green with a narrow white stripe in the centre and wide edges of dark blue. The clasp for further service is attached to the ribbon and is silver and decorated with a spray of laurel.
