= Cecil Thomas (sculptor) =

English sculptor and medallist (1885–1976)

Cecil Thomas OBE FRBS
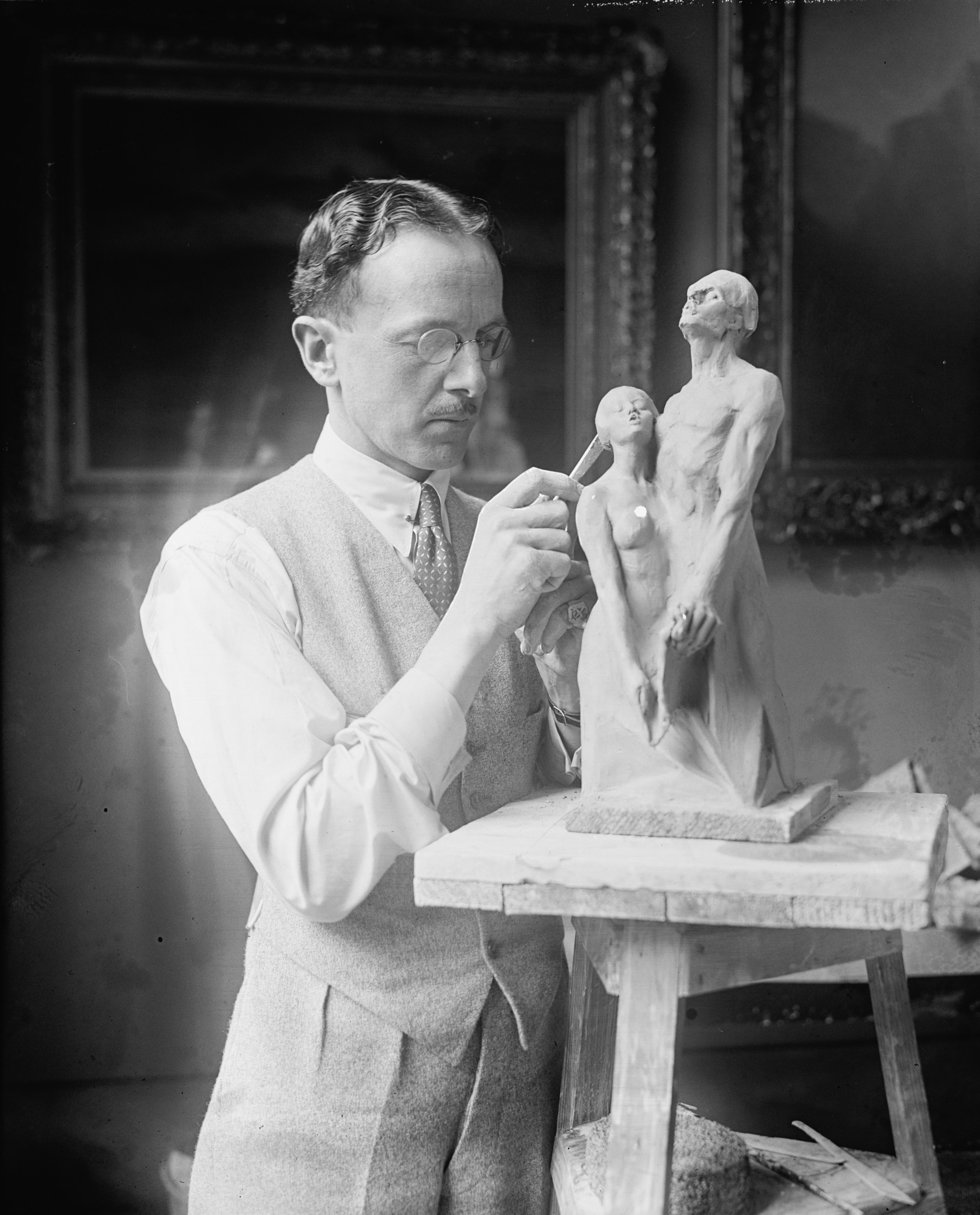
- Sculpting in 1925
- Born: 3 March 1885; Shepherd's Bush, London
- Died: 16 September 1976 (aged 91); London
- Known for: Medallist, sculptor
- Notable work: Bromhead Memorial; Queen Elizabeth II Coronation Medal
- Movement: Arts and Crafts

Cecil Walter Thomas, OBE FRBS, (3 March 1885 – 16 September 1976) was a British sculptor and medallist. As a sculptor, he created many private memorials for display in churches and cemeteries and as a medallist was regularly commissioned by the Royal Mint.

== Early career ==
Thomas was born in the Shepherd's Bush area of London to John Thomas, a seal engraver, and Alice Sophia Thomas (née Ings). As a teenager, Cecil became an apprentice in his father's practice and continued working for his father while studying at the Slade School of Fine Art, Heatherley School of Fine Art, and the Central School of Arts and Crafts. In his early career, he specialised in gem engraving, receiving commissions from all over the world, including several from the House of Fabergé. Nonetheless, his work in creating cameo portraits inspired his interest in medals and coins; he was one of the few artists to engrave directly into the die. Among his earliest works were a small medal in 1899 for Sesame house (now held by the British Museum), and a carnelian intaglio seal for London County Council and an intaglio portrait of Sir Henry Irving, both dating from 1905. He began accepting commissions on his own account by the time he was in his mid-twenties, and created several cast-bronze medals. His medal for the Surrey Rose Club (1909) attracted particular acclaim, which he followed with the Oxford millenary medal (1912), which exemplifies Thomas' interpretation of the Arts and Crafts Movement.

Thomas was a regular exhibitor at the Royal Academy, starting in 1909, and at the Royal Society of Miniature Painters, Sculptors and Gravers, of which he became an associate in 1914 and a fellow the following year. He also exhibited at the Grosvenor Gallery in London, the Walker Art Gallery in Liverpool, Manchester City Gallery, the Salon in Paris, and at shows in the United States.

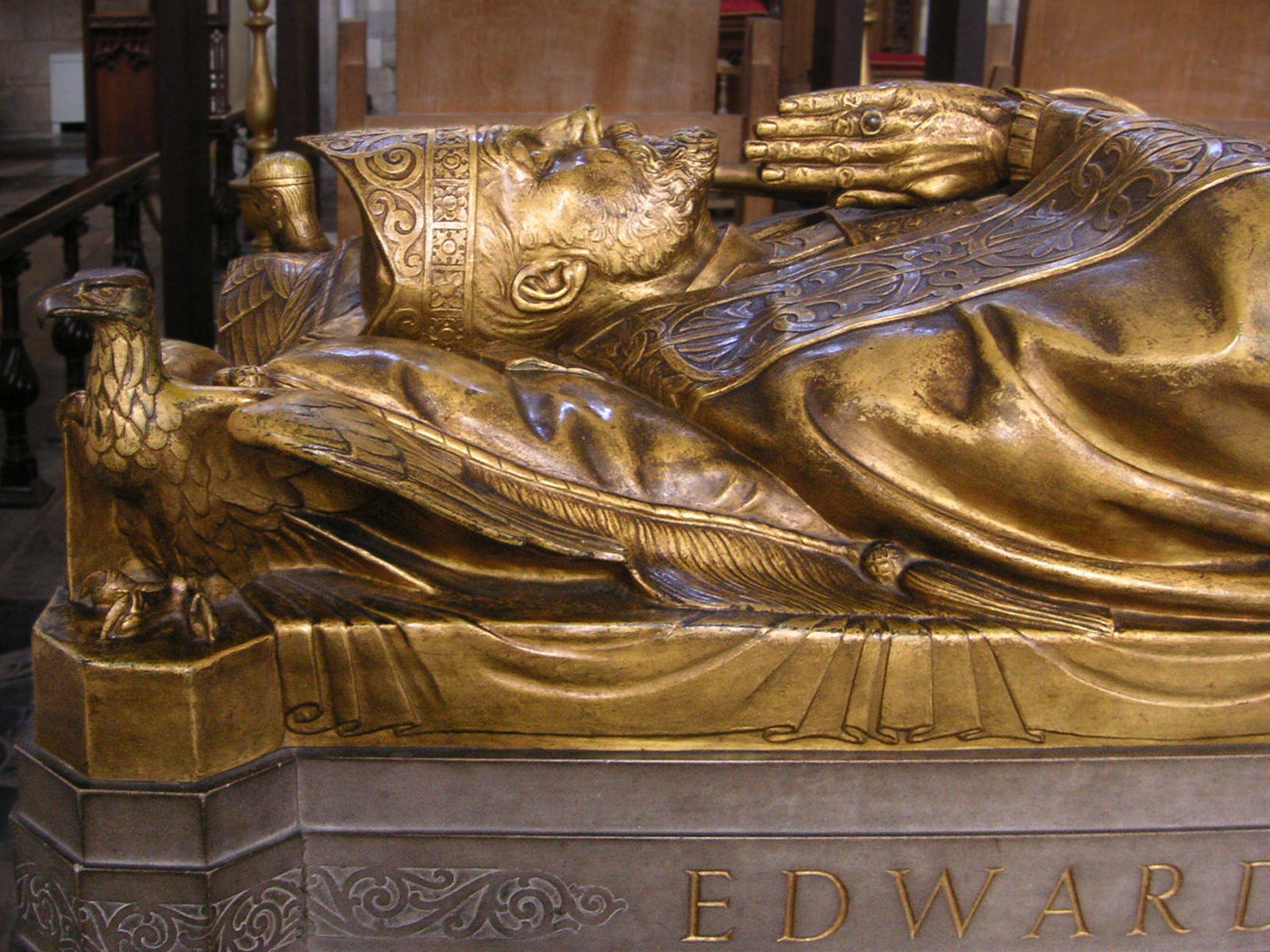
Thomas' effigy of Bishop Talbot in Southwark Cathedral

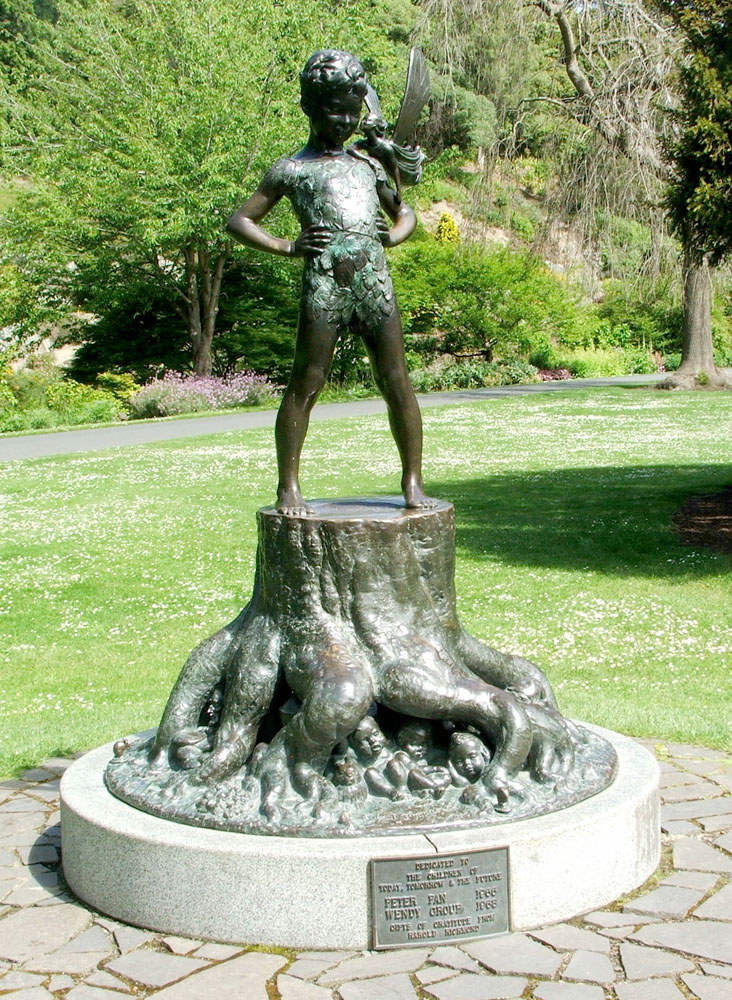
Thomas' statue of Peter Pan in the Dunedin Botanic Garden, New Zealand

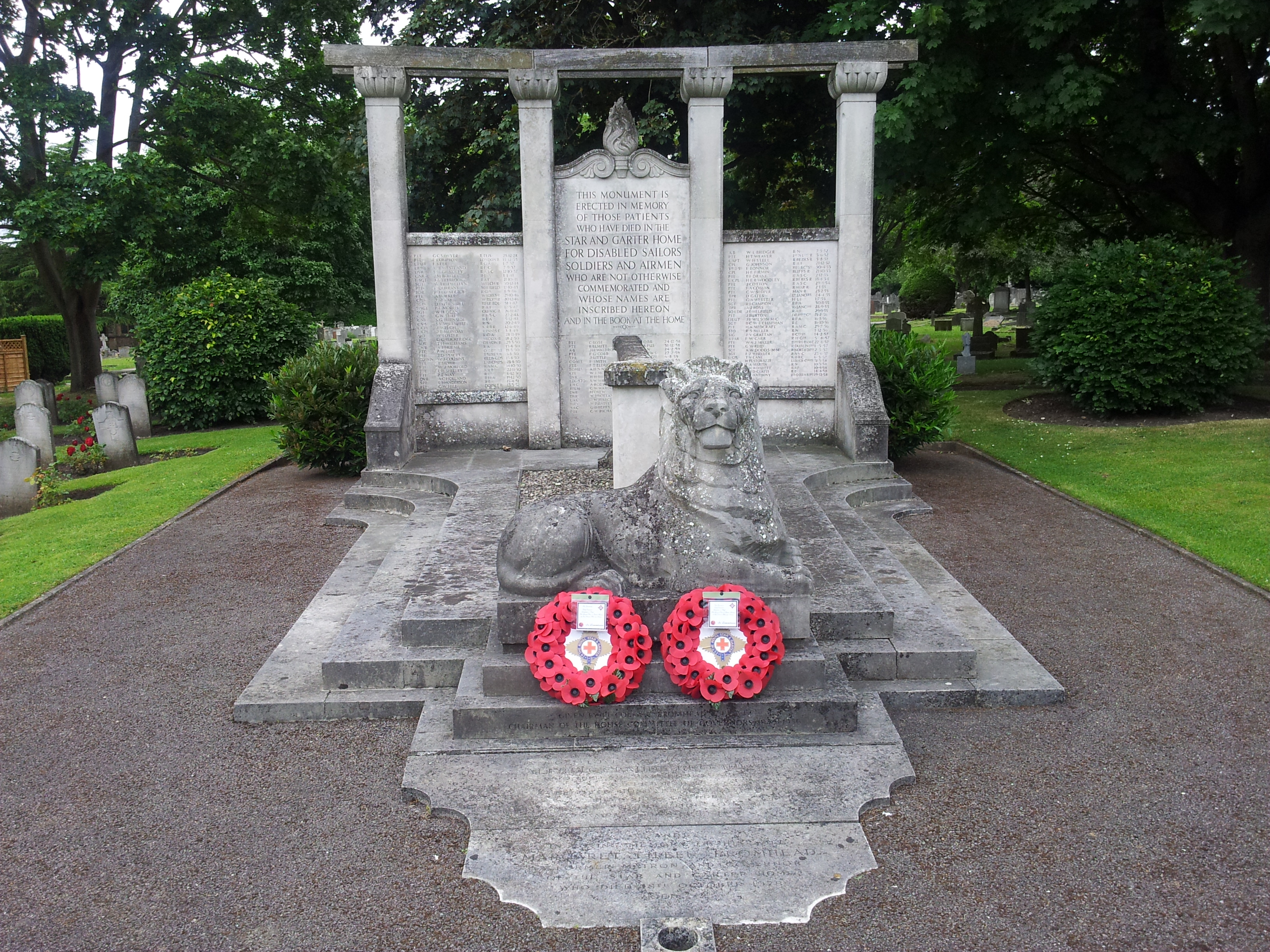
Bromhead Memorial at Richmond Cemetery for deceased residents of the Royal Star and Garter Home not commemorated elsewhere

During the First World War, Thomas joined the British Army, initially serving as a staff officer. He was observed by his superiors using sand models to demonstrate plans to his men and transferred to a military intelligence position. He was seriously wounded later in the war and returned to his medal-making during his recovery. After the war, he received a commission for a recumbent effigy from a lord and lady, in memory of their two sons. This resulted in many more commissions for funerary bronze effigies. Several are on display in churches including All Hallows-by-the-Tower in the City of London; Christ Church Cathedral in Newcastle, New South Wales; and Exbury Church in Hampshire. As well as private memorials, Thomas created effigies of multiple public figures, including Randall Davidson, Archbishop of Canterbury, in Canterbury Cathedral; Bishop Edward Talbot in Southwark Cathedral; Admiral Philip Nelson-Ward at Boxgrove Priory church; and Reverend Prebendary Boyd in St Alban's Church, Teddington. He also designed a war memorials for the St John Ambulance Brigade at St John's Gate, Clerkenwell. He was made a fellow of the Royal Society of British Sculptors (now the Royal Society of Sculptors) in 1938.

Thomas volunteered for the Royal Air Force at the outbreak the Second World War, serving in the model-making section at RAF Medmenham in Buckinghamshire, interpreting aerial photographs into terrain models. He was demobilised in 1945, having reached the age of 60.

== Later career ==
In 1946, Thomas became Master of the Art Workers Guild and in 1953 was appointed an Officer of the Order of the British Empire.

In his later career, Thomas received many commissions for coins and medals from the Royal Mint. Upon the coronation of Queen Elizabeth II in 1953, Thomas won the competition to design the new coinage but in the end his designs were only used on two British coins, the florin (two shillings) and the sixpence, and Thomas was asked to refine the designs of other artists. Nonetheless, his designs were used on coinage in several Commonwealth countries including Hong Kong and Nigeria. Disaffected by his experience, Thomas declined a commission to design Britain's post-decimalisation coinage.

Despite his disaffection with coin-making, Thomas continued to design many medals for the Royal Mint, including the Queen Elizabeth II Coronation Medal, the Queen's Service Medal (New Zealand), and seal for Church of England bishops. He also accepted numerous private commissions. Among Thomas' later commissions were the Bromhead Memorial in Richmond Cemetery (1957) and several large bronzes destined for New Zealand, one of which was received by King's College in Auckland. The other two were near-identical sculptures of Peter Pan. The earlier of these was commissioned for the Dunedin Botanic Garden (unveiled in 1965). This inspired the commissioning of a second one to stand at Rotokawau Virginia Lake in Whanganui (unveiled in 1967). The Dunedin sculpture is accompanied by a second Thomas sculpture nearby showing other characters from the Peter Pan story.

== Personal life and death ==
Thomas moved into Kensington House, 108 Old Brompton Road in Kensington in 1919, initially renting the property and later buying it. He lived there and used the building as his studio until his death. In 1930 he married Dora Margaret (née Pearson), the daughter of an alderman. The couple had one son, Anthony. Thomas was a freemason and a devout follower of the Church of England. He regularly attended St Bride's Church in the City of London and later St Mary The Boltons near his home. Dora died in 1967, after which, with the help of the Royal Society of British Sculptors (which changed its name in 2003 to the Royal British Society of Sculptors), Thomas set up the Dora Trust in her name, dedicated to the advancement of British sculpture. From the 1970s, he provided a room in his home for the use of the RBS as an office, for which he was awarded the society's gold medal.

Thomas died at home on 16 September 1976. His son gifted Kensington House (by then renamed Dora House) to the Society to use as their headquarters and an exhibition space. His collection of proofs is now held by the British Museum whilst his archive is with the Royal Society of Sculptors.
