= Candahar, Ghuznee, Cabul Medal =

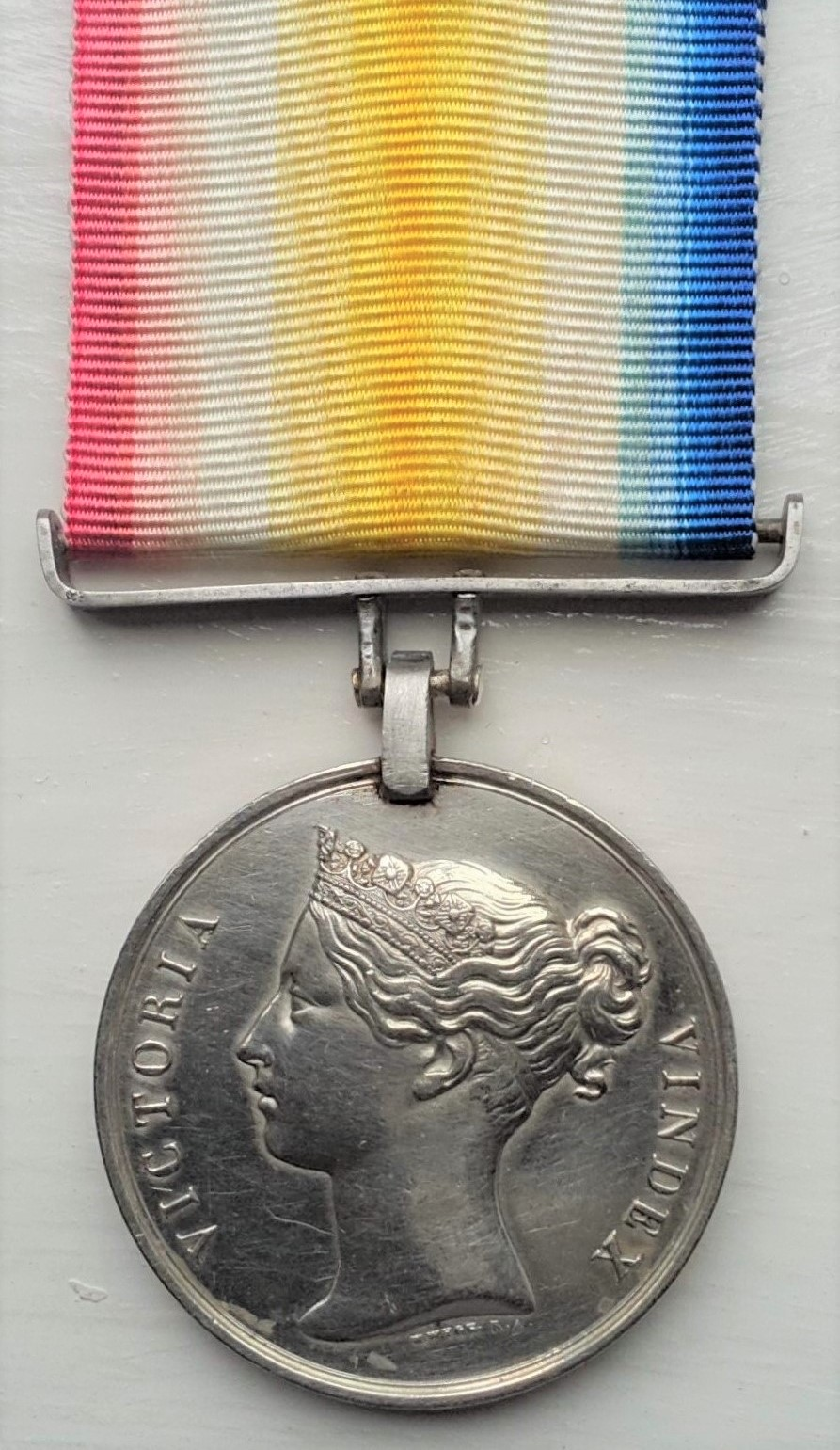
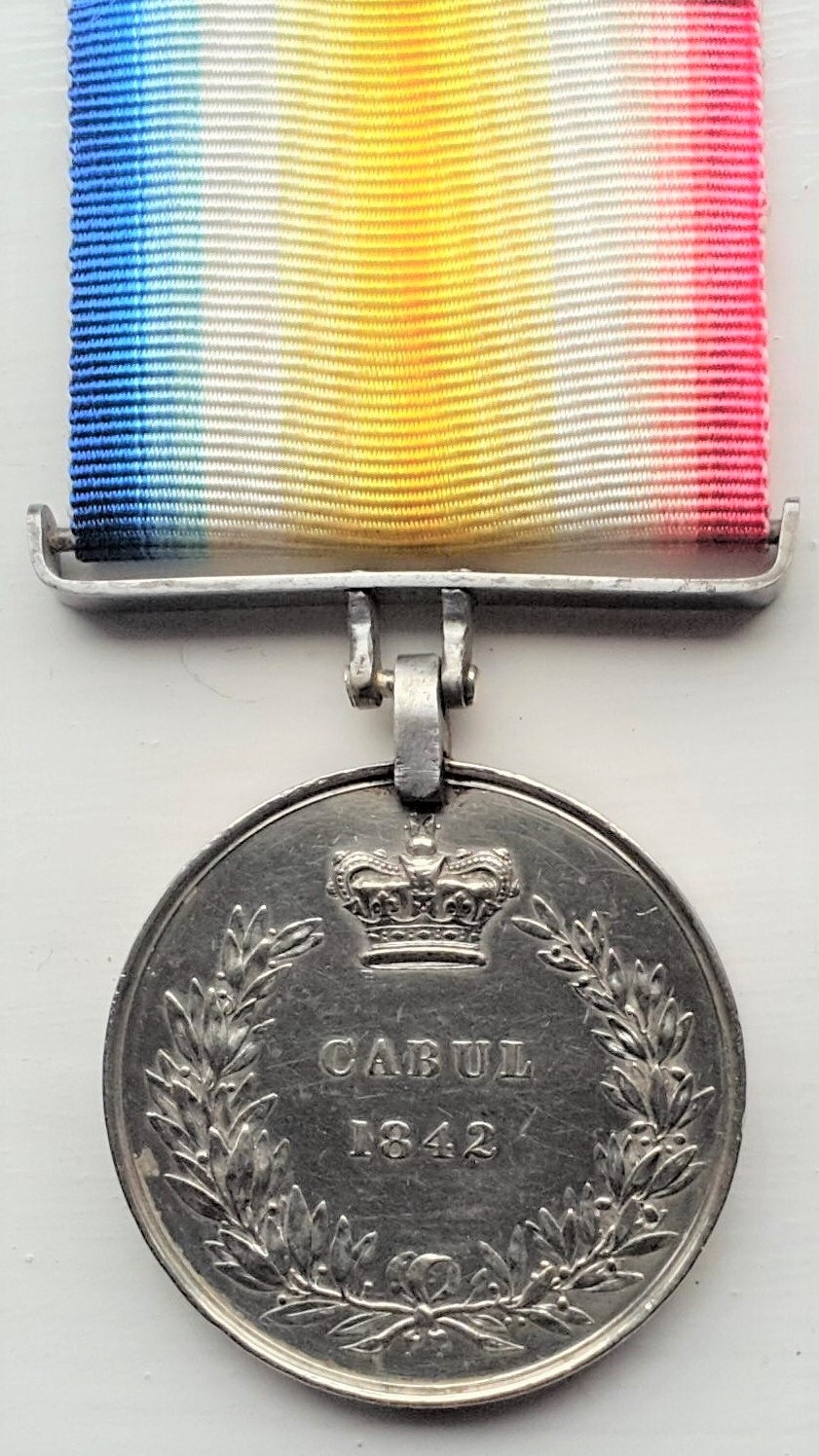
- Obverse, and reverse of the 'Cabul' version
- Type: Campaign Medal
- Country: United Kingdom
- Presented by: British East India Company
- Campaigns: Kabul Expedition, First Afghan War
- Clasps: None
- Established: 1842
- Ribbon bar of the medal

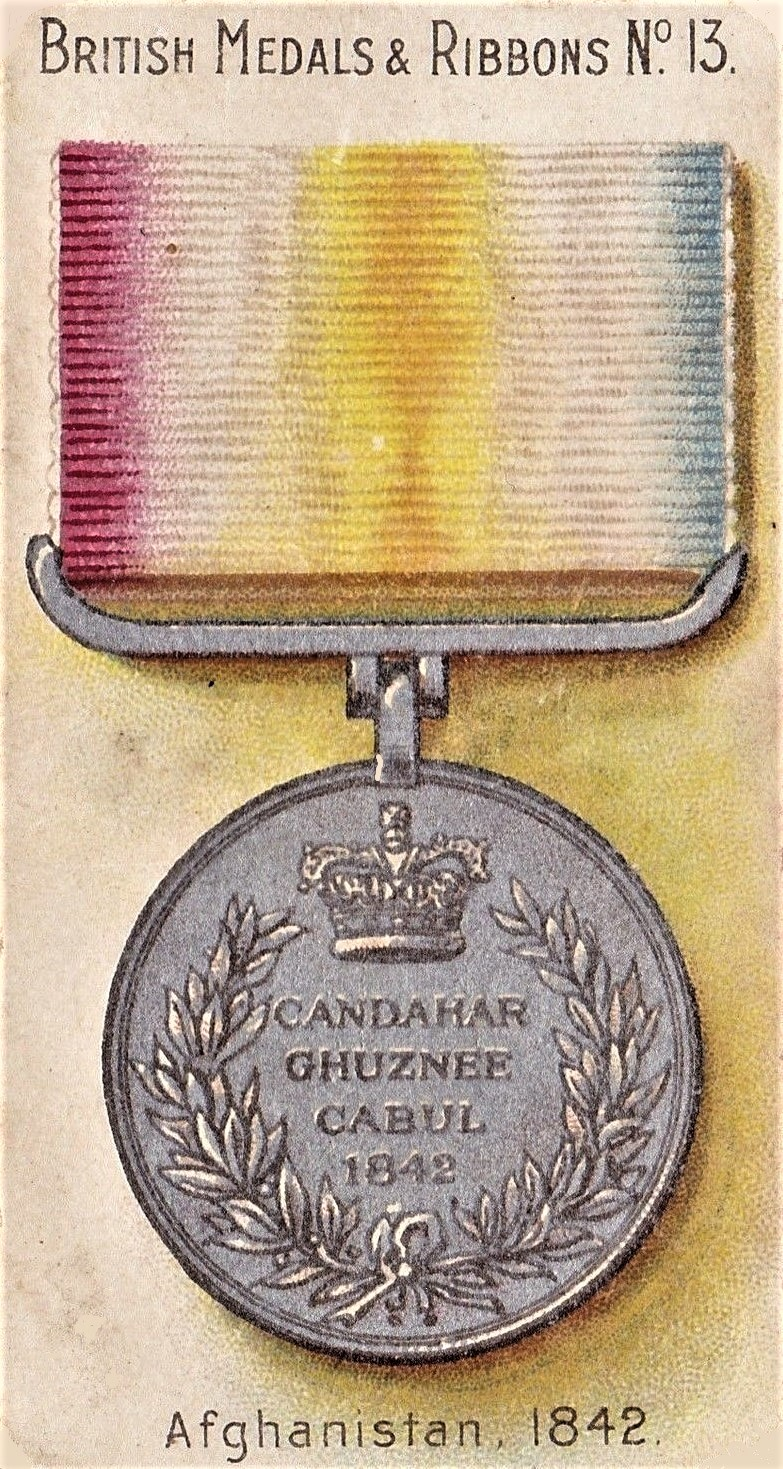
Reverse of Candahar, Ghuznee, Cabul version

The Candahar, Ghuznee, Cabul Medal was awarded to those who took part in the campaign in the spring and summer of 1842, under the command of General William Nott, to restore British standing in Afghanistan after earlier defeats during the First Anglo-Afghan War.

The medal was approved by General Order at Simla by the Honourable East India Company on 4 October 1842. Approximately 22,100 were awarded, about 4,400 to members of the British Army and 17,700 to the mainly native forces of the Honourable East India Company.

== Appearance ==
The medal, designed by William Wyon, was silver and 36 millimetres (1.4 in) in diameter, with the following design:
The obverse shows the diademed head Queen Victoria facing left with the inscription 'VICTORIA VINDEX', Vindex translating as 'Protector'.
Four different reverses were struck, indicating the campaigns in which the recipient served:
'CANDAHAR 1842' within a laurel wreath, surmounted by a crown. For operations around Kandahar from March to May 1842. Slightly over 2,600 were awarded.
'CABUL 1842' within a laurel wreath, surmounted by a crown. For the advance on Kabul, culminating in the city's capture on 15 September 1842. Approximately 12,750 were awarded.
'GHUZNEE' 'CABUL', each within a separate laurel wreath, surmounted by a single crown and with the year '1842' below. For the forces who defeated the Afghans at Ghuznee on 30 August and who then advanced on Kabul. About 1,520 were awarded.
'CANDAHAR, GHUZNEE, CABUL 1842' within a single laurel wreath, surmounted by a crown. For those present at all three campaigns. Slightly over 5,200 were awarded.

The suspension consists of a straight steel suspender, attached to the medal by way of a steel clip and pin. Some recipients later replaced this with a more ornate silver suspension.

The ribbon is the watered rainbow coloured ribbon common to most East India Company medals, with a pattern of red, white, yellow, white and blue.

The recipient's name and regiment were engraved on the edge for the medal.

While no official clasps were awarded, 'Marzenia 1842' and 'Tazeane 1842' were sometimes privately added to the ribbon of the Cabul medal.

In addition, two erroneous strikings were made. In one 'VICTORIA REGINA' rather than 'VICTORIA VINDEX' appears on the obverse; in the other the reverse reads 'CABVL 1842', 15 of these medals are known to have been issued.

== Anglo-Afghan War ==
Four separate campaign medals were awarded to British led forces who served in the Afghan War of 1839 to 1842:

- Ghuznee Medal. Storming of Ghuznee fortress, 21–23 July 1839.
- Jellalabad Medal. Defence of Jalalabad, 12 November 1841 – 7 April 1842.
- Medal for the Defence of Kelat-I-Ghilzie. Defence of Kelat-I-Ghilzie, January–26 May 1842.
- Candahar, Ghuznee, Cabul Medal. Major operations of 1842, the final year of the war.
