= Jellalabad Medals =

Medal of the First Afghan War

Jellalabad Medal
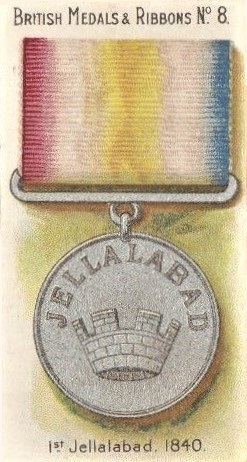
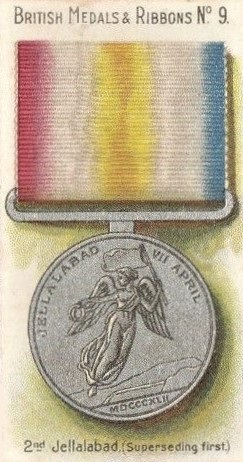
- Left: Obverse, first type. Right: Reverse, second type
- Type: Campaign Medal
- Country: United Kingdom
- Presented by: British East India Company
- Campaign: First Anglo-Afghan War
- Clasps: None
- Established: 30 April 1842

Highlights
- Total: 2,596
- Ribbon bar of the medal

The Jellalabad Medal was a campaign medal issued by the British East India Company. It was established by Lord Ellenborough, the Governor-General of India, on 30 April 1842.
The medal was awarded for the defence of Jalalabad from 12 November 1841 to 7 April 1842, during the First Afghan War, to the troops under the command of Sir Robert Sale. About 2,600 soldiers took part, including the 13th Foot (the only British Army unit present), the 35th Bengal Native Infantry, as well as detachments from other Indian Army units and some loyal Afghan forces.

In addition to the medal, the 13th Foot were permitted to show a Mural Crown and the battle honour 'Jellalabad' on its colours and regimental badge.

== Appearance ==
Two different versions of the Jellalabad Medal were awarded.

The original medal was produced by the Calcutta Mint. It is silver and 39 millimetres (1.5 in) in diameter.
Obverse: A mural crown with 'JELLALABAD' above.
Reverse: The date 'VII APRIL 1842' over three lines.
Suspension: A straight steel suspender attached to the medal by way of a steel clip. This original suspension was often replaced by a more decorative version.
Naming: Issued unnamed, the medal was often named privately. The medals awarded to the 13th Foot had the name and regiment of the recipient engraved at their commanding officer's expense.

Lord Ellenborough was dissatisfied with the design and execution of this version and, although awarded to serving soldiers, insufficient were produced to issue to next of kin of those who had died during the campaign. The East India Company therefore decided to strike a further issue of a new design. Although those in receipt of the original medal could exchange for the new medal, few did so with, for example, only five men of the 13th Foot opting to exchange.

The second version of the medal was designed by William Wyon and produced by the Royal Mint in London. It is silver and 36 millimetres (1.4 in) in diameter.
Obverse: The diademed head Queen Victoria facing left with the inscription 'VICTORIA VINDEX' (PROTECTOR).
Reverse: a winged figure of Victory flying over the fortress at Jellalabad. Above is the inscription 'JELLALABAD VII APRIL' with below the year 'MDCCCXLII'.
Suspension: A straight suspender attached to the medal by way of a steel clip. Many recipients replaced this with a more ornate silver suspension.
Naming: The recipient's name and regiment were impressed on the edge in block capitals.

The ribbon of both versions was a watered rainbow pattern of red, white, yellow, white and blue common to most East India Company medals.
No clasp was awarded with either medal.

== Anglo-Afghan War ==
Four separate campaign medals were awarded to British led forces who served in the Afghan War of 1839 to 1842:

- Ghuznee Medal. Storming of Ghuznee fortress, 21–23 July 1839.
- Jellalabad Medal. Defence of Jalalabad, 12 November 1841–7 April 1842.
- Medal for the Defence of Kelat-I-Ghilzie. Defence of Kelat-I-Ghilzie, January–26 May 1842.
- Candahar, Ghuznee, Cabul Medal. Major operations of 1842, the final year of the war.
