= Medal for the Defence of Kelat-I-Ghilzie =

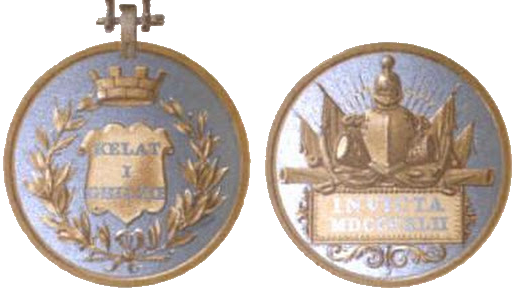
- Obverse and reverse of the medal
- Type: Campaign Medal
- Country: United Kingdom
- Presented by: British East India Company
- Campaign: First Anglo-Afghan War
- Clasps: None
- Established: 4 October 1842

Highlights
- Total recipients: 932
- Ribbon bar.

The Kelat-I-Ghilzie Medal is a campaign medal issued by the British East India Company, to the defenders of the fort at Kelat-I-Ghilzie during the First Anglo-Afghan War.

== History ==
After the massacre of General Elphinstone's Army during the 1842 retreat from Kabul, the only forces left in Afghanistan were at Jalalabad and Kelat-I-Ghilzie, a fort between Kabul and Kandahar. The garrison numbering 932, (55 Europeans and 877 Natives), consisted of Shah Shoja's 3rd Infantry Battalion, three companies of the 43rd Bengal Native Infantry, forty European gunners, sixty Bombay Sappers and Miners, and eight British officers, all under the command of Captain John Halket Craigie. All were members of the Indian Army, with no British Army units present. For most of the winter, the garrison was besieged under very difficult circumstances. Finally, on 19 May 1842, a force was sent to draw off the garrison and relieve them from their post. Before the relief force arrived, the garrison repulsed one final major attack by some six thousand Afghans on 21 May 1842. A few days after this attack the garrison was finally relieved by the forces under Sir William Nott, on 26 May 1842. For the courage displayed by the garrison at Kelat-i-Ghilzie, the East India Company, on 4 October 1842, authorised the medal to be awarded to all troops who participated in the protracted siege. A testament to the distinguished service of the native troops is evident in the fact that the troops of Shah Shoja's 3rd Infantry Battalion were taken into the Bengal Army as the Kelat-i-Ghilzie Regiment.

== Description ==
The medal, designed by William Wyon, was silver and 36 millimetres (1.4 in) in diameter, with the following design:
The obverse contains a laurel wreath with mural crown at the top of a shield with the inscription KELAT-I-GHILZIE.
The reverse has a trophy of arms on top of a plaque bearing the inscription 'INVICTA MDCCCXLII'.
The suspension consists of a straight steel suspender, attached to the medal by way of a steel clip and pin.
The ribbon is the watered rainbow coloured ribbon common to most East India Company medals. It is red on the left edge fading into white, which changed to yellow in the centre, fading back to white, until finally changing to blue at the right edge.
The name of the recipient was engraved in script on the edge of the medals issued to British personnel. Medals issued to indigenous troops were often not named.

== Medals of the Anglo-Afghan War ==
Four separate campaign medals were awarded to British led forces who served in the Afghan War of 1839 to 1842:

- Ghuznee Medal. Storming of Ghuznee fortress, 21–23 July 1839.
- Jellalabad Medal. Defence of Jalalabad, 12 November 1841 – 7 April 1842.
- Medal for the Defence of Kelat-I-Ghilzie. Defence of Kelat-I-Ghilzie, February–26 May 1842.
- Candahar, Ghuznee, Cabul Medal. Major operations of 1842, the final year of the war.
