= Wigginton, Staffordshire =

Village in Staffordshire, England

Coordinates: 52.6583°N 1.6917°W

Wigginton
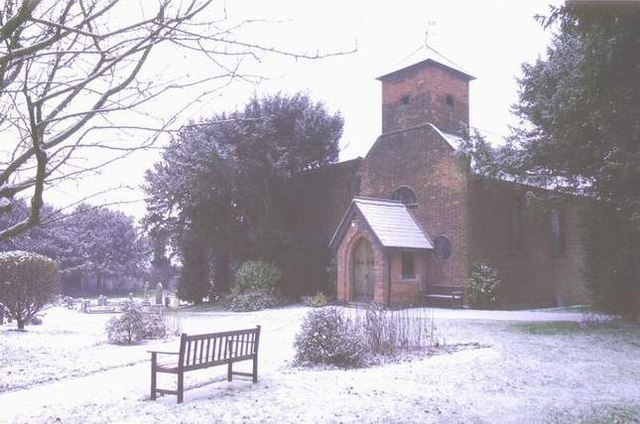
- St Leonard's Church, Wigginton

- Location within Staffordshire
- OS grid reference: SK208067
- Civil parish: Wigginton and Hopwas
- District: Lichfield
- Shire county: Staffordshire
- Region: West Midlands
- Country: England
- Sovereign state: United Kingdom
- Post town: TAMWORTH
- Postcode district: B79
- Dialling code: 01827
- Police: Staffordshire
- Fire: Staffordshire
- Ambulance: West Midlands
- UK Parliament: Tamworth

Wigginton is a village and former civil parish, now in the parish of Wigginton and Hopwas, in the Lichfield district, in the county of Staffordshire, England.

== History ==
The name Wigginton is believed to come from Old English, and to mean Wicga's farm. The name was also sometimes written as Wiggington. The village lies on a medieval trade route, the Portway, possibly used for transporting salt from the River Mease at Edingale to Tamworth.

Ecclesiastically, Wigginton had been a chapelry attached to the parish of St Editha in Tamworth. For civil government it had been a township – the township was more than just the village, and included the hamlets of Comberford and Coton, the latter now part of the borough of Tamworth. In 1866 the township became a civil parish, and in 1894 part of Tamworth Rural District, in 1934 it became part of Lichfield Rural District. On 1 April 1934, the parish of Hopwas Hays was merged with Wigginton, parts of Wigginton were moved to Fisherwick and Harlaston. On 1 September 1993, the new parish was renamed to "Wigginton & Hopwas". In 1931 the parish of Wigginton (prior to the merge) had a population of 2291.

In 1861 the population of Wigginton township was 670, on 3,470 acres (1,400 ha). This figure included inmates of the Tamworth workhouse, which at that time lay within the township. The population of the chapelry alone was 466.

== Landmarks ==
Grade II listed buildings in Wigginton village include two or three houses and the former Anglican chapel, now a church. Dedicated to St Leonard, it was rebuilt in 1777, extended in 1830, and altered again in 1861 to a design by Nicholas Joyce.

Situated within the modern village is a shrunken medieval village, visible as a series of pronounced earthworks to the northern end of the village, and medieval ridge and furrow still to be seen in surrounding fields. To the south-west of the village is the former site, now ploughed out, of a likely Bronze Age barrow formerly known as "Robin Hood's Butt". Several finds of archaeological interest have been made in the area around the village. To the north-west is a flat area formerly called the "Money Lands", where human bones and ancient coins, thought to be Roman, were recovered in a find made in the 18th century.

== Amenities ==
The village contains a pub, the Old Crown, and a Church of England primary school, St Leonard's. The pub called The Wigginton is over the border in Tamworth, as is Wigginton Park, the home of Tamworth RUFC.

== Notable people ==
- John Burnet Biddulph (1796–1837), a Cape Colony explorer and trader who arrived with the 1820 Settlers.
- Samuel Parkes (c. 1815–1864), a Wigginton-born private in the 4th Light Dragoons won the Victoria Cross in the Charge of the Light Brigade for saving the life of Trumpeter Hugh Crawford.
- Gene Kemp (1926–2015), children's author, was born in Wigginton.

== See also ==
- Listed buildings in Wigginton and Hopwas
