= Samuel Parkes (VC) =

Recipient of the Victoria Cross

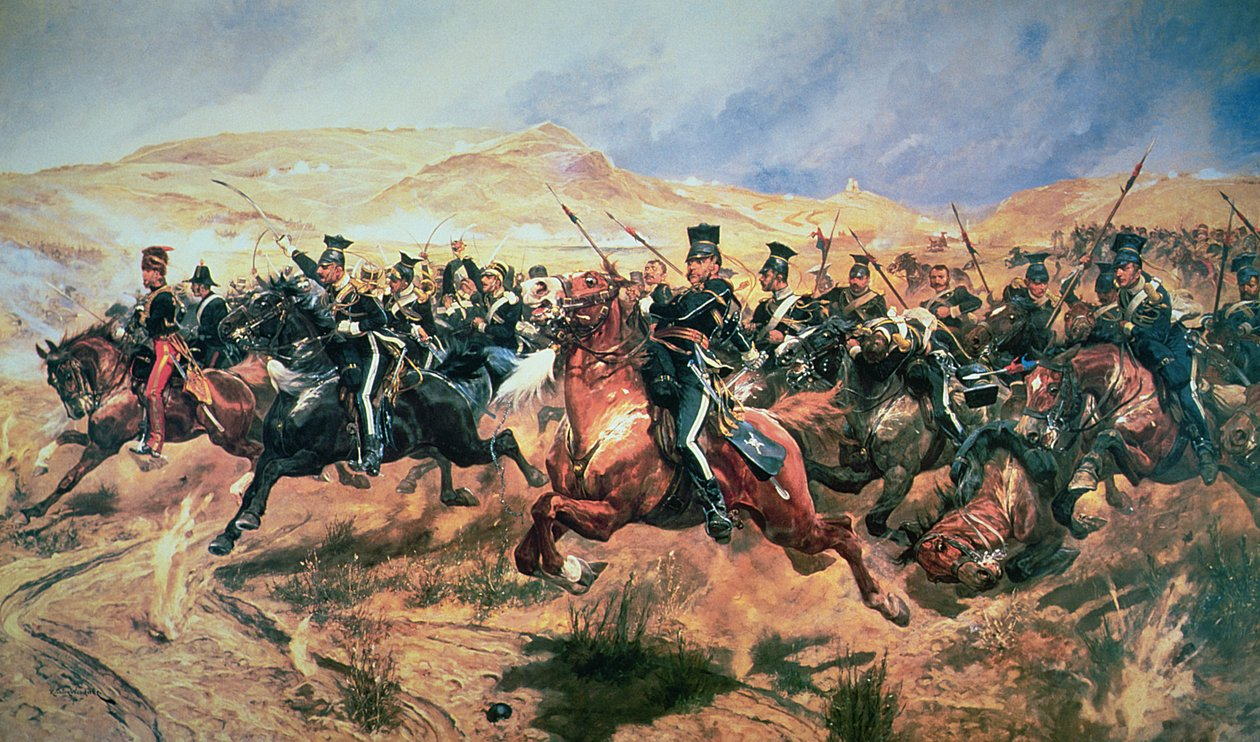
- The Charge of the Light Brigade, 1894 painting by Richard Caton Woodville Jr.
- Born: c.1815 Wigginton, Staffordshire
- Died: 15 November 1864 (aged 49); Stanhope Lodge, Hyde Park, London, London
- Burial place: Brompton Cemetery, London
- Military career
- Allegiance: United Kingdom
- Branch: British Army
- Service years: 1831 - 1857
- Rank: Private
- Unit: 4th Queens Own Light Dragoons
- Conflicts: First Anglo-Afghan War; Crimean War
- Awards: Victoria Cross

Samuel Parkes VC (probably late 1815 – 15 November 1864) was an English recipient of the Victoria Cross, the highest and most prestigious award for gallantry in the face of the enemy that can be awarded to British and Commonwealth forces. Parkes was awarded his VC for his actions during the Charge of the Light Brigade.

== Details ==
Born in Wigginton, Tamworth, Staffordshire probably in late 1815, he was baptised at the Church of St Editha, Tamworth on 24 December 1815, the son of Thomas Parks/Parkes and Lydia Fearn/Fern/Fearns; no exact date of birth has been established. Within the family, it is said that he was known as "George". He had two sisters, Elizabeth (baptised 1812) and Mary (baptised 1819); no other siblings are recorded in St Editha's baptismal register.

He died on 14 November 1864 at Stanhope Lodge, Hyde Park, London. He was buried in Brompton Cemetery, London in an unmarked pauper's grave (no. 39265, reference R80'6" x 109' 3") on 19 November 1864 after a funeral at St George's, Hanover Square. A memorial stone was placed on his grave in May 1999, thanks to the efforts of Peter Elkin, and a plaque was placed in Tamworth parish church on Balaklava Day 2004. A new memorial was unveiled in the village of his birth on 14 September 2011 following a fund-raising campaign by the people of Wigginton.

According to the Army, he was born in 1813. His own declaration on enlistment declares his age as 18 years old while his discharge papers state precisely that he was 44 years 3 months (i.e. he was born in August or September 1813). His death certificate and the Brompton Cemetery burial register both say, however, that he was aged 49 at death, in which case he was born in 1815. The years around 1830 were a time of agricultural depression in England so, like many before and since, the 16-year-old lad might have lied about his age to enlist in a secure job with reasonable pay. Furthermore, birth and baptism usually followed each other rapidly at that time. On balance, 1815 would seem to be the more likely year of his birth.

== Early career ==
Described as a labourer, he enlisted in the 4th Queens Own Light Dragoons on 30 July 1831 and was discharged on 1 December 1857 with four good conduct badges, as an out-pensioner of Chelsea Hospital. He served 11 years with the 4th Light Dragoons in India, including the First Afghan War (Ghunzee medal), and in the Crimean War. Peacetime service with the 4th saw Parkes in Wales and Ireland as well as in England. At Balaklava, he was serving as an orderly to the regimental commanding officer, Colonel Lord George Paget.

Parkes' discharge papers show a chequered military career. He earned four good conduct badges, but he won and lost the first badge five times between 1838 and 1850 (i.e. covering his entire service in India and more). He gained the second only in January 1852 and then lost it the same year, regaining it in 1853. He then managed to gain a third in November 1855 and was awarded the fourth only on 18 November 1857 (four days after his discharge Board). In addition, he was sentenced to 56 days imprisonment in Galway Gaol in 1848 by a district court martial in Ireland. Parkes was confined on 9 November 1848, convicted on 21 November 1848 and released on 15 January 1849 – so in addition to his 56-day sentence he was in prison for 11 days before conviction. The offence itself is not specified in the Regimental Muster Roll. Neither is it mentioned in Parkes' discharge papers. But papers catalogued in The National Archives as WO 86/6 show that he was found guilty of being 'drunk on duty' and was one of three privates from his regiment so convicted on the same day – one also received 56 days but the other was sentenced to 70 days. This blemished record explains why Parkes was not awarded the Army Long Service and Good Conduct Medal, which for the cavalry then required 20 years of irreproachable character.

Parkes thus remained a Private in the 4th Light Dragoons (from 1861, the 4th Hussars - The Queen's Own) throughout his career.

== Balaclava and the Victoria Cross ==
He won his VC on 25 October 1854 in the Charge of the Light Brigade during the Battle of Balaklava during the Crimean War, when the following deed took place for which he was awarded the VC:

On 25 October 1854 at Balaclava, Crimean Peninsula, (Charge of the Light Brigade)

4th Light Dragoons No. 635 Private Samuel Parkes In the charge of the Light Cavalry Brigade at Balaklava, Trumpet-Major Crawford's horse fell, and dismounted him, and he lost his sword; he was attacked by two Cossacks, when Private Samuel Parkes (whose horse had been shot) saved his life, by placing himself between them and the Trumpet-Major, and drove them away by his sword. In attempting to follow the Light Cavalry Brigade in the retreat, they were attacked by six Russians, whom Parkes kept at bay, and retired slowly, fighting, and defending the Trumpet-Major for some time, until deprived of his sword by a shot.

The VC citation refers to Hugh Crawford as being a Trumpet Major, but he was not promoted to that rank until 1 December 1855.

Elkin claims to own the sword which Parkes carried at Balaklava. The sword may have belonged to Parkes at some point in his military career, but it cannot be the one that he used on 25 October 1854 at Balaklava because the VC citation clearly states that Parkes was "deprived of his sword with a shot" and then taken prisoner. What is more, the 4th Light Dragoons had not at that point been equipped with the 1853 pattern light cavalry sabre. Parkes won his VC that day armed with an 1829 pattern light cavalry.

Parkes and Crawford were held as Russian prisoners until 26 October 1855 - which makes Parkes the very first prisoner of war VC. Joseph Grigg, who charged with the 4th Light Dragoons at Balaklava, in his article "The Charge of the Six Hundred" reports that "Parks told us that he and some others were taken to St. Petersburg, where they were well treated, and allowed eight pence a day each for food, which was very cheap."

Bizarrely, the website of his own regiment's museum undermines the validity of his award by stating "While not detracting from Samuel Parkes’ valour in the charge, it should be remembered that the early awards of the V.C. were often made, not for the specific valour of the soldier, but because he was selected by his comrades. Parkes’ Victoria Cross may be considered as a representative award." Nothing supports such an erroneous claim. Although the original VC warrant allowed for awards by ballot for acts performed by a body of men, that provision was never used for any Crimean War VC. Rather, individual Crimean recommendations were made by commanding officers of individual regiments and then subject to rigorous consideration by a selection board of senior officers.

== Later life ==
On leaving the army after 26 years 58 days reckonable service (i.e. excluding the period in gaol in 1848), he was appointed a warder at Hampton Court, with a pension of 1/1d as an out-pensioner of Chelsea Hospital. He subsequently became the Inspector of the Park Constables in Hyde Park. At one time he worked out of the constables' station inside Marble Arch.

He married Ann Jeffrey on 13 February 1858 at St George's, Hanover Square, London; their marriage certificate records that both were then living in Oxford Street. They had no children. As far as is known, he had not been married before.

Parkes was one of a number of Light Brigade survivors who in the spring of 1863 swore an affidavit in the celebrated libel case of Cardigan v Calthorpe. His evidence was one of 15 affidavits collected by Calthorpe, the defendant.

His discharge papers describe him as 6 ft 2 ins tall with a "fair" complexion, grey eyes and "light" hair.

Parkes was the oldest man to win the VC in the Crimean War and is the VC with the earliest campaign medal (Ghuznee 1839).

His death certificate records that he died of apoplexy. His death certificate shows his death was reported by John Sneezum. Was he the John Sneezum who had served as a Private with the 11th Hussars in the Crimean War (regimental number 1432), but probably did not charge at Balaclava? The surname is most unusual.

== Medals ==
Parkes' Victoria Cross and other three medals were once owned by his regiment and displayed in their officers' mess (first the 4th Hussars, then the Queens Royal Irish Hussars and finally the Queens Royal Hussars. They sold them, however, to fund their new regimental museum in Trinity Mews, Priory Rd, Warwick CV34 4NA. The four medals are now in the Lord Ashcroft collection at the Imperial War Museum

The painting of his VC action by Chevalier Desanges is in the regimental museum. In total he was awarded: the Victoria Cross, the Ghuznee Medal, the British Crimean Medal with three clasps (Alma, Balaklava, Sebastopol) and the Turkish Crimean Medal (British variety).

The VC was bought at auction by the officers of the 4th Hussars and presented to the regiment on Balaklava Day 1954 to mark the centenary of the battle. There was once a second VC awarded to Parkes, a replacement following the "loss" (sale by him?) of his original. Bought at Sotheby's on 21 December 1879 (lot 275) for £1-12s-0d by Viscount Dillon, he presented it to the Royal United Service Institute Museum c.1920. The subsequent story of his medals is itself complex. At what date either Parkes, or his family, lost or sold his medals is unknown - although in his regiment the story is that one evening, finding himself without money, he used his VC to pay for several pints of beer. The original VC presented by Queen Victoria in 1857 turned up in 1940 when it was sold in London. It was sold again in 1953 to an anonymous benefactor of the Royal Norfolk Regiment, together with Parkes' Ghuznee medal. He gave them both to their Museum but the Norfolks returned them so that they could be offered to the 4th Hussars - whose officers bought them at auction.

As for the duplicate, the RUSI Museum catalogue (1924 edition), states "Experts have been consulted, but they are unable to say which, on comparing them, is the genuine one." On the closure of that Museum in 1963, "the Green Howards Museum asked if there was a copy / replica V.C. which they could have as a sample medal. The R.U.S.I. allowed the regiment to have the copy of Parkes' V.C. on the strict understanding that on no account was it to be allowed to get onto the market and that when it ceased to be of use as a sample medal, it was to be destroyed, because it was not an original medal, but might have been sold as such by an unscrupulous person. These conditions have been complied with."

To complicate matters further, a second duplicate appears to have existed. When the 4th Hussars' officers bought the original in 1954, the regimental magazine states " Pte. Parkes sold the original, but was given a duplicate which is also in our possession, and which has just been accepted by the Sandhurst Museum on loan from the Regiment.

Both Crimean medals (without the Ghuznee medal or a VC, real or copy), were sold at Sotheby's (part of lot 110), for £3-18s-0d on 21 June 1906 - in a sale at which the Crimean campaign medals of another four Light Brigade men were also sold. Both were sold again at Glendinings (lot 16), on 12 March 1907, for £2-8s-0d and reappeared in their sale rooms twice more, on both occasions with a copy of a VC: on 27 March 1914 (lot 246), when they made £6-15s-0d and on 23 January 1920 (lot 304) when they went for £3-7s-6d. These are presumably the two Crimean medals that in the mid-1950s were somehow reunited with Parkes' Ghuznee medal and his VC and sold to the 4th Hussars. But a second British Crimean campaign medal with three bars named to Parkes exists - it was shown to Sotheby's and verified by them as genuine in 1972/73.

The 4th Light Dragoons' regimental returns in the Crimean Medal Roll [PRO, WO 100/24] show Parkes' entitlement to the clasp for Alma (at f.203 recto) while there is a dash against Inkerman, noting he had been taken prisoner on 25 October. His entitlement to the Balaklava bar is recorded on folio 228 recto. But his name does not appear in the list of those entitled to the Sebastopol clasp (folios 216 recto to 225 recto) - though this was an automatic award for those who had been at Inkermann and/or Balaklava.

== Pictures ==
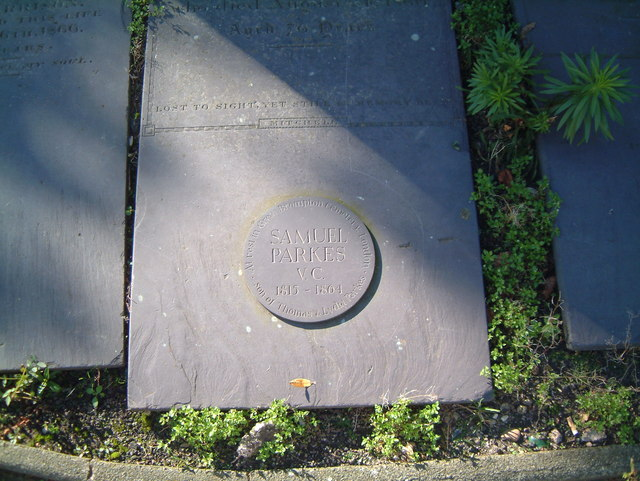
Parkes' Victoria Cross memorial disc at a family grave in Church of St Editha, Tamworth

No photograph of Samuel Parkes is known to exist (unless, by sheer chance, he is one of the privates of the 4th Light Dragoons who appear in a photograph taken at the Cavalry Barracks at Brighton c.1853-54, illustrated in Wilkinson-Latham, no.27 p. 35).

The oil painting by the Chevalier Louis Desanges may be a fair and genuine likeness. Between 1857 and 1862, Desanges painted 50 VC winners. Of those, some 23 were Crimean VC winners, but only four of those depicted in the series were rankers. Depicting acts of saving the lives of other soldiers is the common thread explaining why these individual VC winners were picked out for commemoration in the series of paintings, but Samuel Parkes is the only one of the entire 50 to illustrate a ranker saving another ranker, as opposed to a ranker saving an officer. The set of VC paintings were displayed at the Crystal Palace from 1862 to c.1880. They were then bought by Lord Wantage VC who presented them to the Wantage town council in 1900. Later, the collection was dispersed, many being bought by regimental museums. The portraits were widely reproduced as postcards and photographs. The Desanges portrait is reproduced in M. Barthorp, "Heroes of the Crimea. The Battles of Balaklava & Inkerman." (Blandford, London, 1991), p. 132 and in colour in Elkin, "Tamworth's Forgotten Hero.", p. 145.

Parkes also appears in the watercolour 'The Queen distributing the first Victoria Crosses in Hyde Park, 26 June 1857' by G H Thomas that is in the British royal collection. Not much of him can be seen at the very far left, but he is shown (correctly) wearing the newly introduced dragoon uniform. This painting is reproduced in Elkin, "Tamworth's Forgotten Hero.", p. 44.

VC winners were a popular subject for postcards and cigarette cards, but none showing Parkes is accurate, e.g. a John Player & Sons cigarette card from their 1914 series 'Victoria Cross' (card no.5) shows him winning his VC still mounted on his horse. The coloured Raphael Tuck oilette postcard (number 9247; artist = H. Montague Love, 1905) in their series 'How he won the Victoria Cross' is an even more fanciful depiction of Parkes, showing him dressed in the uniform of a hussar and saving a lancer. This card is reproduced in Elkin, "Tamworth's Forgotten Hero.", p. 143. At least Valentine's "Artotype" series 'The King's Army, 1854' (artist R. Stewart) showed the 4th at Balaklava dressed correctly as dragoons with the right regimental facings, even if the caption called them the 4th Hussars.
