= Wigginton and Hopwas =

- Civil parish
- Interactive map of Wigginton and Hopwas
- Coordinates: 52°39′N 1°43′W
- Country: England
- Primary council: Lichfield
- County: Staffordshire
- Region: West Midlands
- Status: Parish
- Main settlements: Wigginton, Hopwas, Comberford

Government
  - Type: Parish Council
  - UK Parliament: Tamworth

Population ((2011))
  - Total: 1,016

Wigginton and Hopwas is a civil parish in Lichfield District, Staffordshire, England. The villages of Wigginton and Hopwas, that make up the parish, lie 2 miles to the north and north-west, respectively, of Tamworth. They are separated by the River Tame, the Coventry Canal and the West Coast Main Line. The parish also includes the hamlet of Comberford.

The civil parish is based on the old ecclesiastical parish of Wigginton; Hopwas had been part of the parish of Tamworth. It contains several listed buildings, including churches at Wigginton and at Hopwas, farms and houses, and even a listed milepost in Hopwas.

== See also ==
- Listed buildings in Wigginton and Hopwas
