= Listed buildings in Wigginton and Hopwas =

Wigginton and Hopwas is a civil parish in the district of Lichfield, Staffordshire, England. The parish contains 16 listed buildings that are recorded in the National Heritage List for England. All the listed buildings are designated at Grade II, the lowest of the three grades, which is applied to "buildings of national importance and special interest". The parish contains the villages of Wigginton and Hopwas and the surrounding countryside. Most of the listed buildings are houses and farmhouses, and the other listed buildings include two churches, a former pumping station, a pump house, a war memorial and a milepost.

== Buildings ==
Name and location	Photograph	Date	Notes
Church House, Comberford; 52.66282°N 1.72019°W	—	15th century	The house was remodelled and extended in the 19th century. The original part is timber framed with brick infill, the rebuilding and extensions are in red brick, partly rendered, and the roof is tiled. The original part consists of a two-bay hall and a cross-wing, with later extensions. There are two storeys, and the windows are casements.
School House, School Lane; 52.64421°N 1.73670°W		1717	Originally a schoolmaster's house, it is in red brick with storey bands and a tile roof. There are two storeys and an attic, three bays, and single-storey extension on both ends. The doorway has a rectangular fanlight and a segmental head, and the windows are casements with segmental heads. In the centre at attic level is an inscribed slab.
Comberford Lodge Farmhouse, wall and railings 52.66466°N 1.71844°W	—	Early 18th century	The farmhouse was extended in 1801. It is in red brick, partly rendered, with side pilasters, and roofs in tile and slate. There are three storeys, three bays, flanking wings with rounded ends, and a rear wing. The central porch has two fluted Ionic columns, two fluted Doric pilasters, and a flat hood, and the doorway has a fanlight. The windows are casements, most with moulded surrounds. In front of the farmhouse is a semicircular garden enclosed by a low brick wall with rendered coping and railings.
Manor Farmhouse, Comberford; 52.66362°N 1.71919°W	—	Mid 18th century	A red brick farmhouse with a dentilled eaves band and a tile roof. There are two storeys and an attic, and three bays. The doorway has a bracketed hood, the windows are sashes with segmental heads, and there are dormers with hipped roofs.
1 Hints Road, Hopwas; 52.64250°N 1.73635°W	—	Late 18th century	A red brick house with a dentilled eaves band and a tile roof. There are two storeys, and a T-shaped plan with a front of three bays. The central doorway has pilasters, a fanlight and a pediment. Most of the windows are sashes, and in the left gable end is a round bay window with a hipped roof.
104 Main Road, Wigginton; 52.65633°N 1.69218°W	—	Late 18th century	A red brick house with a tile roof, hipped to the right. There are two storeys and an attic, and three bays. The doorway and the windows, which are casements, have segmental heads, and there are three hipped dormers.
Black and White Cottages, School Lane; 52.64383°N 1.73683°W		Late 18th century	A row of three timber framed cottages, with painted brick infill, some rebuilding in brick, and a tile roof. There is one storey and an attic, and three bays. On the front is a gabled porch, the windows are casements, one with a segmental head, and there are two dormers, one with a flat head and the other gabled.
Comberford Hall; 52.65546°N 1.71861°W	—	Late 18th century	A red brick house with hipped slate roofs. There are three storeys, four bays, and later rear extensions. On the front is a Tuscan porch, and the windows are sashes.
Arkall Farmhouse; 52.65424°N 1.67417°W	—	1777	The farmhouse is in red brick with an eaves band and a tile roof. There are three storeys and an L-shaped plan, consisting of a three-bay main range and a rear wing. On the front is a central porch with a hipped roof, and the windows are casements with segmental heads.
St Leonard's Church, Wigginton; 52.65850°N 1.69252°W		1777	The north aisle was added in 1830, and the chancel in 1861–62. The nave and aisle are in red brick, the chancel is in stone, and the roof is slated. The church consists of a nave, a west porch, a north aisle, a chancel, and a northeast vestry. At the west end is a square bell turret with a circular oculus on each side and a pyramidal roof. Above the porch is a Diocletian window, and the north aisle has a circular west window. Inside, are two massive Tuscan columns supporting the west turret.
Wigginton Fields Farmhouse; 52.66806°N 1.69111°W	—	Early 19th century	A rendered farmhouse with a tile roof. There are three storeys, and an L-shaped plan, consisting of a main range of three bays, and a two-bay rear wing. In the centre is a flat-roofed porch, the windows in the main range are sashes, and in the rear wing they are casements with segmental heads.
Former Hopwas Pumping Station; 52.64206°N 1.74738°W		1879	The pumping station was built for Tamworth Waterworks, and has been altered and divided for residential use. It is in red brick with sandstone dressings, and slate roofs with coped verges, and it has three parallel ranges. Facing the road is the gabled end of the engine house with two storeys, an attic and a basement. The basement has an arch supporting two flights of steps that lead up to a central doorway that has a bracketed pediment. In the upper floor is a Venetian window, and at the top is a modillion cornice and a pediment containing an oculus. The other two ranges have a single storey, coped moulded gables with ball finials, and round-arched windows. Along the front boundary is a red brick wall with a blind balustrade and containing brick piers.
St Chad's Church, Hopwas; 52.64332°N 1.74178°W		1881	The church, designed by John Douglas, is built in red brick, with timber framing in the upper parts, and a tile roof. It consists of a nave, a south porch, a chancel, and a central tower with a south vestry and a north organ chamber. The tower has two stages, a dormer to the south, and a shingled spirelet. The east window has five lights and Perpendicular tracery.
Hopwas War Memorial; 52.64334°N 1.74155°W		1919	The memorial is in the churchyard of St Chad's Church, and is immediately to the east of the church. It is in Peterhead granite, and consists of a Celtic cross about 12 feet (3.7 m) high. The cross has a tapering shaft with a shallow foot, on a tapering plinth, on a base of three steps. On the front of the head of the cross is interlace carving, and there are carved wreaths on the sides of the plinth. On the front of the shaft and on its foot are inscriptions, on the front of the plinth are the names of those lost in the First World War, and on the front of the top step of the base are those who were lost in the Second world War.
Milepost at NGR SK 19680650; 52.65652°N 1.71102°W		Early 20th century (probable)	The milepost is on the northeast side of the A513 road. It is in cast iron, and has a triangular plan and a sloping head. On the head is "WIGGINTON PARISH", and on the sides are the distances to Tamworth, Alrewas, and Burton upon Trent.
Early 20th-century Hopwas Pump House; 52.64211°N 1.74772°W		1925	The pump house was built for Tamworth Waterworks, it is in red brick with sandstone dressings, and has a slate roof with coped verges. There is one storey and a basement, and a one-bay gabled front facing the road. At the sides are giant rusticated pilasters, and steps lead up to a central round-headed doorway with a moulded architrave and a keystone with a cartouche. Above it is an inscribed panel, a decorative cornice, and a pediment with an oculus. Along the sides are four bays and round-headed windows.
