= Comberford =

Village in Staffordshire, England

Coordinates: 52.663°N 1.717°W

- Location within Staffordshire
- OS grid reference: SK192074
- Civil parish: Wigginton and Hopwas
- District: Lichfield
- Shire county: Staffordshire
- Region: West Midlands
- Country: England
- Sovereign state: United Kingdom
- Post town: TAMWORTH
- Postcode district: B79
- Dialling code: 01827
- Police: Staffordshire
- Fire: Staffordshire
- Ambulance: West Midlands
- UK Parliament: Tamworth

Comberford is a small settlement in Staffordshire, England. It lies by the River Tame, about 4 kilometres (2 mi) north-east of Tamworth along the A513 road. Historically part of the parish of Wigginton, it is now within the Wigginton and Hopwas civil parish in the district of Lichfield.

There is an Anglican church in the village, dedicated to St Mary and St George.
