= St Chad's Church, Hopwas =

Coordinates: 52.6433°N 1.7418°W

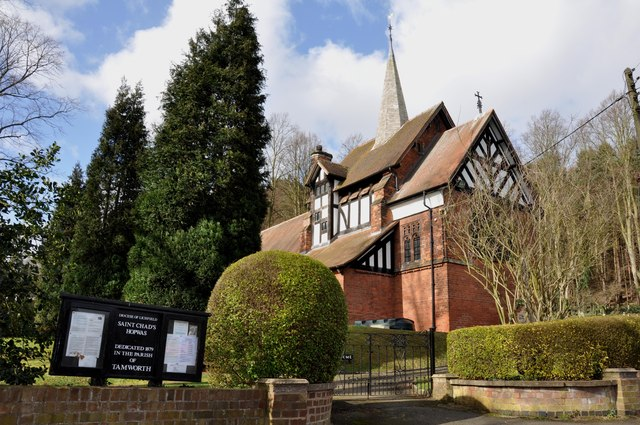
- St Chad's Church, Hopwas

- Location in Staffordshire
- OS grid reference: SK 175 050
- Location: Hopwas, Staffordshire
- Country: England
- Denomination: Anglican
- Website: Hopwas, St Chad

History
- Dedication: St Chad

Architecture
- Functional status: Active
- Heritage designation: Grade II
- Designated: 29 October 1987
- Architect: John Douglas
- Architectural type: Church
- Completed: 1881

Administration
- Province: York
- Diocese: Lichfield
- Archdeaconry: Lichfield
- Deanery: Tamworth
- Parish: Tamworth

St Chad's Church is in the village of Hopwas, Staffordshire, England. It is an active Anglican parish church in the deanery of Tamworth, the archdeaconry of Lichfield and the diocese of Lichfield. Its benefice is combined with those of St Editha, Tamworth, St Francis, Leyfields, and St Andrew, Kettlebrook. The church is recorded in the National Heritage List for England as a designated Grade II listed building.

== History and architecture ==
The church was designed by the Chester architect John Douglas and built in 1881. It is built in red brick with timber framing in its upper parts, and has a roof of plain tiles. The church is crowned by an octagonal flèche. Its plan consists of a five-bay nave and a single-bay chancel between which is the flèche, with a vestry to the south and an annex accommodating the organ to the north. Of its design the architectural historian Nikolaus Pevsner says it is "certainly an ingenious and entertaining building".

== Present day ==
The church holds regular services on Sundays and holds other events for adults and children during the week.

== See also ==
- List of new churches by John Douglas
- Listed buildings in Wigginton and Hopwas
