= Hopwas =

Village in Staffordshire, England

Coordinates: 52.642°N 1.739°W

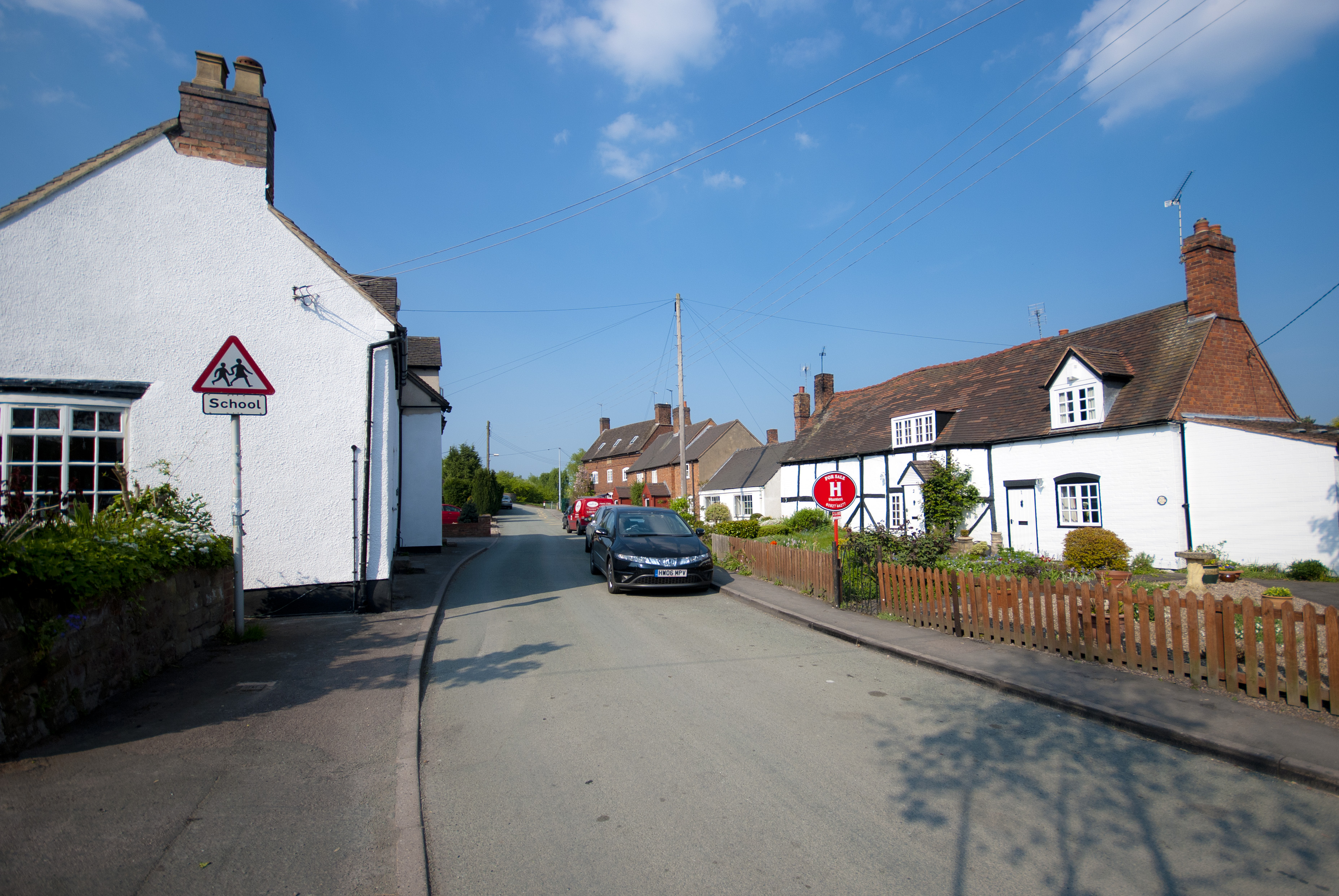
- School Lane in Hopwas

- Location within Staffordshire
- Population: 1,016 (2011)
- OS grid reference: SK175050
- Civil parish: Wigginton and Hopwas
- District: Lichfield
- Shire county: Staffordshire
- Region: West Midlands
- Country: England
- Sovereign state: United Kingdom
- Post town: TAMWORTH
- Postcode district: B78
- Dialling code: 01827
- Police: Staffordshire
- Fire: Staffordshire
- Ambulance: West Midlands
- UK Parliament: Tamworth

Hopwas is a village in Staffordshire, England. It lies along the North West borders of Tamworth Borough (along the River Tame to the east and Dunstall Lane to the south of Hopwas) and 5 miles (8 km) east of Lichfield. It is situated where the A51 road crosses both the River Tame and the Coventry Canal. Although adjacent to the Borough of Tamworth, the village is part of the parish of Wigginton and Hopwas within Lichfield District.

== History ==
Hopwas is recorded in the Domesday Book of 1086 as follows: "The King holds Opewas; there are three hides; the arable land is six carucates. In demesne there is a mill of thirteen shillings and four pence rent; and eleven villeins and two bordars employ five ploughs. Here are thirty acres of meadow, a wood six furlongs in length and three in breadth. The whole was valued aforetime and then at 40s."

== Amenities ==
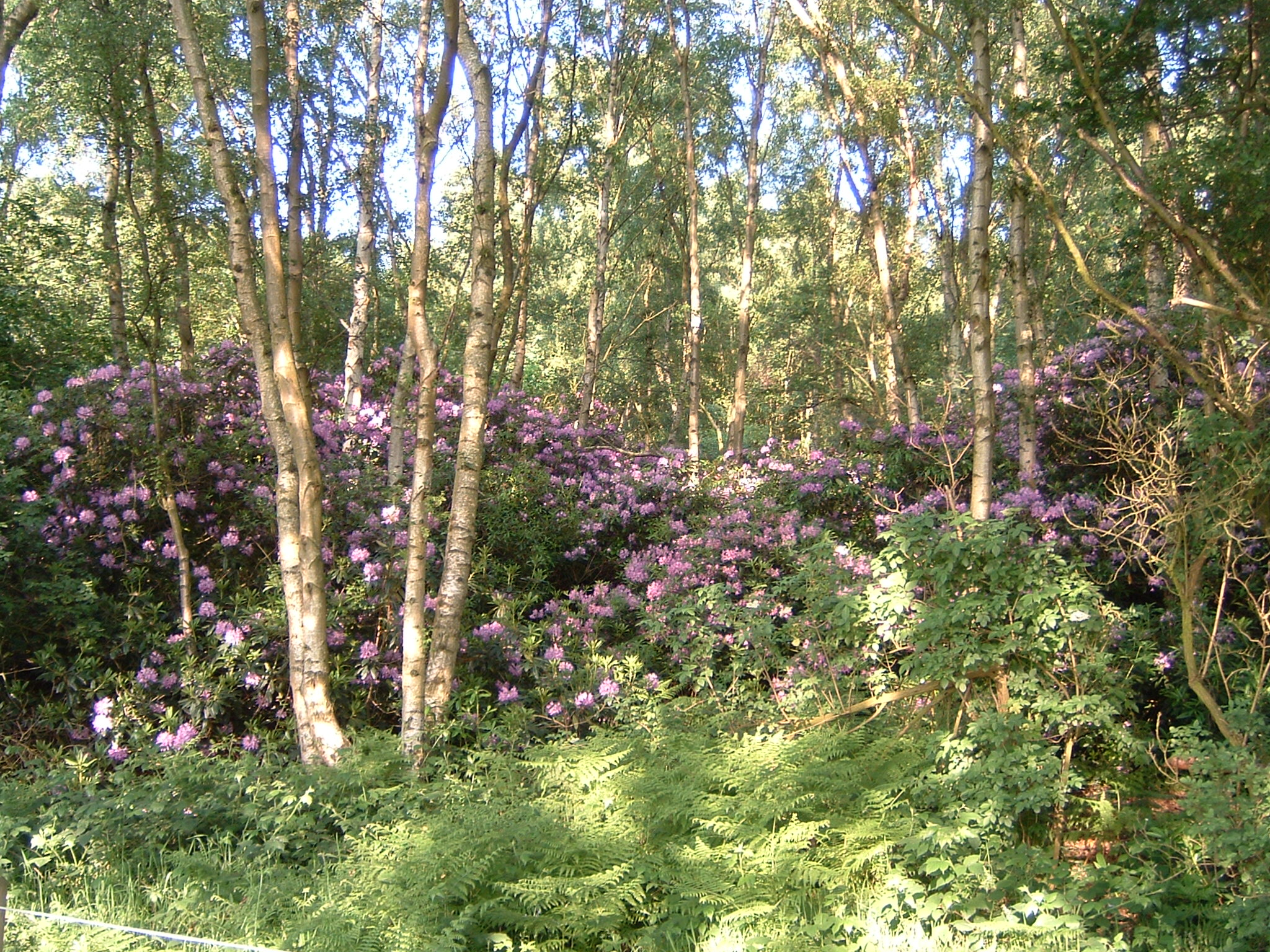
Hopwas Hays Wood

North of Hopwas village is Hopwas Hays Wood, which consists of approximately 385 acres of ancient woodland, that was owned for many years by the Levett family of Wychnor Park. A large part of the woodland is currently owned by Tarmac.

Tamworth Cricket and Hockey Club is based on Hints Road in Hopwas, where it also has a squash section.

The village has a variety of clubs and societies including an active women's institute and book club.

Hopwas is served by Arriva bus servies 765 and X65 connecting to Lichfield and Tamworth.

== Historic buildings ==
Hopwas has a number of listed buildings, including cottages, a school house and the Parish Church of St Chad. Of particular interest may be the canal bridge, a milepost, and the Hopwas Pumping Station.

Hopwas also possesses two historic public houses, the Red Lion and the Tame Otter (formerly the Chequers).

Lichfield transmitting station, also known as Hopwas Mast, is nearby.

== Notable people from Hopwas ==
- Guy Newman Smith (born 1939), writer

== See also ==
- Listed buildings in Wigginton and Hopwas
