= Church of St Editha, Tamworth =

Church in Staffordshire, England

Church of St Editha
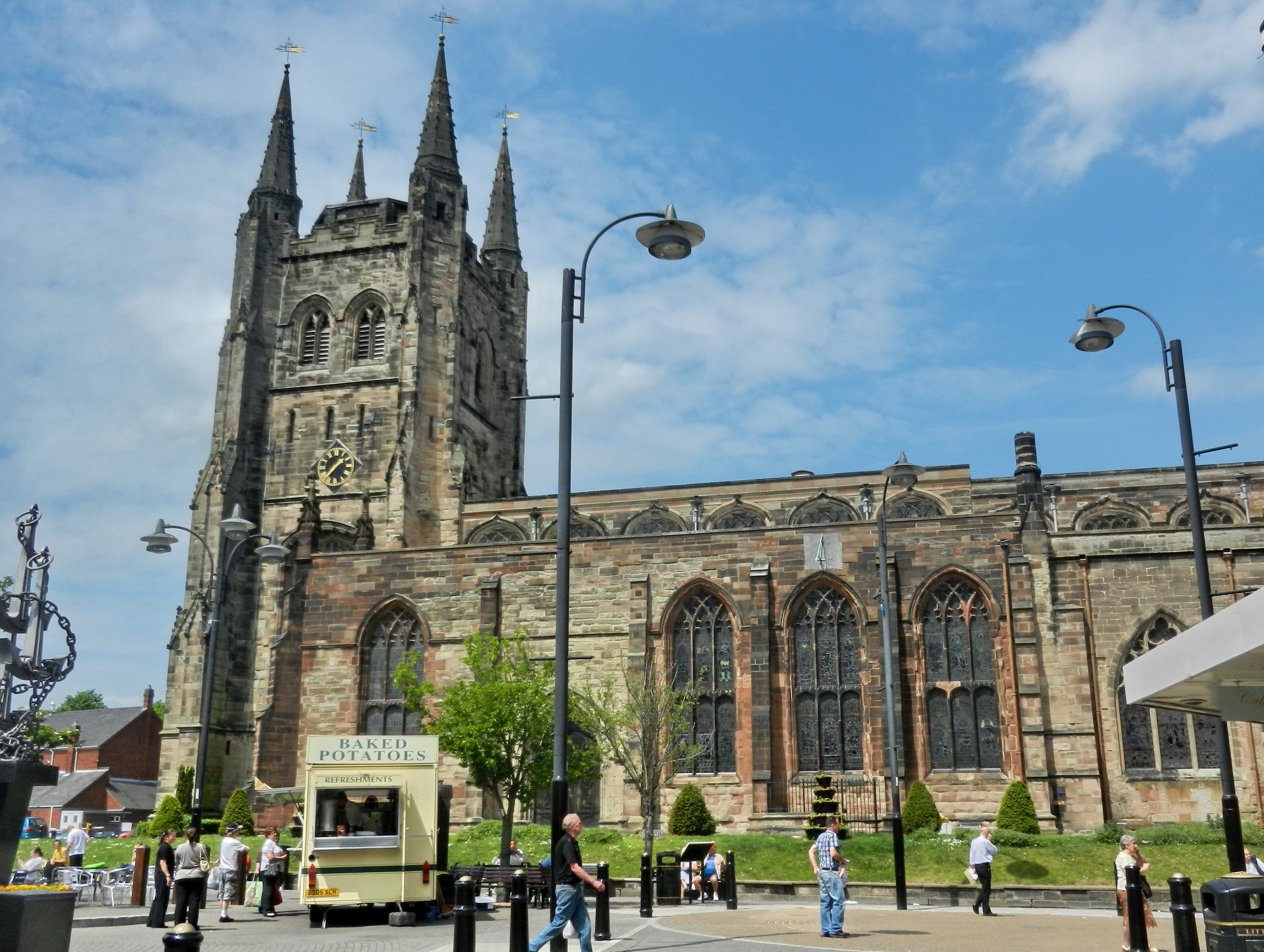
- St Editha's Church
- Church of St Editha
- 52.6342°N 1.6943°W
- Denomination: Church of England
- Website: https://www.stedithatamworth.co.uk

History
- Dedication: Saint Editha

Administration
- Province: Canterbury
- Diocese: Diocese of Lichfield

Clergy
- Vicar: Rev. Fr. Andrew Lythall

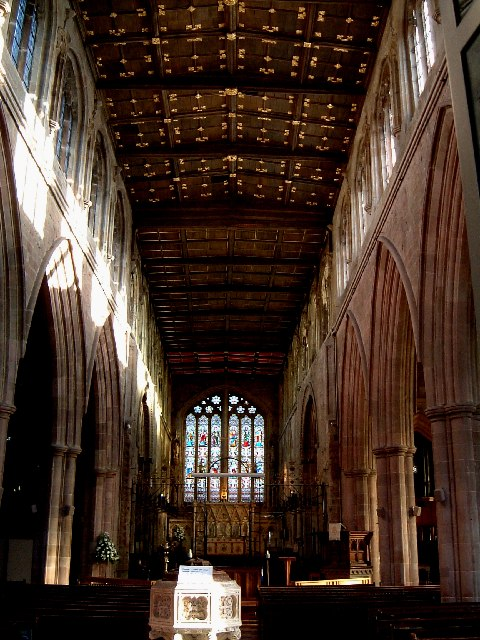
Interior of St Editha's Church

The Church of St Editha is a Church of England parish church and Grade I listed building in Tamworth, Staffordshire, England.

== History ==
The church of St Editha is the largest parish church in Staffordshire. Most of the church is mid- to late-14th-century and 15th-century work with some 19th-century additions.

The present building stands upon the ground where successive churches have stood since the 8th century. The first church was destroyed, along with the town, by the Danes in 874 and it was not until the time of Æthelflæd that a second church arose. The Danes ruined this church in 943 and it was King Edgar who re-founded it around 963. Editha was probably King Edgar's aunt who died in the 960s and was canonized shortly after for her life of devotion and piety and then made the patron saint of the now collegiate church.

In 1345 the town and church were destroyed by fire and so began a rebuilding, being the fourth (present) church. Begun in 1350 and completed in 1369, this edifice is a monument to the man whose task it became to rebuild and enlarge the church, Dean Baldwin de Witney.

The College of Canons of St Editha was probably a royal foundation in the 10th century, although the date of foundation is unknown. Although the right to appoint canons was disputed, by the 12th century, all appointments were royal. There were a dean and six prebendaries.

The college was dissolved in 1548 under the terms of the Dissolution of Colleges Act 1547 and the church became the parish church for the town of Tamworth.

Samuel Parkes (c.1815–1864) was baptised here on 24 December 1815. He won the Victoria Cross in the Charge of the Light Brigade for saving the life of Trumpeter Hugh Crawford. His parents Thomas Park(e)s and Lydia Fearn are buried in the churchyard and commemorated by a tombstone.

The church was extensively restored by Benjamin Ferrey and George Gilbert Scott in the 1850s, and William Butterfield, ca. 1871. There is a rare example of a double spiral staircase in the tower; others are at the Château de Chambord, France and All Saints' Church, Pontefract.

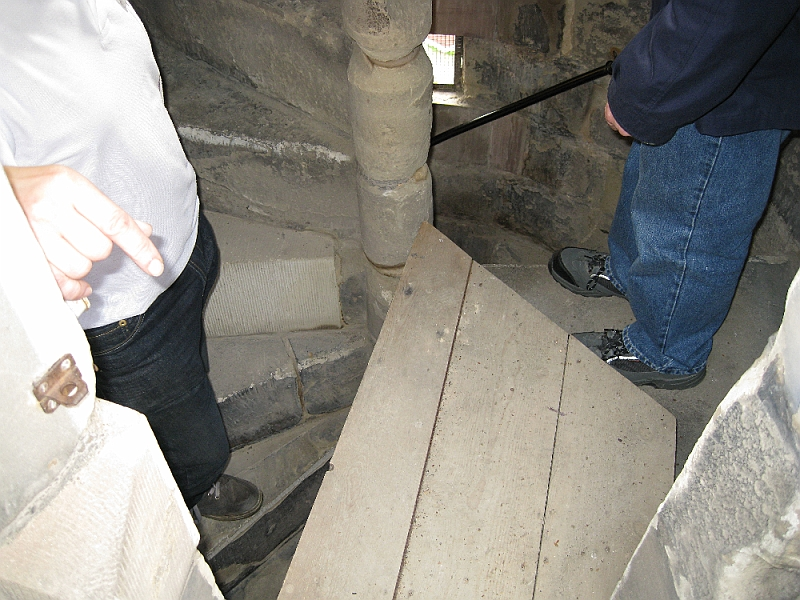
Top of double spiral staircase

Recent years have seen significant restoration and renewal at the church, following an ambitious program begun in 2022. Today, the church is an active community with a large congregation, undertaking significant work in the wider community. It serves a civic role for Tamworth and the wider Tamworth Deanery. St. Editha's stands within the modern catholic tradition of the Church of England.

=== Deans of Tamworth ===
- William Marmion ca 1240
- Matthew ca 1257
- Ralph de Manton
- John de Teford ca. 1291
- Roger le Wyne between 1292 and 1295 – 1305
- Walter de Bedewynde 1305 – 1310
- Hugh de Babynton 1310 – 1315
- Master Henry de Cliffe 1317 – 1319
- Nicholas Isambardi de Longavilla ca. 1320 – 1329
- Baldwin de Whitney 1329 – 1369
- Walter Pryde 1369 – 1372
- Reynold de Hulton 1372 – 1389
- Thomas Iberye 1389 – 1391
- John de Massyngham 1391 – 1399
- John Bernard 1400 – 1429
- Clement Denston 1429
- Thomas Rodborne 1429 – 1433
- John de la Bere 1433 – 1434
- William Newport 1434 – 1436
- John Bate 1436 – 1479
- Ralph Ferrers 1479 – 1504
- Thomas Bowd 1504 – 1508
- William Lichfield 1508 – 1512
- Humphrey Wistow 1512 – 1514
- William Hone 1514 – 1522
- Richard Rawson 1522 – 1525
- Thomas Parker 1525- 1538
- Simon Symonds 1538 – 1548

== Stained glass ==
There are medieval fragments in the vestry east window. The chancel east window dates from 1870, by William Wailes.

There are south clerestory windows of 1873, by Ford Madox Brown for Morris & Co. The chapel east window of 1874 is by Edward Burne-Jones also for Morris & Co.

== Organ ==
The church has an historic pipe organ dating from 1766. The first instrument was installed by Nathaniel Dudley. Samuel Green built a new organ in 1792, taking the Dudley organ to Isleworth in South West London. Alexander Buckingham added a chair/choir division in 1809 and a pedal division was added by William Hill in 1841. Further work was carried out by George Holdich, Brycesons Bros and finally Nicholsons of Worcester. A new organ was built in 1927 by Harrison and Harrison incorporating much of the old pipework. A comprehensive restoration took place in 2016/17. A specification from 1929 can be found on the National Pipe Organ Register.

=== Organists ===
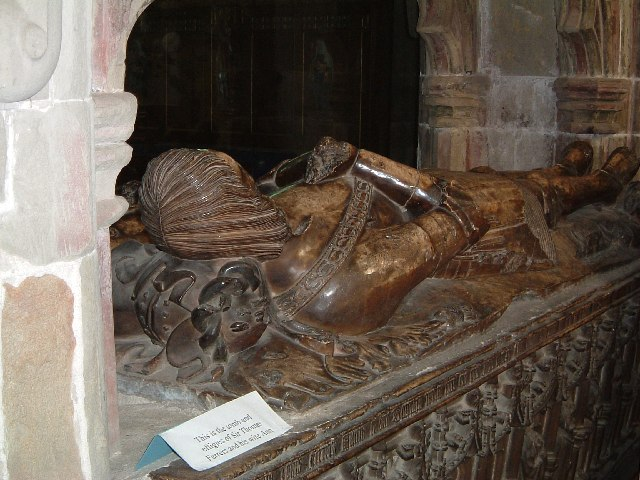
Tomb of Sir Thomas Ferrers and his wife Ann

- John Alcock 1766 – 1790
- William Birch 1790 – 1815
- John Valentine 1815 – 1816
- Thomas Valentine 1816 – 1818
- John Twelch Greaves 1818 – 1828
- John Hewitt 1828 – 1829
- James J. Greaves 1829 – 1832
- John Twelch Greaves 1832 – 1867
- T. H. Reade 1867 – 1868
- J. Smith Creswell 1868 – 1874
- George Herbert Gregory 1874 – 1876 (afterwards organist of St Botolph's Church, Boston)
- William Edward Wadely 1876 – 1877
- R. Matthews 1877 – 1886
- Henry Rose 1886 – 1950
- W. Darling 1950 – 1965
- W. H. Hughes 1965 – 1972
- Kenneth Edwards 1973 – 2025
- Janine Busbridge 2025 –

In 1929, Henry Rose appointed the then 13-year-old Ernest Titterton as assistant organist. Titterton later went on to help develop the atomic bomb.

The organ was recently complemented with the purchase of a Steinway Grand Piano, the only one in Tamworth.

== See also ==
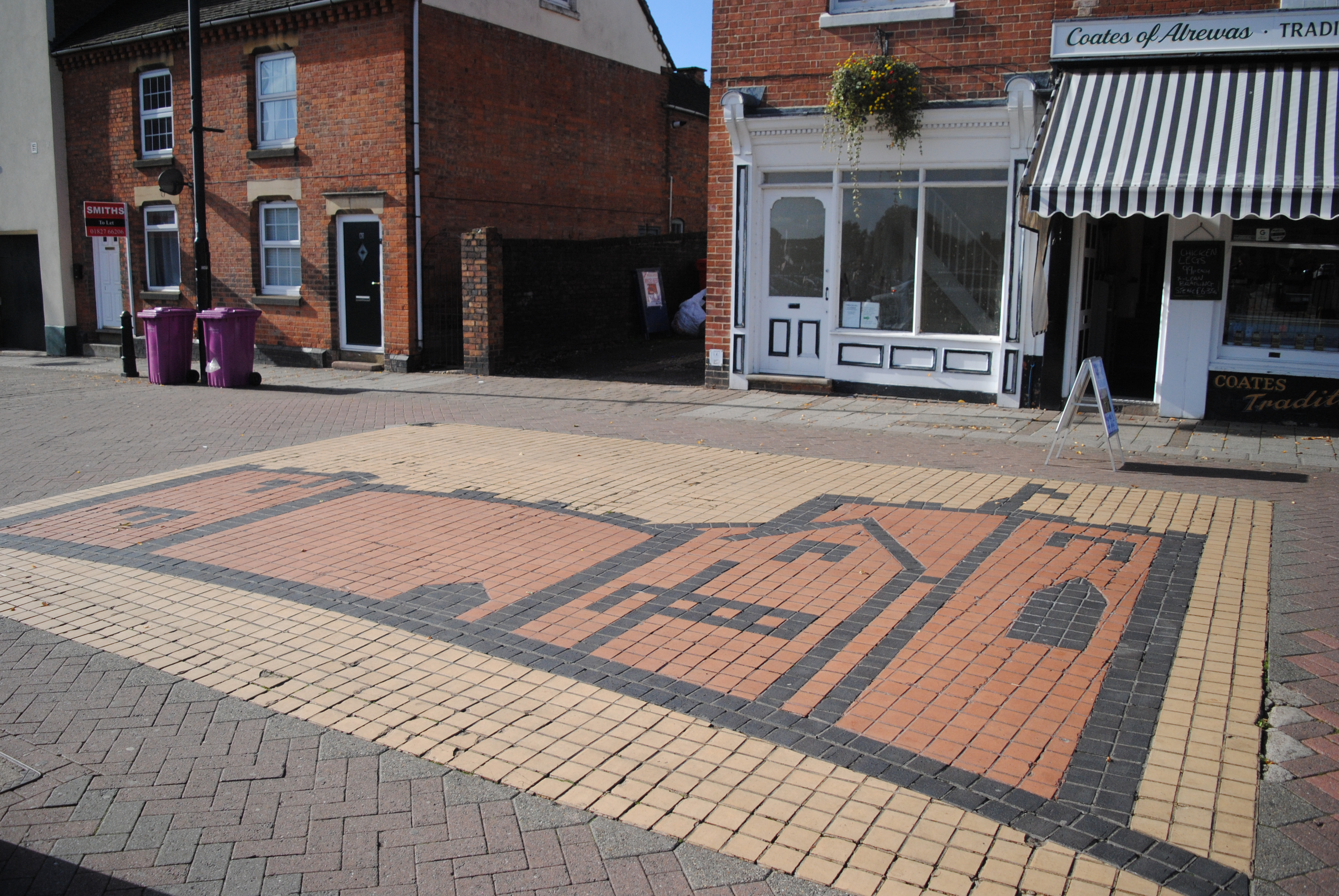
The church is depicted in this brick mural in the pavement of nearby Colehill

- Edith of Polesworth
- Dissolution of the Monasteries
- Grade I listed buildings in Staffordshire
- Grade I listed churches in Staffordshire
- Listed buildings in Tamworth, Staffordshire
