= Battle of Ghazni =

1839 battle of the First Anglo-Afghan War

- Part of the First Anglo-Afghan War
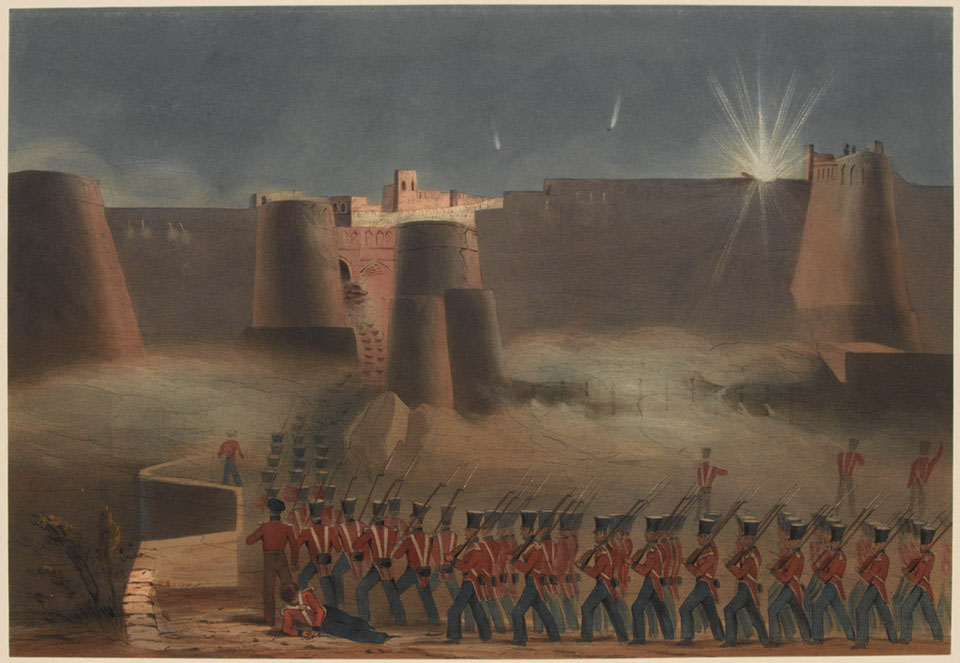
- British troops storming Ghazni during the battle
| Date | 23 July 1839 |
| Location | Ghazni, Afghanistan |
| Result | British victory |

Belligerents
| United Kingdom; East India Company | Emirate of Kabul |

Commanders and leaders
| Sir John Keane | Hyder Khan |

Strength
| 20,500 | 3,500 |

Casualties and losses
| 200 killed and wounded | 500 killed 1,600 captured |

The Battle of Ghazni (Note: also referred to as the Battle of Ghuznee) took place in the city of Ghazni in central Afghanistan on Tuesday, 23 July 1839, during the First Anglo-Afghan War.

== Prelude ==
In the 1830s, the British were firmly entrenched in India but by 1837, feared a Russian invasion through the Khyber and Bolan Passes as the Russian Empire had expanded towards the British dominion. The British sent an envoy to Kabul to form an alliance with Afghanistan's emir, Dost Muhammad against Russia. The Emir was in favour of an alliance but wanted British help in recapturing Peshawar which the Sikhs had captured in 1834. The British refused to help. Dost Muhammad then started negotiating with the Russians who had also sent an envoy to Kabul. This led the Governor General of India, Lord Auckland to conclude that Dost Muhammad was anti-British. British fears of a Russian invasion of India took one step closer to becoming a reality when negotiations between the Afghans and Russians broke down in 1838. This led to Persian troops, along with their Russian allies, attacking the city of Herat in western Afghanistan in an attempt to annex it. Russia, wanting to increase its presence in South and Central Asia, had formed an alliance with Persia, which had territorial disputes with Afghanistan as Herat had been part of the Persian empire and had only been taken over by Afghanistan in 1750. Lord Auckland's plan was to drive away the besiegers and install a ruler in Afghanistan who was pro-British. The British chose Shuja Shah Durrani to be the new leader of Afghanistan. He was the former ruler of Afghanistan and had formed a strategic alliance with Britain during the Napoleonic Wars against Russia and France, but had been deposed and was living in exile in Lahore.

== Invasion of Afghanistan ==
The British assembled two divisions from their Bengal Army commanded by Sir Harry Fane and another force of a single division from Bombay under the command of Sir John Keane. The Bombay force, numbering some 6,000 men, would sail by sea and land near the Indus river and then march into Afghanistan to join Fane's forces. The size of the invasion force was reduced from three divisions to two because there was no longer any prospect of confronting Persian and Russian forces. The second Bengal division which was originally supposed to take part in the invasion was now relegated as a reserve force and would remain in India. The quickest route to Kabul was to march across the Punjab and enter Afghanistan by way of Peshawar and the Khyber Pass, but Ranjit Singh, the ruler of Punjab would never consent to such a large force crossing the Punjab. The invasion route had to be through the southern passes, with the approach to Kabul via Kandahar and Ghazni; a journey three times the distance of the direct route. Therefore, after an assembly in a grand review at Ferozepore, Ranjit Singh, the Maharajah of the Punjab brought out the Dal Khalsa to march alongside the sepoy troops of the East India Company and the British troops in India. Following the agreement between Ranjit Singh and British viceroy Lord Auckland to restore Shah Shoja to the Afghan throne in Kabul, the British army marched towards Afghanistan from the south whereas Ranjit Singh's army marched through the Khyber Pass, which concluded with the participation in the victory parade in Kabul.

The Bengal Army, which now numbered some 8,500 men, would march inland towards Quetta after assembling in Ferozpur. In Quetta, it would link up with the Bombay Army and then invade Afghanistan. The Bengal Army would also be accompanied by 6,000 men led by Shuja Shah Durrani. The men under Durrani's command were Afghan exiles who believed that he was the rightful ruler of Afghanistan. The total size of the invasion force now numbered some 20,500 men. Sir Harry Fane refused to take part in the invasion because the Russians and Persians had abandoned the siege of Herat and the pretext for the invasion of Afghanistan was no longer there, and so the command of the invasion force passed to Sir John Keane.

The Bombay Army landed near the Indus river in December 1838 and continued to march until it met with the Bengal Army in Quetta. The Invasion force was short on supplies due to taking the longer southern route into Afghanistan, and also because many British supply convoys were lost to harassing attacks by tribesman in Baluchistan.

Many soldiers were starving and there was only enough water for the men, which caused many horses to die. However, Sir John Keane pressed on with the advance into Afghanistan through the Bolan and Kojuk passes. His forces marched 147 miles into Afghanistan and reached Kandahar on 4 May 1839. The local city leaders escaped to Western Afghanistan and the city was captured without the British firing a shot. The army's next objective was the fortress city of Ghazni as it commanded the trade routes and roads leading into Kabul. Before a final advance towards Kabul could be made, Ghazni had to be captured.

== Battle for the city ==
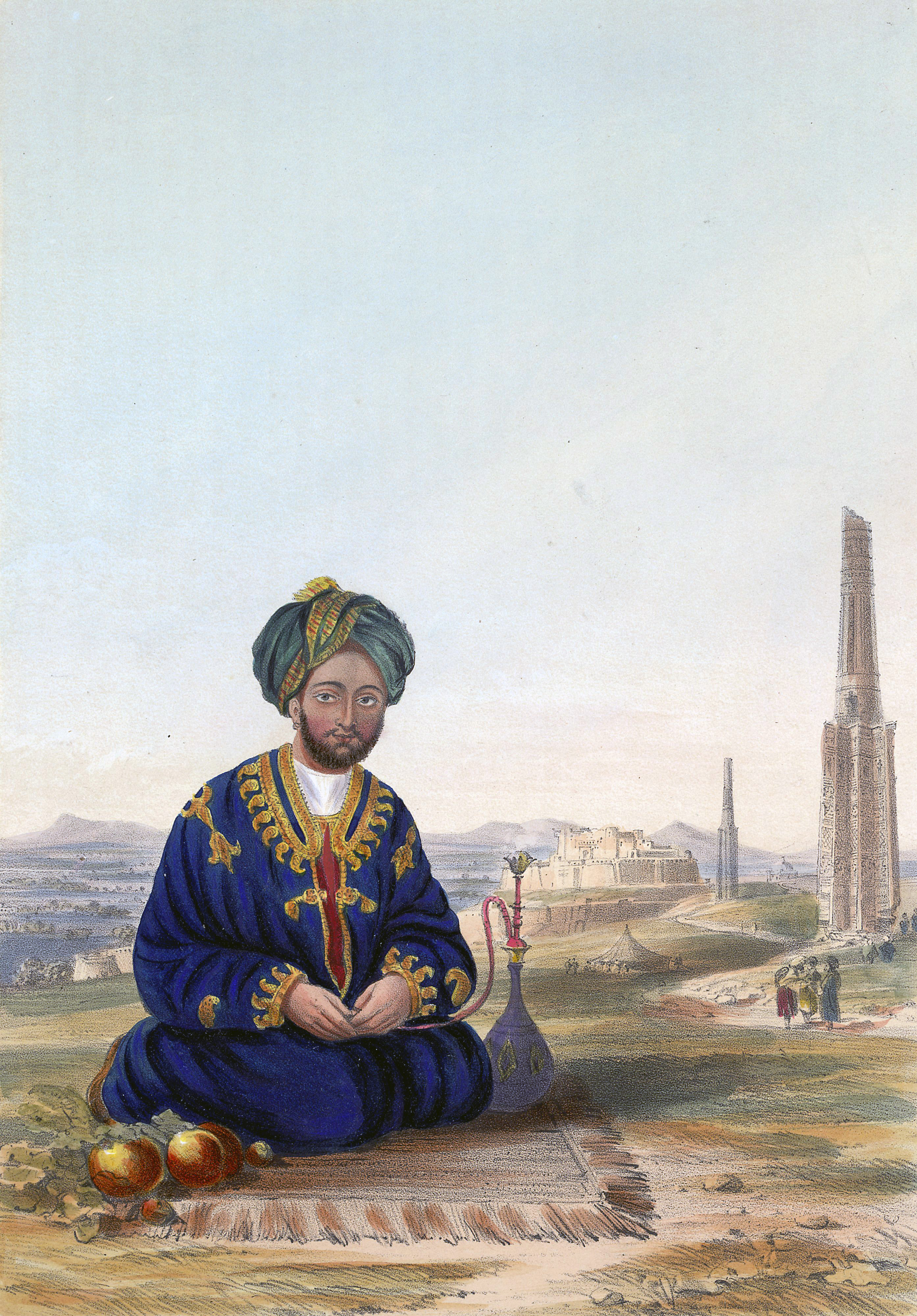
Ghulam Hyder Khan of Ghazni.

The severe shortages of supplies along with the lack of draft horses had led to heavy siege equipment being left in Kandahar. The army arrived at Ghazni on 21 July 1839. Initial reconnaissance showed the city to be heavily fortified with a 70-foot wall and a flooded moat. The defense of the city was led by Hyder Khan, the son of Dost Muhammad. Lacking siege equipment meant that the only way for the British to capture the city was through a frontal attack which would result in heavy casualties.

However, captured Afghan soldiers were interrogated by the British chief engineer, Colonel Thompson, to whom they revealed that all of the gates into Ghazni had been sealed with rocks and debris except the Kabul Gate which was in the north. Thompson spied on the gate and observed an Afghan courier entering the city which confirmed what the prisoners had said. Further inspection showed the gate to be lightly guarded and inadequately defended. It was then decided to attack the city through the Kabul gate. The British went around the city and camped on the north side facing the Kabul gate.

While the British forces had encircled the city, Shuja Shah Durrani and his forces had set up camp a few miles from the city to prevent any Afghan forces trying to relieve it. On 22 July 1839, thousands of Ghilji tribesmen attacked Shuja Shah Durrani's contingent but were repelled. With the Afghan relief forces driven away, the British were ready to mount an attack to capture the city.

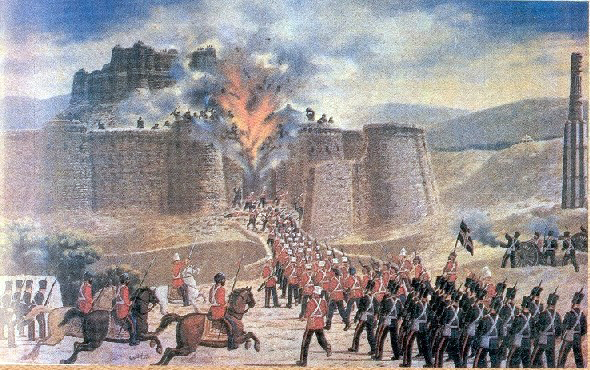
A British-Indian force attacks the Ghazni fort during the First Afghan War, 1839

British artillery was positioned to give covering fire to the advancing troops, and four British regiments were formed into a storming party commanded by Lieutenant Colonel Dennie. The rest of the three British regiments formed the main attacking column commanded by Brigadier Sale. High winds prevented the garrison from realising that they were about to be attacked.

At 3am on 23 July 1839, Indian engineers of the Bengal and Bombay Sappers and Miners moved towards the gate. As the engineers approached they were fired upon by the Afghans inside the city. The British artillery bombarded the city and gave cover to the engineers as they reached the gate. Gunpowder was piled beside the door, and the subsequent explosion destroyed the gate. The signal was given to attack and the four regiments led by Lieutenant Colonel Dennie rushed through the shattered gate. Bitter hand-to-hand fighting ensued in the darkness. The Afghan defenders launched a counterattack which cut off the storming party from the supporting columns. Brigadier Sale's forces fought their way through the gate to link up with Dennie's encircled men, but Sale was severely wounded. The British then fought their way into the centre of the city and by dawn the city was captured. The British forces suffered 200 men killed and wounded while the Afghans lost nearly 500 men and 1,600 taken prisoner, with an unknown number wounded.

== Aftermath ==
General Keane was, for his service, elevated to the Peerage as Baron Keane of Ghazni. He left a small garrison in Ghazni and began to march his forces towards Kabul on 30 July 1839. When the Afghan ruler, Dost Muhammad, heard about the fall of Ghazni, he asked for terms of surrender but the British offer was exile in India, which was unacceptable to him. He fled Kabul towards Western Afghanistan and the Afghan army surrendered. The British installed their puppet, Shuja Shah Durrani, as the new ruler of Afghanistan.

The Indian Engineers won many awards, with Capt A.C. Peat of the Bombay Sappers winning a Brevet-majority and a C.B. Thirteen N.C.O.s and sappers of the Bengal Sappers and six of the Bombay Sappers were awarded the newly instituted Indian Order of Merit, (Third Class), in effect becoming the first recipients of a formal gallantry award to soldiers of the native Indian Army under British rule. However, two officers, Lt H.M. Durand and Macleod, who had played critical roles in the assault, were not recognised by the government of India. The Ghuznee Medal, a British campaign medal, was awarded to all ranks of the British Army who participated in the storming of the fortress.

Ghazni is still feted as a major feat of arms by both groups of Engineers, which still exist today. The Bombay Sappers celebrate Ghazni Day each year on 25 February while the Bengal Sappers incorporated the Tower of Ghazni in their War Memorial constructed at Roorkee from 1911 to 1913. Bengal Sapper Subedar Devi Singh was the first recipient of the Indian Order of Merit.

== Battle Honour 'Ghuznee 1839' ==
=== Indian troops ===
A battle honour of 'Ghuznee 1839' was instituted by the Governor General in India vide Gazette of the Governor General dated 19 November 1839 and date added vide Gazette of India No 875 of 1907. The battle honour is not considered to be repugnant. The honour was awarded to all native Indian units which were employed in the reduction of the fortress:

- 4th Bengal Irregular Cavalry (1 Horse today).
- Poona Auxiliary Horse (Poona Horse).
- Bombay Sappers & Miners.
- 19th Bombay Infantry (2 Jat today).
- 1st Bombay Cavalry (13th Duke of Connaught's Own Lancers today of (Pakistan).
- 2nd, 3rd Bengal Cavalry (Mutinied in 1857).
- 2nd and 3rd Companies Bengal Sappers and Miners (Mutinied in 1857).
- 2nd, 16th, 35th, 38th and 48th Bengal Infantry (Mutinied in 1857).

=== European troops ===
The battle honour "Ghuznee" was awarded in 1839 by the Honourable East India Company to the 1st Bengal European Regiment. This was altered in 1844 to "Ghuznee, 1839" to differentiate it from an honour granted for a further engagement in 1842. The regiment later joined the British Army to become the 101st Regiment of Foot (Royal Bengal Fusiliers) and in 1881 the 1st Battalion of the Royal Munster Fusiliers. The latter regiment was disbanded in 1922.

=== British Army ===
In 1840 the battle honour "Ghuznee" (altered to "Ghuznee, 1839" in 1844) was awarded to the following units of the British Army:

- 4th (The Queen's Own) Regiment of Light Dragoons (now part of the Queen's Royal Hussars)
- 16th (The Queen's) Regiment of (Light) Dragoons (Lancers) (now part of the Queen's Royal Lancers)
- 2nd (Queen's Royal) Regiment of Foot (now part of the Princess of Wales's Royal Regiment
- 13th (1st Somersetshire) Regiment (Light Infantry) (now part of The Rifles)
- 17th (Leicestershire) Regiment of Foot (now part of the Royal Anglian Regiment)

== British Order of Battle ==
=== British Forces ===
- 4th (The Queen's Own) Regiment of (Light) Dragoons
- 16th (The Queen's) Regiment of (Light) Dragoons (Lancers)
- 2nd (The Queen's Royal) Regiment of Foot
- 13th (1st Somersetshire) Regiment (Light Infantry)
- 17th (The Leicestershire) Regiment of Foot

=== Native Indian Forces ===
- 2nd Bengal Light Cavalry
- 3rd Bengal Light Cavalry
- 3rd Skinner's Horse
- 31st Lancers
- 34th Poona Horse
- Shah Shujah's Regiment
- 1st Bengal Fusiliers (European Regiment) later the Munster Fusiliers
- 16th Bengal Native Infantry
- 48th Bengal Native Infantry
- 31st Bengal Native Infantry
- 42nd Bengal Native Infantry
- 43rd Bengal Native Infantry
- 2nd Bengal Native Infantry
- 27th Bengal Native Infantry
- 19th Bombay Infantry later the 119th Multan Regiment

=== Indian Sappers and Miners ===
- 2nd Company, Bengal Sappers and Miners
- 3rd Company, Bengal Sappers and Miners
- 1st Company, Bombay Sappers and Miners
