= Battle of Jalalabad (1842) =

1842 siege in the First Anglo-Afghan War

Coordinates: 34°25′49″N 70°27′10″E

- Part of the First Anglo-Afghan War
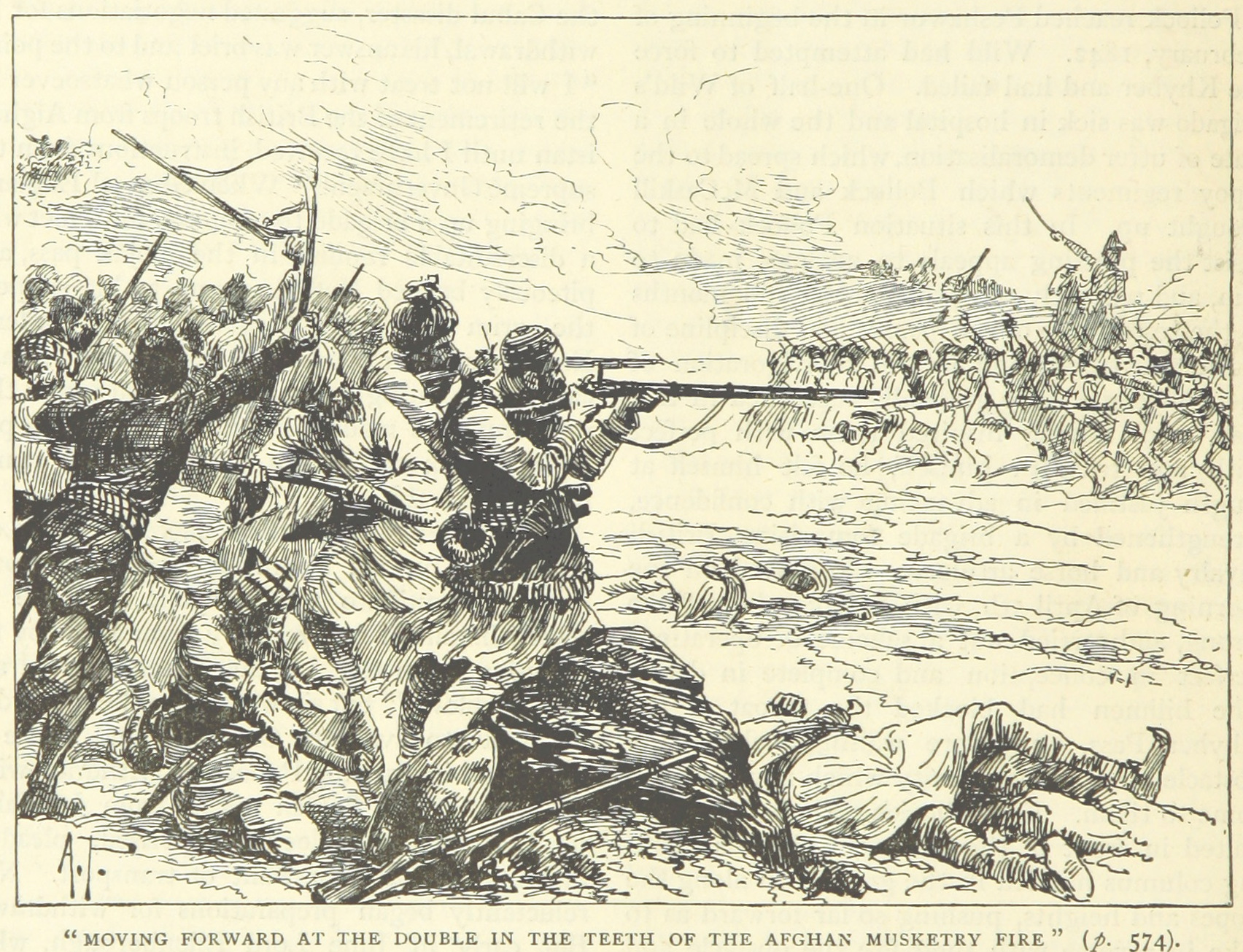
- The British troops (right) attack the Afghan line (illustration from a British book)
Date	12 November 1841 – 7 April 1842
Location	Jalalabad
Result	British Victory

Belligerents
(United Kingdom) British Empire; East India Company	Emirate of Kabul

Commanders and leaders
(United Kingdom) Sir Robert Sale (United Kingdom) William Dennie †	Mohammad Akbar Khan

Strength
5,000	Unknown

The Battle of Jalalabad, also known as the Siege of Jalalabad in 1842 was an Afghan siege of the isolated British outpost at Jalalabad, about 90 miles (140 km) east of Kabul during the First Anglo-Afghan War.

== Battle ==
The outpost was no more than a wide place in the road with a fort, held by about 5,000 troops under General Sir Robert Sale. After the massacre of the British force during their retreat from Kabul in January 1842, Jalalabad was surrounded by Afghan forces led by Wazir Akbar Khan. The English sent Wazir Akbar Khan a message:

"You have achieved a great victory by your courage and manliness. You have emerged triumphant on every field of battle and captured the English flag on which the image of Queen Victoria is depicted. If you have the heart of a lion and the claws of a leopard, plant that standard on the battlefield so that the figure of the queen will be in the view of the men of the English army and they will be encouraged to fight. At the moment of battle | you will see European men of honor and repute. Then it will become clear to you who is really courageous and what constitutes real manliness.".

Wazir Akbar Khan, who had always desired a fight on open ground, planted the British flag on a sandy hill west of the city to encourage the patriotism of the Europeans. The two sides formed battle formations and after a long battle the English were eventually defeated and retreated to Jalalabad.

After a failed assassination attempt by Akbar Khan's Kakar pishkhidmat Payindah khan, general George Pollock set for Jalalabad with 20,000 regulars. At the news of his arrival, Generals Sale and Macgregor were encouraged. They tunneled under the northern and southern gates of the city and attacked Muhammad Akbar Khans entrenchments, which were subsequently defeated. Wazir Akbar Khan returned to Lamqan where the British women and children were being held, and then on to Tizin to organize another army.

The following day George Pollock's Army of Retribution arrived, to be played into Jellalabad by the band of the 13th with the Scottish song "Oh but you've been a lang time acoming."

== Aftermath ==
The defence of Jalalabad made heroes of the 13th Foot (later known as the Somerset Light Infantry). It is reported that as the regiment marched back through India to return to Britain, every garrison fired a ten gun salute in its honour. Queen Victoria directed that the regiment be made Light Infantry, carry the additional title of "Prince Albert's Own" and wear a badge depicting the walls of the town with the word "Jellalabad". The army barracks in Taunton, the county town of Somerset, was named Jellalabad Barracks after the battle and that area of the town is still known as 'Jellalabad'.

W. L. Walton a landscape artist, working in London, who exhibited between 1834 and 1855, made the lithographic plates for General Sale's Defence of Jalalabad (c. 1845).

== Order of battle ==
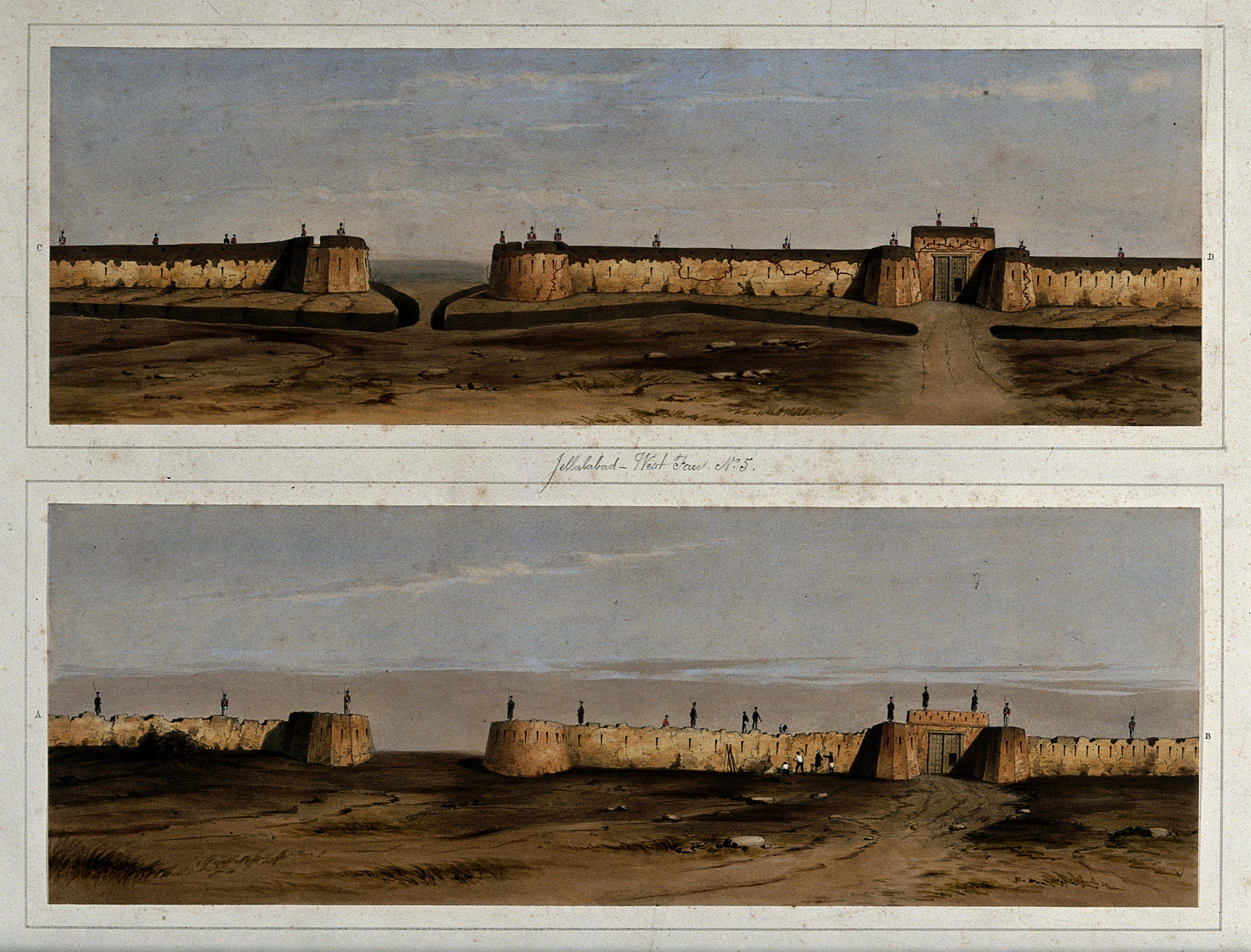
Jellallabad fortifications

The British order of battle was;

British Army

- 13th (1st Somersetshire, Prince Albert's Light Infantry) Regiment of Foot

Bengal Presidency Army

- Squadron from 1st Horse (Skinner's Horse)
- 35th Bengal Native Infantry
- Shah Shujah's Sappers
- Artillery troops from the Bengal Field Artillery

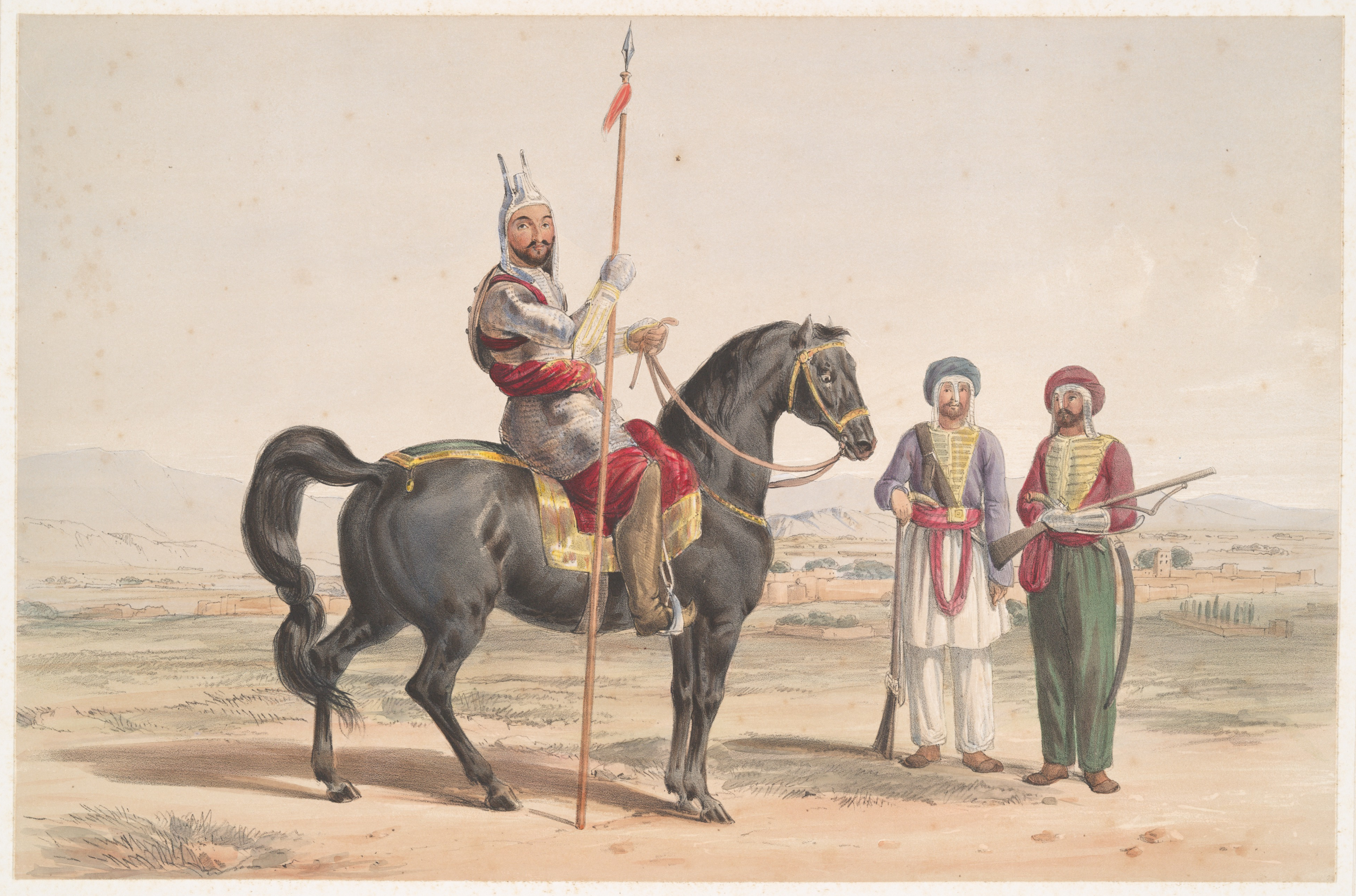
Sirdar Mahomed Ukbar Khan, in Jellalabād, as sketched by James Atkinson

== Notes ==
- The Free Dictionary by Farlex
