= John Dartnell =

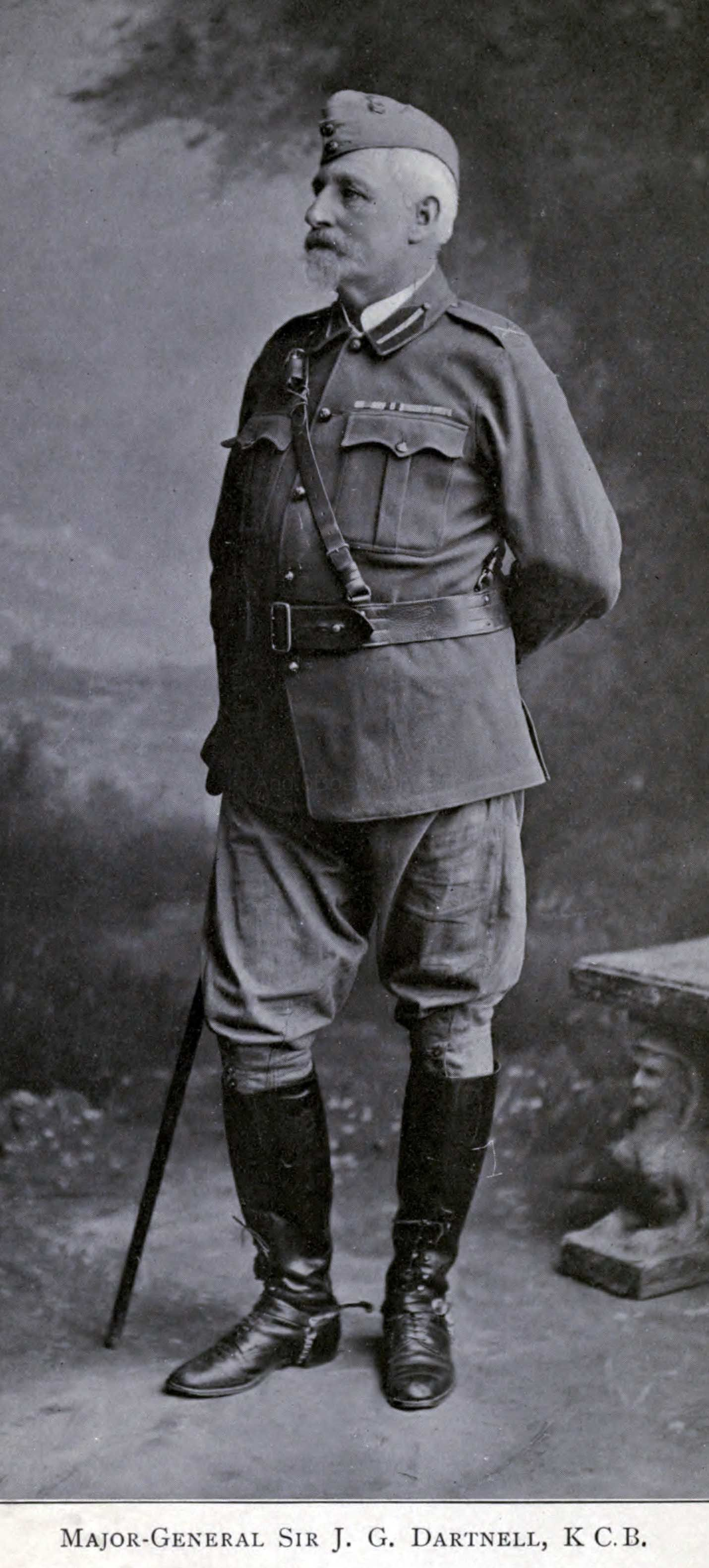
Major-General Sir J. G. Dartnell, KCB, CMG

Major-general Sir John George Dartnell KCB, CMG (2 April 1838 – 7 August 1913) was a British soldier and police officer who was the founder and first commandant of the Natal Mounted Police. A veteran of the Indian Mutiny, he saw action in every campaign in South Africa from 1879 including the Zulu War and the First and Second Boer Wars.

== Early life ==
'Hell Fire Jack' Dartnell was born in Ontario, Canada, in 1838, one of seven children of Anna Maria née Bennett (1813–1894) and George Russell Dartnell (1800–1878), a Limerick-born Staff Surgeon in the British Army. By 1851 the family were living in Rochester in Kent.

== Indian Mutiny 1857–59 ==
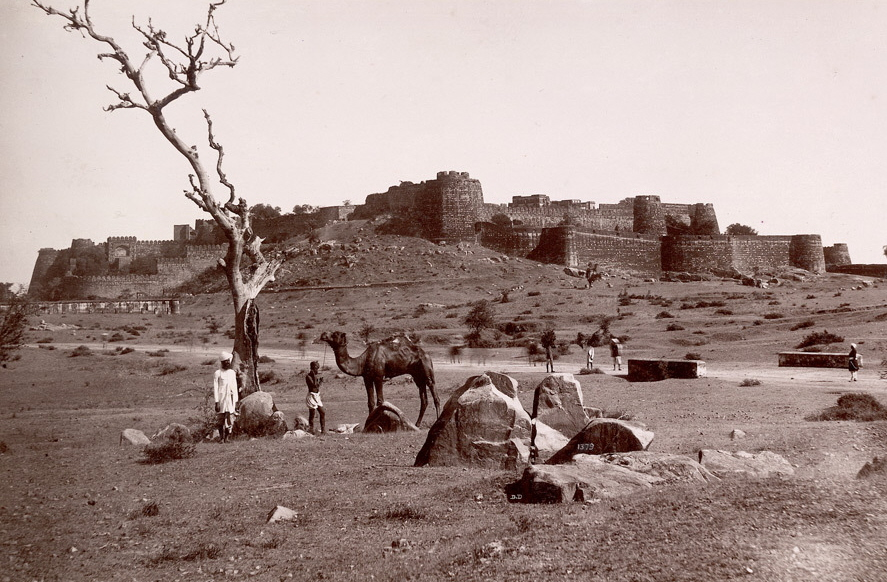
Dartnell was severely wounded during the storming of Jhansi Fort in 1858

Dartnell joined the 86th (Royal County Down) Regiment of Foot as an ensign in 1855 and was promoted to lieutenant in 1856. During the Indian Mutiny (1857–59) he served with his regiment during the storming of Chanderi in March 1858 and at the storming of Jhansi Fort on 3 April 1858 when he was disabled by wounds received while climbing the ladders to scale the fort's wall. The first man to ascend the ladder, Dartnell was set upon by the mutineers who slashed him with their sabres and shot him. He was recommended for the Victoria Cross but was not awarded it. For his gallantry he was promoted to company commander and was invalided to Britain to recover from his wounds. He was promoted to captain in 1859 and transferred to the 16th (Bedfordshire) Regiment of Foot.

Dartnell exchanged from the 16th to the 27th (Inniskilling) Regiment of Foot in 1862 with which he took part in the Bhutan War (1865) and as the aide-de-camp to Major General Sir Henry Tombs was present at the capture of Dewangiri. For his military service in India he was awarded the Indian Mutiny Medal with bar Central India.

== Move to Natal ==
In 1865 in India he married Clara Alicia née Steer (1843–1931) and with her had six children: Alice Gertrude Dartnell (1867–1928); Georgina Jane Dartnell (1871–1940); Isabel Mary Dartnell (1872–1957); Lilian Clara Dartnell (1874–1876); George Bruce Dartnell (1876–1936); and Helen Seymore Dartnell (1883–1885). He retired from the Army in 1869 by sale of his commission and he and his family moved to Natal in South Africa where his younger children were born. Here he became a farmer but with his wife soon tiring of the solitary life she urged him to find something else to do to earn a living.

== Natal Mounted Police ==
When in 1874 the Governor of Natal decided to raise a mounted police force following a rebellion by Chief Langalibalele Dartnell decided to apply for the position, despite having absolutely no experience of police work. However, as an experienced army officer he was offered and accepted the position of commandant. Promoted to major and wanting to learn how to organise and lead a police force, Dartnell went to Cape Colony to study the Frontier Armed and Mounted Police. On his return to Natal he set about raising the Natal Mounted Police. Originally he intended to recruit men from Great Britain but he was ordered to recruit local men, with the first enrolled being trooper Edward Babington of Londonderry in 1874. Dartnell would later claim his recruits were the:

...flotsam and jetsam of the colony, and a very rough lot they proved to be, being principally old soldiers and sailors, transport riders, and social failures from home, etc. They were, however, a very fine, hardy lot of men, ready to go anywhere and do anything, and very willing and cheerful if a little troublesome in town; but in the country, away from temptation, they were excellent men who grumbled occasionally, of course, but were more inclined to laugh at and make like of discomfort and hardship.

== Zulu War 1879 ==
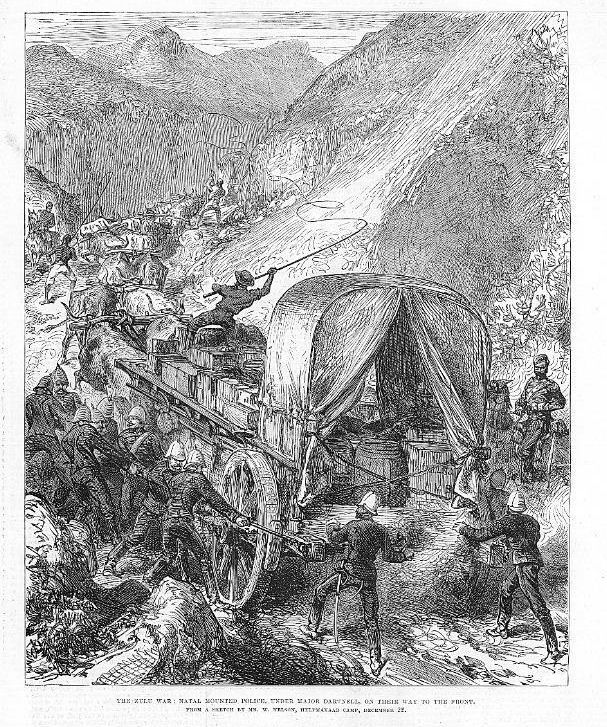
The Natal Mounted Police make their way to the front under darkness – The Illustrated London News (1879)

In 1879 during the Zulu War the Natal Mounted Police were attached to the British Army in the Central Column under the command of Lord Chelmsford. The NMP formed part of the mounted column under the newly-appointed command of captain (acting major) Russell of the 12th Lancers, while Dartnell was transferred to Chelmsford's Staff. The men of the NMP were unhappy at the prospect of not being commanded in the field by their old chief and refused to cross the border into the Zululand unless he was reinstated, at the same time threatening to resign. However, while no doubt moved by this display of his men's affection Dartnell was a soldier of the old school and after a ‘strong remonstrance’ with his men he persuaded them to serve under Major Russell.

Once in Zululand early on the morning of 21 January 1879 one detachment of 97 men of the NMP led by Dartnell was sent by Chelmsford to find the location of the Zulu army of Cetshwayo kaMpande. Riding in the direction of Hlazakazi Hill, about 10 miles from Isandlwana, Dartnell and his force had several encounters with Zulu warriors before he encountered a large Zulu force that he did not have the men to engage in a fight, so decided to monitor their movements from a safe distance. He sent two troopers back to Isandlwana to report to Lord Chelmsford regarding what he had seen and let him know that he and his men would spend the night at Hlazakazi Hill in order to continue to watch the Zulus. Chelmsford sent a man back to Dartnell stating he could engage with the enemy ‘if and when he thought fit’. However, by the time Dartnell received this message the situation had changed and the Zulu force had grown to several thousand warriors. Late in the evening of 21 January Dartnell sent another messenger to Chelmsford at Isandlwana reporting this large force of Zulus and requesting that Chelmsford send men to aid the Natal Mounted Police. Receiving the message at 1.30 am on the morning of 22 January Chelmsford came to the conclusion that Dartnell had located the main Zulu force and at dawn he led a large force consisting of the 2nd Battalion the 24th Regiment of Foot, the Mounted Infantry and four artillery guns. When Chelmsford reached Dartnell he found the Zulus had gone and immediately began a search of the surrounding hills. However, the Zulus had simply bypassed the British force and were heading for Isandlwana.

The second detachment of 34 men of the Natal Mounted Police Dartnell had left behind fought in the Battle of Isandlwana on 22 January 1879. Of this second detachment 25 were killed in the battle with 21 killed fighting alongside 19 Natal Carbineers in a 'last stand' defending Lieutenant-colonel Anthony Durnford. Three men of the NMP escaped from Isandlwana and made their way to Rorke's Drift where they fought in the Battle of Rorke's Drift, where one of them, Sidney Hunter, was killed in action. The first detachment of the NMP under Dartnell returned to Isandlwana on the evening of the battle where they spent the night among the ruins of the camp and the bodies of their colleagues before accompanying Lord Chelmsford's relief column on its advance to Rorke's Drift early the next morning.

== Rebellions ==
Under Dartnell the Natal Mounted Police served in the Basuto Gun War (1880–81), where they defended the passes of the Drakensberg against attack from the Basuto, and the Transvaal Rebellion (also known as the First Anglo-Boer War) (1880–81) when the NMP was used to form a mounted military force on the border with the Transvaal. When after these Rebellions normal policing duties were resumed men of the NMP provided an escort for the Empress Eugénie in 1880 when she came to Natal to see where her son, Napoléon the Prince Imperial, had been killed the previous year during the Zulu War.

Dartnell was in command of the Volunteer Forces in Natal and was promoted to colonel in 1885. He was appointed a member of the Defence Committee in 1887.

== Chief Commissioner of the Natal Police ==
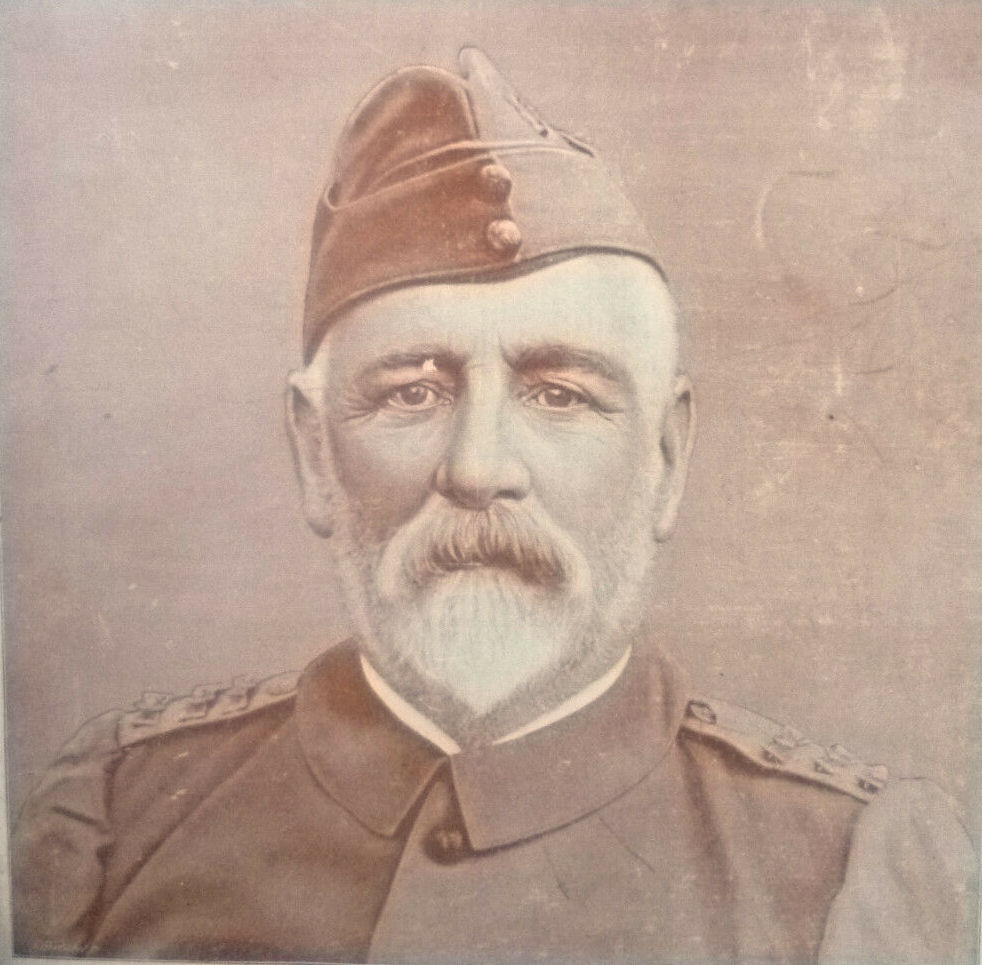
Brigadier-General John Dartnell – With the Flag to Pretoria (1899)

In 1894 the Natal Mounted Police was merged with the Colony of Natal's various police and prison services to create the Natal Police (NP), the name it was known by until it was disbanded in 1913. Even though to date the NMP had mainly served as a semi-military unit rather than a police force Dartnell was promoted to colonel and was appointed the chief commissioner of the new force. He became a JP, acted as secretary for native affairs, was commissioner of mines and inspector of prisons.

Dartnell's first move as chief commissioner was to increase the number of European police officers from 200 to 300 and he recruited an extra 100 African officers. He set up 11 police districts and increased the number of out-stations from 26 to 60. In 1894 under the new force the number of arrests made increased from 2,564 to 16,568 and Dartnell's Natal Police was so effective that his organisation was used as the model for the police forces of South Africa. In 1898 the Zululand Native Police amalgamated with the Natal Police and 10 police stations were set up in Zululand.

The Natal Police were the first to introduce finger-printing in Africa for use in forensic identification. The scheme was launched by Sub-Inspector W. J. Clarke of the Natal Police's Criminal Investigation Department (CID) who was impressed by the effective use of finger-printing for solving crime in Calcutta in 1897 and who introduced the system in Natal in 1898 at his own expense. Once it had proved its worth by leading to more arrests and crime-solving finger-printing became part of normal police procedure in Natal. So effective was the system that by 1910 the Natal Police's CID had more sets of finger-prints in its records than Scotland Yard had in its. Clarke was to succeed Dartnell as Chief Commissioner on his retirement in 1903.

== Boer War 1899–1902 ==
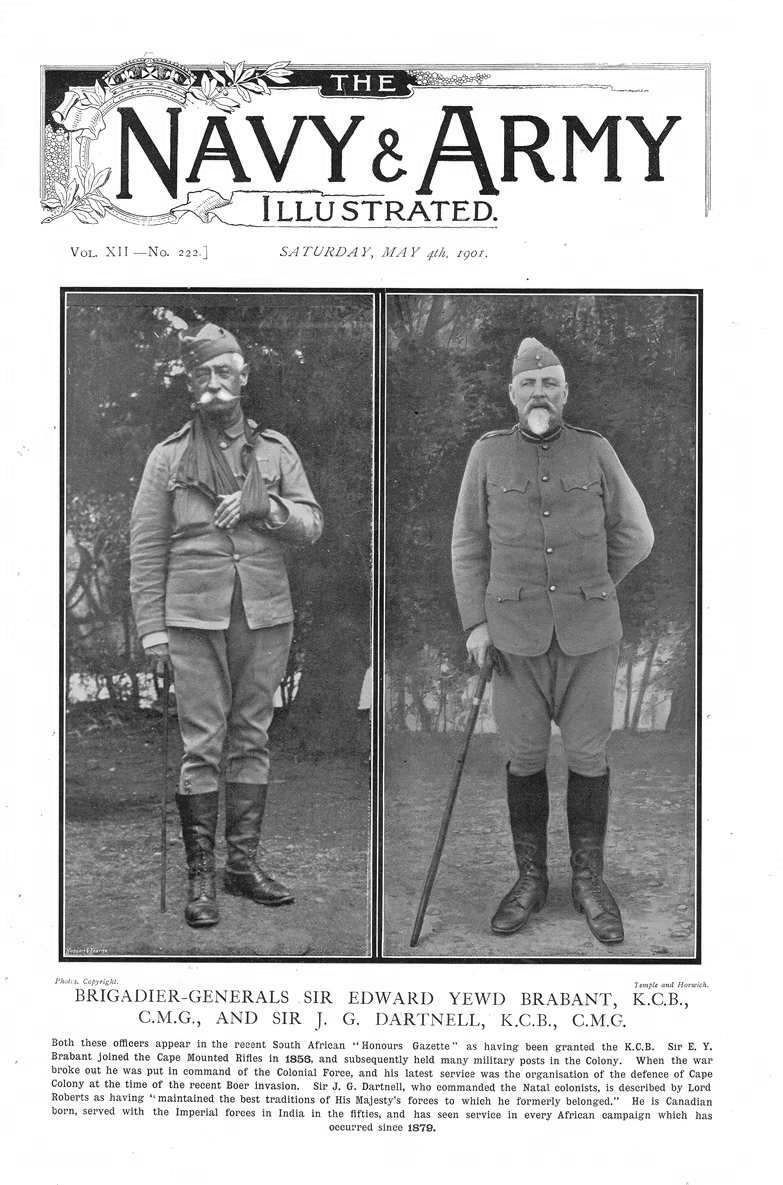
Sir Edward Yewd Brabant KCB, CMG (left) and Major General John Dartnell KCB, CMG – The Navy and Army Illustrated (1901)

At the start of the Boer War (1899–1902) Dartnell was placed on the staff of Major-general Sir William Penn Symons KCB (1843–1899) at Dundee. The men of the Natal Police at Dundee fought in the Battle of Talana Hill on 20 October 1899. The British forces, including 90 men of the Natal Police under the command of Dartnell, then retired to Ladysmith, where they became besieged during the Siege of Ladysmith. Dartnell as colonel-in-chief of the Colonial Forces was placed on General George White's staff at Ladysmith. The men of the Natal Police came under fire at Lombard's Kop on 30 October 1899. At Ladysmith the Natal Police had one man killed and three wounded while a further three died of disease.

On 7 December 1899 during the Siege the Natal Volunteers and the Imperial Light Horse launched a night attack from Ladysmith on Gun Hill with the Natal Police commanded by Dartnell guarding the left flank during the action. The Imperial Light Horse and Natal Carbineers with a team from the Royal Engineers caught the Boers off-guard and forced them to withdraw and abandon their guns. The Royal Engineers placed explosives on a howitzer artillery piece and a Long Tom, taking the breechblock from the Long Tom and removing a Maxim gun back to Ladysmith. Being on the other side of a hill the Natal Police did not hear the bugle call "retire" and were late returning to Ladysmith. Dartnell and the NP saw further action during the evening of 5 January 1900 when a picket near Caesar's Camp (named after Caesar's Camp, an ancient feature near Aldershot which it resembled) were fired on during a major assault by the Boers on the British at Wagon Hill. Early next morning the Boers shot the horses of the NP forcing them to make their own way back by foot at the same time enduring withering rifle fire. After a British counterattack the Boers withdrew.

In a bid to raise morale Dartnell was among the organisers of a children's Christmas party on 25 December 1899 for which he managed to obtain four Christmas trees which were suitably decorated while presents were given to the children by Father Christmas, who was actually a costumed regimental sergeant-major of the Imperial Light Horse. On 4 January 1900 Dartnell's empty tent received a direct hit from a Boer shell, destroying the contents. The Siege of Ladysmith ended on 28 February 1900 when an advance party of the Composite Regiment of the Mounted Brigade reached Ladysmith which including 15 members of the Natal Police.

When the Boers began to use guerilla tactics Dartnell was promoted to local brigadier-general and in April 1900 put in command of the Volunteer Brigade with the task of forcing the last of the Boers out of Natal. He served under General Sir Redvers Buller VC in 1900, and commanded the Imperial Light Horse Brigade in Orange River Colony from August 1901 and which fought in various actions.

In his official despatches of April 1901 Lord Roberts VC, commanding HM Forces in South Africa recorded of Dartnell:

Col. Dartnell, as G.O.C. Natal Colonists, has maintained the best traditions of the regular forces. His name stands very high in the estimation of the colonists, and he possesses the greatest influence over the natives. His advice was of much assistance in the earliest actions of the war, afterwards during the siege of Ladysmith, and finally in the general advance through the Biggarsberg to Laing's Nek, when Natal was cleared of the enemies of the Queen. Col. Dartnell was awarded the "K.C.B.".

Aged 63, Brigadier-General Dartnell resigned command of the Imperial Light Horse Brigade on 23 of December 1901. His QSA Medal had bars for Transvaal, Talana, Defence of Ladysmith, and Laing's Nek. For his service during the Boer War Dartnell was appointed KCB and CMG.

== Retirement ==
In 1903, after 30 years service, honorary Major-general Sir John Dartnell retired from the Natal Police and with his wife moved to Rochester in Kent, where he had lived as a boy, before later moving to Folkestone in Kent, where he died in 1913 aged 76. He was buried in Cheriton Road Cemetery in Folkestone. In his will he left an estate valued at £1,113 14s 1d.

== Medal entitlement ==
Major General John Dartnell was entitled to the following medals:

| Ribbon | Description | Notes |
| | Knight Commander of the Order of the Bath (KCB) | 1901 |
| | Companion of the Order of St Michael and St George | |
| | Colonial Auxiliary Forces Officers' Decoration | |
| | Indian Mutiny Medal | Central India |
| | India General Service Medal (1854) | Bhootan |
| | South Africa Medal (1880) | 1879 |
| | Cape of Good Hope General Service Medal | Basutoland |
| | Queen's South Africa Medal | 4 bars |
| | King's South Africa Medal | 2 bars |
| | Natal Native Rebellion Medal | |
