= South Africa Medal =

South Africa Medal may refer to:

- South Africa Medal (1853)
- South Africa Medal (1880)

== See also ==
- Queen's South Africa Medal (1899-1902)
- King's South Africa Medal (1899-1902)
