= List of people from Folkestone =

Folkestone is a town and seaside resort in Kent, England. The following is a list of those people who were either born or live in Folkestone, or had some important contribution to make to the town.

== Notable people from Folkestone ==
Table of contents:

A B C D E F G H I J K L M N O P Q R S T U V W X Y Z

== A ==
- William de Wiveleslie Abney (1843–1920) astronomer, chemist, and photographer
- Les Ames (1905–1990) cricketer
- Richard Ashworth (born 1947) Member of European Parliament

== B ==
- Julian Baggini (born 1968) philosopher and writer
- Mark Barham (born 1962) association footballer
- Peter Barkworth (1929–2006) actor
- Graham Barlow (born 1950) cricketer
- Michael Bentine (1922–1996) comedian: The Goon Show
- Lesley Brook (1917–2009) actress
- Arthur Brough (1905–1978) actor (Are You Being Served?); established Folkestone Repertory Theatre

== C ==
- John Henry Challis (1809–1880) philanthropist
- Fred Cheesmur (1908–1987) association footballer
- Jack Coggins (1911–2006) artist
- Wilkie Collins (1824–1889)
- A. E. Coppard (1878–1957) short story writer
- Bithia Mary Croker (c. 1848–1920) Irish-born novelist

== D ==
- John Dartnell (1838–1913), Commandant of the Natal Mounted Police
- Andrew Davenport (born 1965), children's TV creator, writer, composer; Teletubbies, In the Night Garden, Moon & Me
- Michael Dillon (1915–1962) physician; first trans man to undergo phalloplasty
- John Doogan (1853–1940) Irish recipient of the Victoria Cross
- Roy Douglas (1907–2015) composer and arranger

== E ==
- John Eric Erichsen (1818–1896) surgeon
- Eamon Everall (born 1948) artist, educator, founding member of Stuckism Art Movement

== F ==
- Thomas Field (1855–1936) Church of England priest

== G ==
- George Gardiner (1935–2002) politician
- Carl Gilbert (born 1948) association footballer
- Jonathan Gledhill (born 1949) Bishop of Lichfield
- Kitty Gordon (1878–1974) actress
- George Grossmith (1847–1912) comedian, writer, etc. collaborating with Gilbert and Sullivan on several operas

== H ==
- William Halcrow (1883–1958) civil engineer
- Radclyffe Hall (1880–1943) author
- William Hall-Jones (1851–1936) Prime Minister of New Zealand
- Augustus Harris (1852–1896) actor, impresario and dramatist
- Charlotte Harris (born 1981) portrait artist
- William Harvey (1578–1657) physician (discoverer of blood circulation)
- Norman Heatley (1911–2004) scientist
- Michael Hogben (born 1952) auctioneer, antiques dealer
- Billy Hughes (born 1960) footballer
- Charles Bousfield Huleatt (1863–1908) missionary; discoverer of important papyrus documents
- Jessica Hynes (Born 1972) Bafta winning actress

== I ==
- Peter Imbert (born 1933) senior police officer

== J ==
- Michael Jack (born 1946) politician
- Hattie Jacques (1924–1980) comedy actress; Carry On films

== K ==
- Alice Keppel (1868–1947) mistress of King Edward VII; great-grandmother of Camilla, Duchess of Cornwall
- Pete Kircher (born 1945) rock/pop drummer
- William Knox (1850–1913) Australian politician and businessman

== L ==
- Roderick Alastair Brook Learoyd (1913–1995) Victoria Cross recipient
- Mabel Love (1874–1953) dancer, actress

== M ==
- Francis MacKinnon (1848–1947) Test cricketer
- Mary Martin (1907–1969) sculptor
- Charles McCausland (1898–1965) cricketer
- Patrick McHale (1826–1866) Irish recipient of Victoria Cross
- Yehudi Menuhin (1916–1999) violinist; founder of Yehudi Menuhin International Competition for Young Violinists held in Folkestone
- Helena Millais (1886-1970) comedienne and actress

== N ==
- Paul Nicholas (born 1945) actor and singer

== P ==
- Sam Pepper (born 1989) Big Brother 2010 contestant.
- Edith Pechey (1845–1908) one of the first United Kingdom Women doctors.
- John Philipot (1588–1645) College of Arms.
- Samuel Plimsoll (1824–1898) politician and social reformer; the "Plimsoll line”.
- Mavis Pugh (1914–2006) comedy actress.

== Q ==
- Len Quested (1925–2012) association footballer

== R ==
- Noel Redding (1945–2003) musician; bass player with The Jimi Hendrix Experience
- Ricky Reina (born 1971) association footballer
- Baker Russell (1837–1911) senior army officer

== S ==
- Marcus Sarjeant (born 1964) attempted murderer of Queen Elizabeth II
- Blaine Sexton (1892–1966) ice hockey player
- Brendan Sheerin (born 1959) travel guide and coach-trip host
- Sheila Sherlock (1918–2001) physician and hepatologist
- Gerald Sinstadt (born 1930) sports commentator
- Susan Spain-Dunk (1880-1962) composer, conductor and violinist
- Anne Stallybrass (1938–2021) actress
- Sydney Sturgess (1915–1999) Canadian actress

== T ==
- Phil Tate (1922–2005) dance bandleader
- Cliff Temple (1948–1994) sports journalist
- Thunderstick (living) heavy rock musician; drummer
- David Tomlinson (1917–2000) actor
- Arthur Tooth (1839–1931) Ritualist priest; curate of St Mary's Folkestone
- Walter Tull (1888–1918) first black infantry officer in British Army; football (soccer) player

== U ==
- Ernest Ewart Unwin (1881–1944) educationist

== V ==
- Phil Vickery (born 1961) celebrity chef

== W ==
- Weller brothers (born 1802, 1805, 1814) were the founders of a whaling station on Otago Harbour, New Zealand. Their name lives on in the sea shanty Soon May the Wellerman Come.
- Dave Wiltshire (born 1954), association footballer
