= Cape of Good Hope General Service Medal =

British general service medal

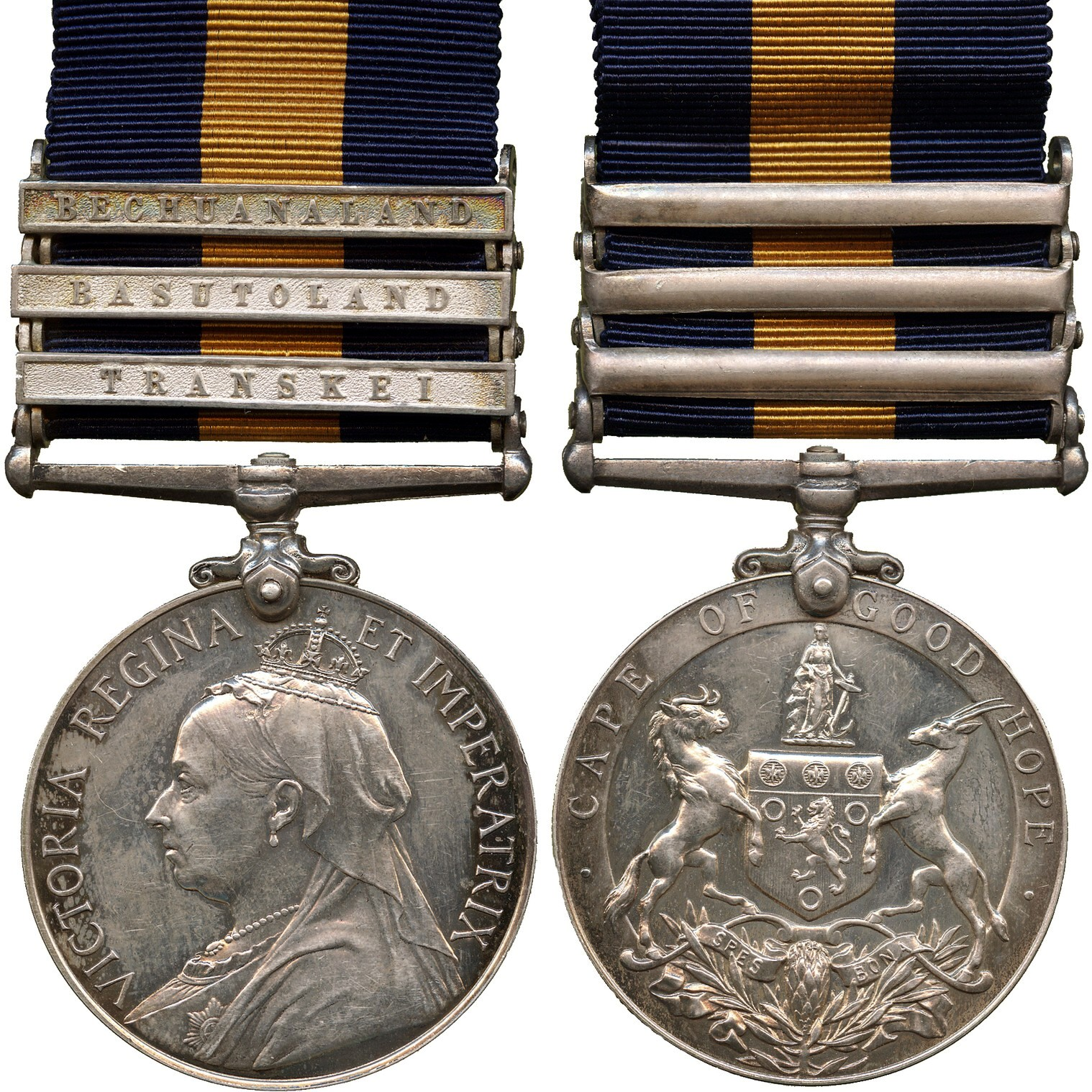
- Type: Military Campaign medal
- Awarded for: Campaign service
- Country: (United Kingdom) UK Cape of Good Hope
- Presented by: the Monarch of the United Kingdom of Great Britain and Ireland, and Empress of India
- Eligibility: Cape Colonial Forces
- Campaigns: Basutoland 1880–1881; Transkei 1880–1881; Bechuanaland 1896–1897
- Clasps: BASUTOLAND; TRANSKEI; BECHUANALAND
- Established: 1900

Highlights
- Total: 5,252
- Ribbon bar

Order of wear
- Next (higher): Kabul to Kandahar Star
- Next (lower): Egypt Medal

The Cape of Good Hope General Service Medal is a British campaign medal which was awarded to members of the Cape Colonial Forces who took part in three campaigns in and around the Cape of Good Hope, in Basutoland in 1880–1881, in Transkei in 1880–1881 and in Bechuanaland in 1896–1897.

== Institution ==
The Cape of Good Hope General Service Medal was authorised by the government of the Cape of Good Hope, and approved by Queen Victoria in December 1900. It was a retrospective award for veterans of three campaigns which were fought in South Africa between 1880 and 1897. The medal was awarded to the officers, non-commissioned officers and men of the Colonial Forces who were engaged on active service during the campaigns in Basutoland (1880–1881), Tembuland and Griqualand East in Transkei (1880–1881), and Bechuanaland (1896–1897). Three campaign clasps were authorised at the same time.

== Award criteria ==
The medal was awarded, upon application, to all surviving veterans who had served in the Cape Colonial Forces in the three campaigns, for active service in the field, for serving as guards at any point where an attack was expected, or who were detailed for some specific or special military service or duty. No medal or clasp could be awarded to any member who had deserted or had been dismissed for misconduct.

Because the award of the medal had to be applied for, it was not awarded posthumously. The next-of-kin of members who had been killed in action or who had died while on service therefore received no medal. The published medal roll shows that 5,252 medals were awarded to 5,156 individuals, which included 96 duplicate or triplicate awards.

Below are the number of medals recorded with each bar combination on the original issue register. The figures in brackets are the actual number of recipients, excluding duplicate awards.

- Transkei only – 562 (556)
- Basutoland only – 1,589 (1,570)
- Bechuanaland only – 2,483 (2,422)
- Two clasps: Transkei & Basutoland – 490 (484)
- Two clasps: Transkei & Bechuanaland – 18
- Two clasps: Basutoland & Bechuanaland – 77 (72)
- Three clasps – 23
- No clasp – 10 (Possibly awarded with a clasp, but not recorded on the register)

In all, 1,093 Transkei, 2,179 Basutoland and 2,601 Bechuanaland clasps were awarded.

No British Army units were present at any of the campaigns, although fifteen British soldiers who had been seconded to local units received the medal.

=== Basuto Gun War ===
The duration of the Basutoland Campaign was from 13 September 1880 to 27 April 1881. Following the end of the Zulu wars from 1877 to 1879, Cape of Good Hope Governor Henry Bartle Frere and Prime Minister Gordon Sprigg attempted to disarm the Basotho and ordered them to hand in their firearms. Some chiefs reluctantly complied, but were almost immediately attacked by chiefs who had refused to comply, such as Lerothodi and Moletsane. In September 1880 they also attacked white administrators and, as a result, troops were mobilised and the Basuto Gun War broke out. Various encounters ensued until February 1881, when an armistice was arranged. Peace was eventually concluded in May 1881. Veterans of this campaign were awarded the Basutoland Clasp.

=== Transkei Campaign ===
The duration of the Transkei Campaign was from 13 September 1880 to 13 May 1881. The medal and the Transkei Clasp were awarded for operations in Thembuland and Griqualand East, where the native Xhosa populations were particularly hostile to settlers in the districts of Tsolo, Maclear, Matatiele and Qumbu.

=== Bechuanaland Campaign ===
The duration of the Bechuanaland Campaign was from 24 December 1896 to 30 July 1897. In April 1896, a severe outbreak of cattle disease occurred, which required that all cattle in the area needed to be slaughtered in an attempt to contain the disease. This was resented by the local Tswana population who, as a result, rose up in protest. A number of engagements occurred and, following a build-up of more Colonial reinforcements in July 1897, the conflict ended after a final action at Langberg on 30 July and 1 August 1897, in which most of the Tswana leaders were either killed or surrendered. Veterans of this campaign were awarded the Bechuanaland Clasp.

== Description ==
The medal was struck in silver and is a disk, 36 millimetres (1.4 in) in diameter and 3 millimetres (0.12 in) thick at the raised rim. It is affixed to the swivelling suspender by means of claws and a pin through the upper edge of the medal. The recipient's rank, name and unit were inscribed on the rim, but the medals were not numbered.

Obverse

The obverse depicts the veiled bust of Queen Victoria, with the legend "VICTORIA REGINA ET IMPERATRIX" around the inside of the raised rim. The designer was Sir Joseph Boehm.

Reverse

The reverse displays the Cape of Good Hope coat of arms, with a spray of protea leaves and a protea flower underneath and the name "CAPE OF GOOD HOPE" on a wide raised rim around the top half of the medal.

Ribbon

The ribbon is 32 millimetres (1.3 in) wide and dark blue, with a 12 millimetres (0.47 in) wide yellow centre band. These were also the ribbon colours of the two earlier campaign medals for service in southern Africa.

Clasps

The three clasps which were awarded to indicate the campaigns in which recipients had served, were inscribed "BASUTOLAND", "TRANSKEI" and "BECHUANALAND" respectively.

== Order of wear ==
Campaign medals and stars are not listed by name in the order of wear prescribed by the British Central Chancery of the Orders of Knighthood, but are all grouped together as taking precedence after the Queen's Medal for Chiefs and before the Polar Medals, in order of the date of the campaign for which awarded.

In the order of wear of British campaign medals, the Cape of Good Hope General Service Medal takes precedence after the Kabul to Kandahar Star and before the Egypt Medal.

=== South Africa ===
With effect from 6 April 1952, when a new South African set of decorations and medals was instituted to replace the British awards used to date, the older British decorations and medals applicable to South Africa continued to be worn in the same order of precedence but, with the exception of the Victoria Cross, took precedence after all South African orders, decorations and medals awarded to South Africans on or after that date. Of the official British campaign medals which were applicable to South Africans, the Cape of Good Hope General Service Medal takes precedence as shown.

- Preceded by the South Africa Medal (1880).
- Succeeded by the Queen's South Africa Medal.
