= Kabul to Kandahar Star =

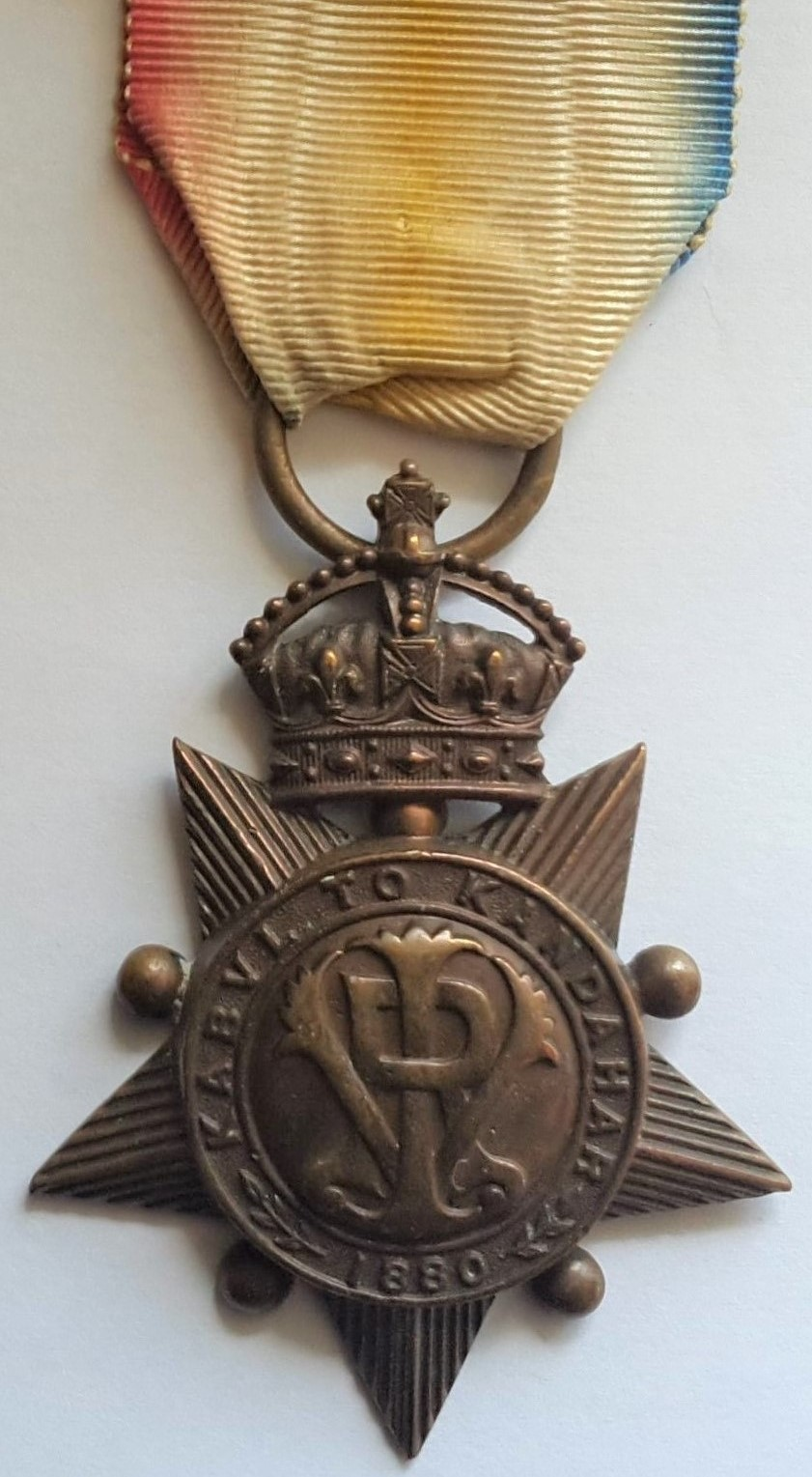
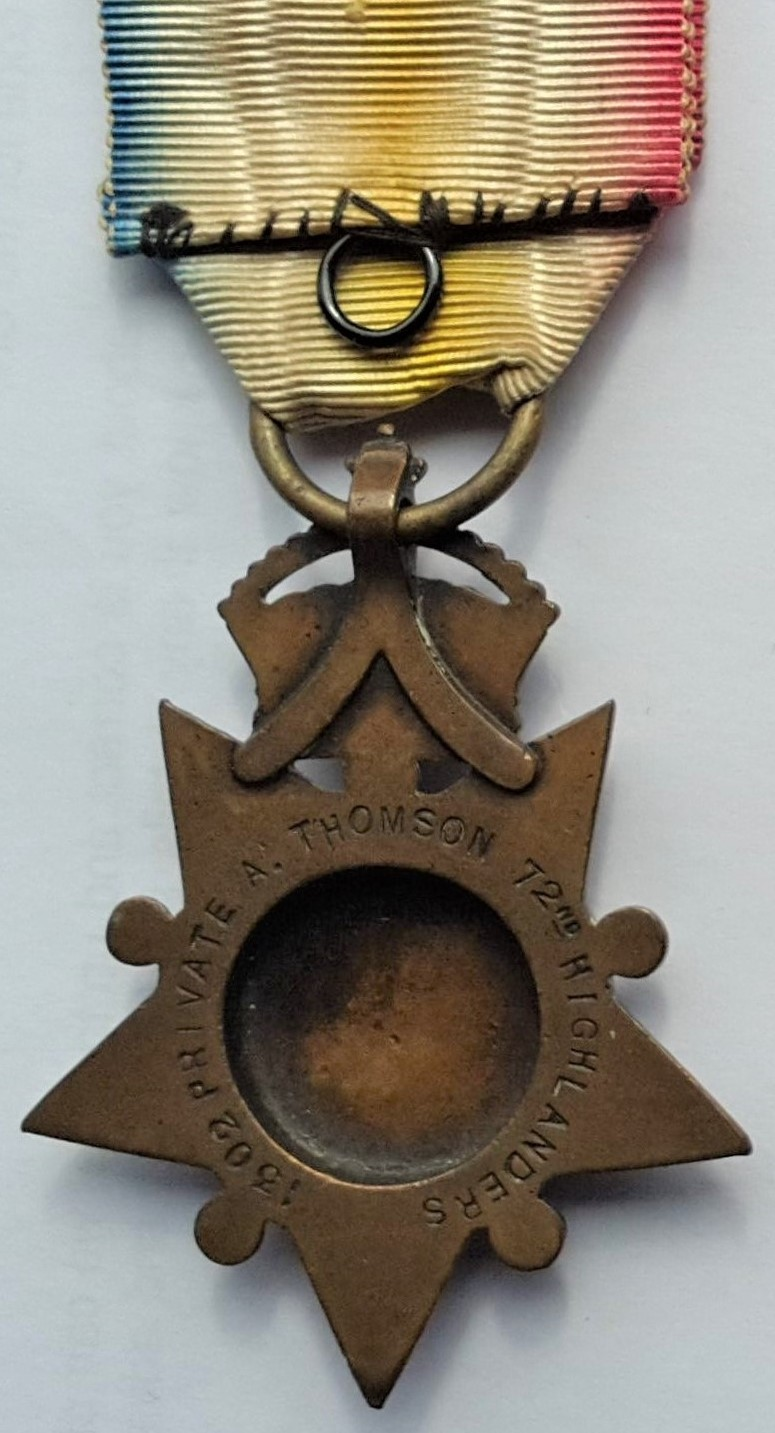
- Obverse and reverse of the medal
- Type: Campaign medal
- Awarded for: Campaign Service
- Presented by: UK
- Eligibility: British and Indian Armies
- Campaigns: Relief of Kandahar, 9–31 August 1880
- Established: 19 March 1881

Highlights
- Total: Just over 11,000
- Ribbon bar of the medal
- Related: Afghanistan Medal

The Kabul to Kandahar Star, also known as the Roberts Star or Kandahar Bronze Star, was awarded to those British and Indian troops who participated in the 320 mile march from Kabul to Kandahar in Afghanistan between 9–31 August 1880, under the command of Lieutenant-General Sir Frederick Roberts. In addition, it was awarded to the troops stationed en route at Kelat-i-Ghilzie, who accompanied General Roberts on the final ninety miles to Kandahar.

An episode of the Second Afghan War, the march took place to relieve Kandahar, where a British force was being besieged by Afghan forces. On reaching Kandahar, Roberts decisively beat the Afghans on 1 September 1880 at the Battle of Kandahar and lifted the siege. The war was concluded soon after.

Just over 11,000 were awarded, all recipients also receiving the Afghanistan Medal, usually with the 'Kandahar' bar.

The march received much publicity in the United Kingdom, and its success was a cause of much celebration. This explains why a special medal was authorised, even though those involved had already qualified for the Afghanistan Medal. General Roberts was surprised at the strength of the public reaction, which he attributed to:

"the glamour of romance thrown around an army of 10,000 men lost to view, as it were, for nearly a month, about the fate of which uninformed speculation was rife and pessimistic rumours were spread, until the tension became extreme, and the corresponding relief proportionably great when that army reappeared to dispose at once of Ayub Khan, [the Afghan commander] and his hitherto victorious troops."

== Description ==
The medal is a bronze five-pointed star 62mm high and 48mm wide, suspended by the Imperial Crown. It was made from guns captured at the Battle of Kandahar.
Obverse: in the middle is the royal monogram VRI, surrounded by the text "Kabul to Kandahar 1880".
Reverse: plain with a hollow centre, with the name of the recipient around the edge.
Ribbon: watered silk pattern with a rainbow of red, white, yellow, white and blue, a design used by several campaign medals of the former East India Company and representing an eastern sky at sunrise.

The medal was manufactured by Henry Jenkins and Sons of Birmingham, who also made the Egyptian Khedive's Star of 1882.
