= South Africa Medal (1853) =

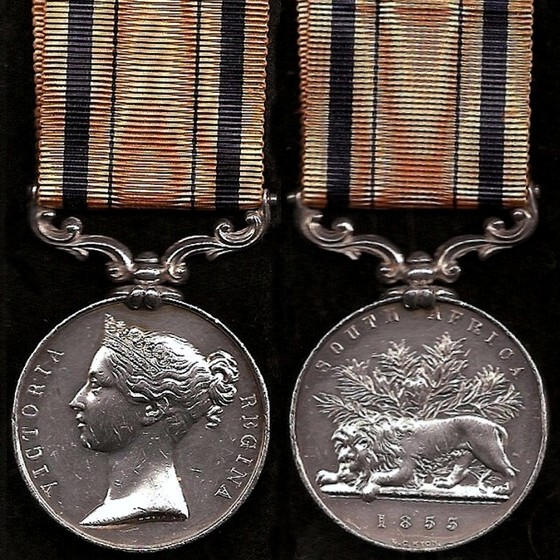
- Type: Military Campaign medal
- Awarded for: Campaign service
- Country: United Kingdom
- Presented by: the Monarch of the United Kingdom of Great Britain and Ireland
- Eligibility: British forces
- Campaigns: 1834–36 First Kaffir War; 1846–47 Second Kaffir War; 1850–53 Third Kaffir War; 1852 Battle of Berea
- Clasps: None
- Established: 1854
- Ribbon bar

Order of wear
- Next (higher): Waterloo Medal
- Next (lower): Ghuznee Medal
- Related: South Africa Medal (1880)

The South Africa Medal (1853) is a campaign medal instituted in 1854, for award to officers and men of the Royal Navy, British Army and locally recruited Cape Mounted Riflemen, who served in the Cape of Good Hope during the Xhosa Wars (called the 'Kaffir Wars' at the time) between 1834 and 1853.

== Institution ==
In 1854, Queen Victoria instituted the South Africa Medal for award to members of the Royal Navy, British Army and local forces who had served in any one of three of the South African Xhosa Wars on the Eastern Frontier of the Cape of Good Hope.

== Award criteria ==
The South Africa Medal (1853) was awarded to surviving participants in one or more of three campaigns in the eastern Cape of Good Hope and the Battle of Berea:

- The 1834–36 Sixth Frontier War.
- The 1846–47 Seventh Frontier War.
- The 1850–53 Eighth Frontier War.

At the time these were known as the First, Second and Third Kaffir Wars.

No clasps were awarded, therefore it is not possible to determine which of the wars any particular medal was awarded for, without reference to the appropriate medal rolls.

== Campaigns ==
The 1834–36 campaign began with a response to a Xhosa cattle raid when, on 11 December 1834, a Cape Government Commando party killed a chief of high rank. This incensed the Xhosa and an army of 10,000 men swept across the frontier into the Cape of Good Hope, pillaged and burned homesteads and killed all who resisted. In response, Boer commandos under Piet Retief, Burgher and Khoikhoi commandos and British Imperial troops which arrived via Algoa Bay launched a retaliatory campaign.

The 1846–47 and 1851–53 campaigns were both fought against the Gaika tribe of King Sandile kaNgqika, who resented British land encroachments and had recently begun to receive fire-arms.

On 26 February 1852 the troopship HMS Birkenhead struck a rock off what is now Gansbaai in the Western Cape while transporting reinforcing troops to Algoa Bay. The ship sank within 20 minutes and, since there were not enough serviceable lifeboats for all the passengers, the soldiers aboard stood fast rather than escape, allowing the women and children to reach the lifeboats in safety. Of the 639 persons on board, only 193 survived. A number of the survivors were soldiers who went on to serve in South Africa and receive this medal.

In December 1852, a British force under Major-General Sir George Cathcart engaged in a punitive expedition against the Basuto of King Moshoeshoe I in an effort to recover stolen cattle. The expedition culminated in the Battle of Berea, the survivors of which received the South Africa Medal (which bore the date 1853) in 1855.

== Description ==
The medal was struck in silver and is a disk, 36 millimetres in diameter, with a swivelling suspender. Designed by William Wyon and his son Leonard Charles Wyon, with the dies for the medal engraved by Leonard Charles Wyon.

Obverse

The medal's obverse displays the diademed head of Queen Victoria, facing left. The medal is inscribed "VICTORIA" at left and "REGINA" at right around the perimeter. The name of designer W. Wyon is inscribed on the truncation of the Queen's neck.

Reverse

The reverse shows a crouching lion on a plinth in front of a protea bush with a single flower. The medal is inscribed "SOUTH AFRICA" around the top perimeter and has the year "1853" in the exergue. The name of engraver L.C. Wyon is inscribed at the bottom, below the year.

Naming

The name and regiment of the recipient is impressed on the rim in block Roman capitals, in the same style as found on the Military General Service Medal.

Ribbon

The ribbon is 32 millimetres wide, with a 2½ millimetres wide golden yellow band, a 4 millimetres wide dark blue band, a 3 millimetres wide golden yellow band and a ½ millimetre wide dark blue band, repeated in reverse order and separated by a 12 millimetres wide golden yellow band.

== Discontinuation ==
Army Order No. 103 of August 1880 instituted a new South Africa Medal. While it made no mention of any change in the design of the South Africa Medal (1853), the year "1853" was replaced in the new medal's reverse exergue by a military trophy, consisting of a Zulu ox-hide shield and four crossed assegais. The obverse of the new medal is identical to that of the South Africa Medal (1853).

== Order of wear ==
Campaign medals are not listed by name in the order of wear prescribed by the British Central Chancery of the Orders of Knighthood, but are grouped together as taking precedence after the Queen's Medal for Chiefs and before the Polar Medals, in order of the date of the campaign for which awarded.

=== South Africa ===
On 6 April 1952 the Union of South Africa instituted its own range of military decorations and medals. These new awards were worn before all earlier British decorations and medals awarded to South Africans, with the exception of the Victoria Cross, which still took precedence before all other awards. The South Africa Medal (1853) is the oldest official British campaign medal applicable to South Africa, and takes precedence as shown below.

- Preceded by the British Empire Medal (Military) (BEM).
- Succeeded by the South Africa Medal (1880).
