= Caesar's Camp, Rushmoor and Waverley =

Iron Age hillfort in Hampshire, England

Coordinates: 51.243°N 0.804°W

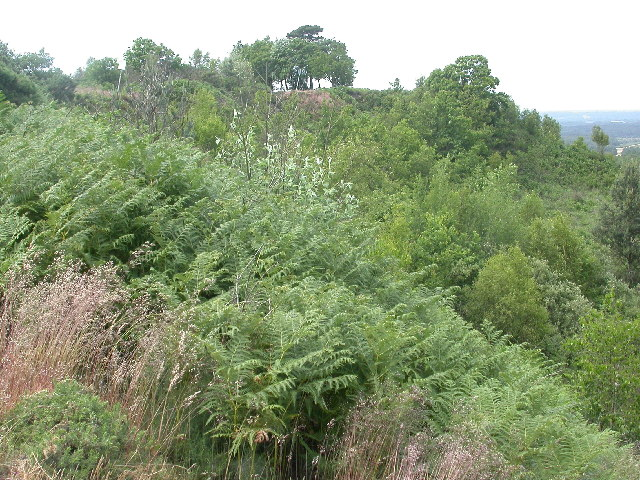
View of the south scarp of Caesar's Camp

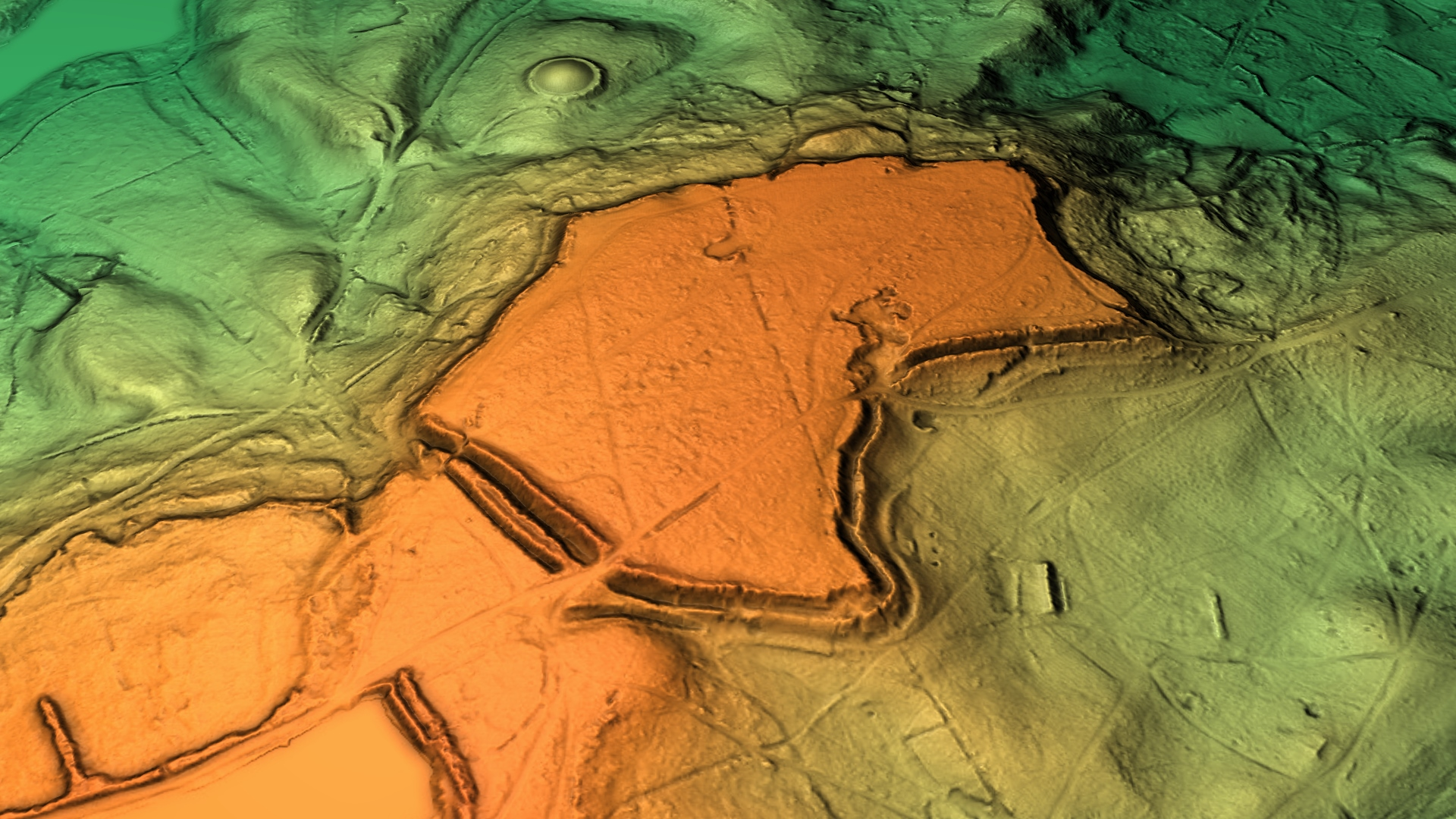
View of the 3D digital terrain model

Caesar's Camp is an Iron Age hill fort straddling the border of the counties of Surrey and Hampshire in southern England. The fort straddles the borough of Waverley in Surrey and the borough of Rushmoor and the district of Hart, both in Hampshire. Caesar's Camp is a scheduled monument with a list entry identification number of 1007895. It lies approximately 3 kilometres (1.9 mi) north of the town of Farnham, and a similar distance west of Aldershot. The hillfort lies entirely within the Bourley and Long Valley Site of Special Scientific Interest. Caesar's Camp is a multivallate hillfort, a fort with multiple defensive rings, occupying an irregular promontory, with an entrance on the south side. The site has been much disturbed by military activity, especially at the southeast corner. The remains of the hillfort are considered to be of national importance.

== History ==
It is possible that Caesar's Camp developed in the Late Bronze Age, as a fort associated with the River Wey. There were three Iron Age phases of the fort. In its earliest form, Caesar's Camp was a univallate fort. In its second phase of development, the defences were multivallate with a timber palisade. Later, a bank was built over the line of the palisade, replacing it. After the third phase, the site was apparently abandoned until the medieval period, when a park pale was built, making use of the final phase of the Iron Age defences. Caesar's Camp belonged to the Farnham estate of the Bishop of Winchester in the 11th century; by the 13th century it formed part of a park associated with Farnham Castle.

== Site description ==
Caesar's Camp stands 177 metres (581 ft) above mean sea level, and the Bagshot Beds of sand surface on the northern slopes of the hill. The area around the hillfort features extensive areas of open heathland. The defences on the east side have been damaged by a modern quarry. The interior of the fort is largely undisturbed, and the rarity of large multivallate Iron Age forts has resulted in Caesar's Camp being regarded as of national importance by Historic England.

The fort is large and encloses an area of 10.5 hectares (26 acres). The earthwork ramparts and ditches largely follow the contours of the hill. The ramparts cut across the neck of the plateau on the south side; on the north and northeast sides there are no earthwork defences since the steep scarps render them unnecessary. On the southwest side, marshland was incorporated into the defences, and gaps in the rampart occur in that area. On the east side the defences consisted of a double rampart. The inner rampart is 10 metres (33 ft) wide and 3 metres (9.8 ft) high; the ditch between the ramparts is 2 metres (6.6 ft) deep and 5 metres (16 ft) wide. The outer rampart is 6 metres (20 ft) wide and stands 2 metres (6.6 ft) high. Outside the second rampart is another ditch, this measuring 1 metre (3.3 ft) deep. On the southeast side, the defences consisted of a triple rampart and a counter-scarp bank that continued to the south side. The fort's defences were strongest on the south, where they cut across level ground.

The main entrance to the fort is believed to have been halfway along the east side; however, direct evidence is lacking due to the damage caused to the supposed entrance by modern quarrying. A trackway cuts through the strong defences on the south side, but this may be modern.

The medieval park pale is evident as a bank and accompanying ditch running along the western edge of Caesar's Camp. The bank is 2 metres (6.6 ft) wide and stands 1 metre (3.3 ft) high. The ditch runs on the inside of the bank and measures 2.5 metres (8.2 ft) wide and is 0.5 metres (1.6 ft) deep. Some 60 to 70 metres (200 to 230 ft) outside the rampart on the southwest side are the remains of what has been interpreted as a defensive outlier, or an earlier version of the defences, consisting of a low 7-metre (23 ft) wide rampart. However, this feature may instead be the misinterpreted remains of the medieval park pale, the spoil of which was thrown over the Iron Age defences.

The fort's height and proximity to Farnborough airport make it a popular spot to view Farnborough Airshow for free. On a clear day, major London landmarks can be seen from its top including the Shard, Canary Wharf and the Wembley Arch.

== Finds ==
A 15-square-metre (160 sq ft) trench was excavated by N. Riall in 1983.

Miscellaneous finds at Caesar's Camp include a Roman roof tile, which is now held in Camberley Museum, and an early rapier dating to the Middle Bronze Age (c. 1500–1000 BC). The sword has been assigned to the Thetford Class of Trump's Group II, characterised by a trapezoid butt with two notches, and dated to 1200–1000 BC. The weapon is forged from a copper alloy and has a fluted blade with three central ribs. It has a total length of 305 millimetres (12.0 in); the blade is 19 millimetres (0.75 in) wide and 7 millimetres (0.28 in) thick. The hilt plate is 48 millimetres (1.9 in) wide. This sword is now held in the British Museum.
