= Prince Imperial of France =

Defunct title

Coat of arms of the Prince Imperial of France

Prince Imperial (French: prince impérial) of France was a title originally created under the Constitution of the Year XII, in 1804, to designate the eldest son of the Emperor of the French under the First French Empire. The title was revived under the Sénatus-Consulte of 25 December 1852, to serve the same role under the Second French Empire. Unlike the similar titles of Prince Imperial of Brazil and Prince Imperial of Mexico, however, the title could not be kept in use by the House of Bonaparte after the death of Napoléon, Prince Imperial, as the wording both of the Constitution of the Year XII and the Sénatus-Consulte of 25 December 1852 explicitly specifies that the title shall be borne by the eldest son of the Emperor (and, consequently, with no Emperor there can be no Prince Imperial).

== Overview ==
The title of Prince Imperial of France was initially established under Article 9 of the Constitution of the Year XII, which provided that the eldest son of the Emperor would bear the title of Prince Imperial, while the other members of the French Imperial Family would bear the title of French Prince. However, the title was eclipsed under the First Empire by the additional title of King of Rome, which was granted to Napoleon II upon birth.

Following the coalition victory in the War of the Sixth Coalition, Emperor Napoleon I was forced to accept the terms of the Treaty of Fontainebleau. The Treaty's first article functioned as an act of abdication, by which Napoleon I renounced, for himself, his descendants, and all other members of his family. While the second article provided that the Emperor, his wife, and his "mother, brothers, sisters nephews and nieces" would be entitled to retain, as courtesy titles, the substantive titles they then held, it made no such provision for Napoleon II, who was granted instead the title of "Prince of Parma, of Placentia, and of Guastalla" under the Treaty's fifth article. Consequently, Napoleon II lost the titles of King of Rome and Prince Imperial of France upon the Treaty's conclusion.

A few days short of nine months after the Treaty of Fontainebleau was concluded, Napoleon I, reacting to the recovery of his own popularity among the French people, Legitimists in France and diplomats at the Congress of Vienna openly calling for his further exile to the Azores or Saint Helena (or, in some cases, hinting at his assassination), and the fact that the coalition was distracted for the moment by infighting at Vienna, returned to France from his exile in Elba, inaugurating the Hundred Days. Reinstating the Constitution of the Year XII, Napoleon I's return to Paris caused the title of Prince Imperial of France once again to be conferred upon his son. However, following the decisive French defeat at the Battle of Waterloo, Napoleon I, bowing to political pressure, finally abdicated in favor of his son on 22 June 1815. On 26 June (the day following Napoleon I's final departure from Paris), the Provisional Government established upon the abdication indirectly deposed the four-year old Emperor Napoleon II, in a proclamation specifying that all processes and instruments would thereafter be issued in the name of the French people, rather than in the name of the young Emperor. Soon thereafter, the House of Bourbon was restored for the second time in as many years, after the Provisional Government failed to secure concessions from the victorious coalition, conclusively ending the First French Empire.

As Napoleon II ceased to be the Prince Imperial as soon as his short reign began, and no one could hold the title without being the eldest son of an Emperor of the French, the title fell into disuse until after the establishment of the Second French Empire under Napoleon III. Article 6 of the Sénatus-Consulte of 25 December 1852 was nearly a verbatim copy of the text of Article 9 of the Constitution of the Year XII, stating once again that the eldest son of the Emperor would bear the title of Prince Imperial, while the other members of the Imperial Family would bear the title of French Prince, including those that served in the military during the Franco Prussia conflict. Three and a half years later, the second and final substantive holder of the title of Prince Imperial of France, Napoléon, Prince Imperial, was born. In contrast to the First Empire, wherein the title of Prince Imperial had been eclipsed by that of King of Rome, Prince Imperial was the primary substantive title of its second holder. Napoléon, Prince Imperial continued to hold the title substantively from birth until the Second Empire was overthrown on 4 September 1870. Thereafter, he continued to hold it as a courtesy title until he was killed in a skirmish during the Anglo-Zulu War.

== List of princes imperial ==
Image	Name	Lifespan	Tenure	Notes
	Napoleon II	20 March 1811 – 22 July 1832	20 March 1811 – 6 April 1814; 20 March 1815 – 22 June 1815	Held title as Prince Imperial of France and King of Rome from birth until the initial abdication of his father, and again held the title of Prince Imperial from the beginning of the Hundred Days until his father's second abdication. Held the title of Emperor of the French regnally from 22 June to 7 July 1815, and in pretense for the remainder of his life thereafter.
	Napoléon, Prince Imperial	16 March 1856 – 1 June 1879	16 March 1856 – 4 September 1870	Held title as Prince Imperial of France from birth until the proclamation of the Third Republic in 1870. Thereafter continued to hold the title of Prince Imperial of France as a courtesy title for the remainder of his life, and held the title of Emperor of the French in pretense from the death of his father to his own death.

== See also ==
- Dauphin of France
- List of heirs to the French throne
- Napoléon, Prince Imperial
- Prince Imperial of Brazil
- Prince Imperial of Mexico
- Line of succession to the French throne (Bonapartist)
