= South Africa Medal (1880) =

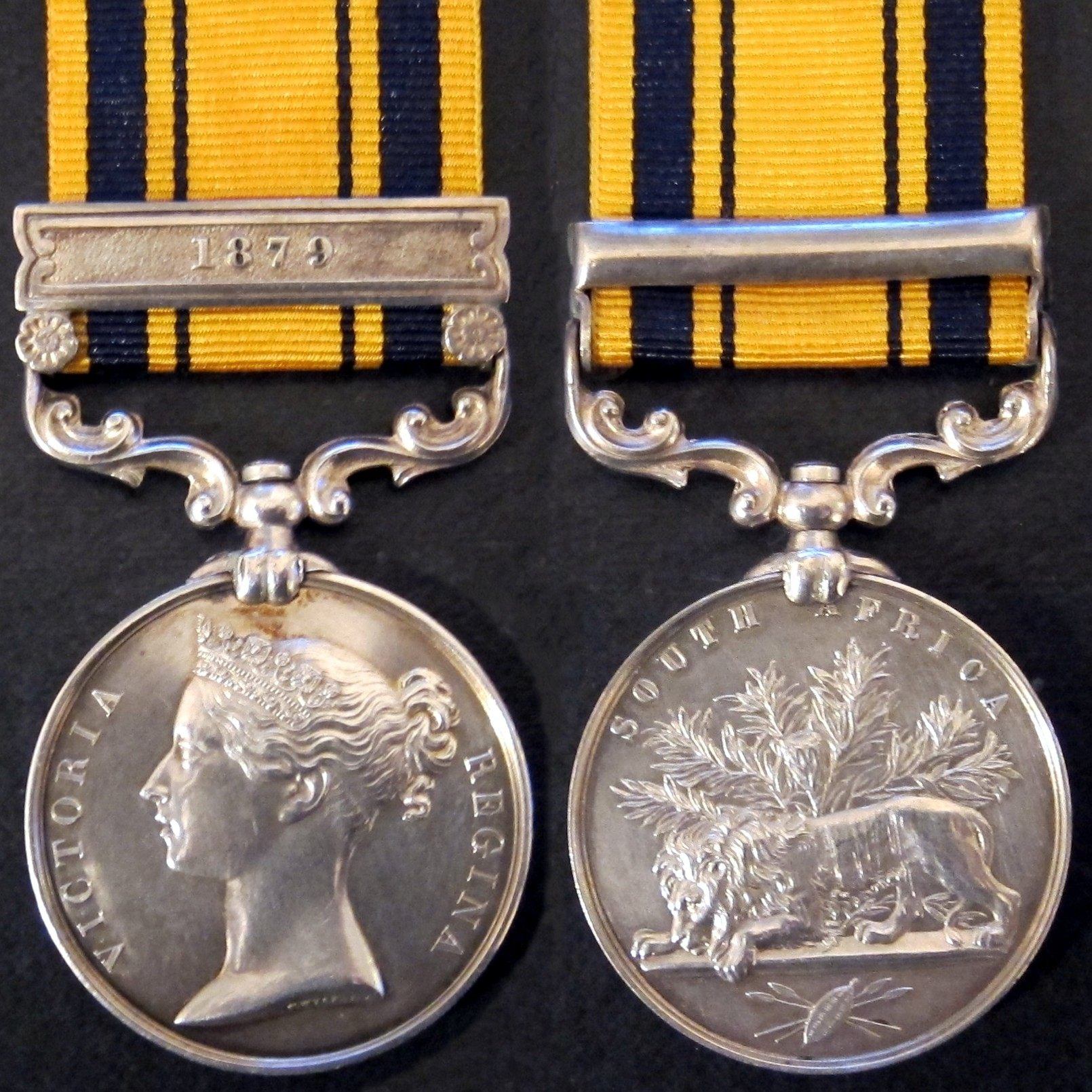
- Type: Military Campaign medal
- Awarded for: Campaign service
- Country: United Kingdom
- Presented by: the Monarch of the United Kingdom of Great Britain and Ireland, and Empress of India
- Eligibility: British forces & Colonial volunteers
- Campaigns: Gaika-Gcaleka War 1877-8; War against Chief Pokwane 1878; Griqua War 1878; Sekhukhune War 1878; Anglo-Zulu War 1879; War against Chief Moirosi 1879; Sekhukhune War 1879
- Clasps: 1877; 1877-8; 1877-8-9; 1877-9; 1878; 1878-9; 1879
- Established: 1 August 1880

Highlights
- Total: Circa 36,600
- Ribbon bar

Order of wear
- Next (higher): Ashantee Medal
- Next (lower): Afghanistan Medal (United Kingdom)
- Related: South Africa Medal (1853)

The South Africa Medal (1880), often referred to as the Zulu War Medal, is a campaign medal instituted in 1880 and awarded by the British Government to members of the British Army, Royal Naval Brigade and Colonial Volunteers who were involved in a series of South African tribal wars in the Cape of Good Hope, Colony of Natal and Transvaal between 1877 and 1879, most notably for the Anglo-Zulu War of 1879.

== Institution ==
In 1854, Queen Victoria had given approval for the award of the South Africa Medal (1853) to members of the British Army who had served in any one of the three South African Xhosa Wars of 1834–36, 1846–47 and 1850–53 on the Eastern Frontier of the Cape of Good Hope.

Between 1877 and 1879 a number of particularly difficult punitive expeditions were mounted by the British against Xhosa, Zulu and Basuto tribes in the eastern area of the Cape of Good Hope and northern Natal, as well as against the Bapedi of Chief Sekhukhune in the northern Transvaal. In 1880 a medal was sanctioned for these campaigns, which was a new version of the South Africa Medal (1853) with minor alterations to the reverse design.

While Army Order no. 103 of August 1880, which instituted the new South Africa Medal (1880), made no mention of any change in design of the 1854 medal, the year "1853" in the older medal's reverse exergue was replaced by a military trophy consisting of a Zulu ox-hide shield and four crossed assegais. The obverse of the new medal remained identical to that of the earlier medal.

== Recipients ==
A total of approximately 36,600 medals were awarded.

== Award criteria ==
The new version of the medal was instituted in 1880 to recognise service in a number of campaigns over the preceding three years to bring the eastern area of the Cape of Good Hope and northern Natal under British control, which effectively meant the pacification by force of the local tribes. The medal could be awarded to all personnel, including British regular forces, Colonial Volunteers and native levies, who had served in any of the campaigns in South Africa between September 1877 and December 1879. The military operations during this period were a series of separate campaigns against specific tribes and the unrest would eventually culminate in the Anglo-Zulu War in 1879. Hence, the medal is often referred to as the Zulu War Medal.

Fourteen medals without clasp were awarded to nurses who served in Natal during the Anglo-Zulu War. A War Office committee, appointed to consider their claim, had previously ruled against granting medals, there being no precedent to award campaign medals to women. However, after a number of nurses received the Egypt Medal for their services during the 1882 Anglo-Egyptian War, the committee's decision was reversed. This was therefore the earliest campaign in which women received a British campaign medal.

== Campaigns ==
The campaigns were the Gaika-Gcaleka War from 26 September 1877 to 28 June 1878, the action against Chief Pokwane from 21 to 28 January 1878, the Griqua War from 24 April to 13 November 1878, the action against Chief Sekhukhune in late 1878, the Anglo-Zulu War from 11 January to 1 September 1879, the action against the uprising in Basutoland under Chief Moirosi from 25 March to 20 November 1879 and the second action against Chief Sekhukhune from 11 November to 2 December 1879.

=== Zululand ===
King Cetshwayo kaMpande became King of the Zulus in 1873, but had been their effective ruler since 1856. Cetshwayo perceived the British as a threat to his rule and embarked upon a programme to equip his army with muskets, while inciting revolts among other tribes all along the British and Boer borders with the Zulus. Actions to counter these revolts and attacks escalated and led to reinforcements being sent from Britain over the course of 1878 to quell Cetshwayo and his uprisings.

=== Gaika-Gcaleka War ===
The Gaika-Gcaleka War was a series of punitive campaigns which resulted from the attacks of the Gcaleka and Gaika tribes on a protected people, the Fengu. The campaigns against the insurgent Gcaleka and Gaika lasted some eight months and were carried out by local Colonial Forces as well as contingents of both the British Army and the Royal Navy serving ashore. The Gaika-Gcaleka War, which became known as the Ninth Cape Frontier War, ended with the annexation of the Transkei, homeland of the Gcaleka peoples, to the Cape of Good Hope.

=== Sekhukhune Wars ===
Once the Gaika-Gcaleka War was settled, those forces not embroiled in the developing conflict in Zululand were employed against a Basuto tribe in the northern Transvaal, the Bapedi of Chief Sekhukhune, whose raids had begun to affect tribes under British protection. After an initial sally against his fortress at Thaba Ya Leolo in late 1878 had proved ineffective, a larger force overran his fortress in November 1879. The defenders of the fortress were killed almost to a man, largely by African soldiery.

=== Anglo-Zulu War ===
Even though an independent commission had adjudged in 1878 that most of the Zulu claims to border territories were justified, the repeated infractions and raids which were either perpetrated or provoked by the Zulu subjects of Cetshwayo led to a decision by the British commissioner in the area, Sir Henry Bartle Frere, to finally reduce the independence of the Zulu Kingdom. He demanded a complete disarmament on the part of the Zulus and the imposition of a British residency. When Cetshwayo ignored this demand, British forces invaded Zululand in January 1879. After an initial British defeat in the Battle of Isandlwana, reinforcements ensured British victory in the Battle of Ulundi, after which most of the Zulu chiefs sought peace. Cetshwayo became a fugitive and was eventually captured and imprisoned in Cape Town.

== Description ==
The medal was struck in silver and is a disk, 36 millimetres in diameter, with a swivelling suspender.

Obverse

The medal's obverse displays the diademed head of Queen Victoria, facing left. The medal is inscribed "VICTORIA" at left and "REGINA" at right around the perimeter.

Reverse

The reverse shows a crouching lion on a plinth in front of a protea bush with a single flower. The medal is inscribed "SOUTH AFRICA" around the top perimeter and has a military trophy consisting of a Zulu ox-hide shield and four crossed assegais in the exergue.

Clasps

Seven clasps were awarded, inscribed as shown below, to recipients who had served in a campaign in the year(s) denoted on the clasp. Only one clasp was awarded with each medal.

- "1877" – 153 clasps awarded.
- "1877-8" – 5,822 clasps awarded.
- "1877-8-9" – 3,525 clasps awarded to recipients who had qualifying service in all three years.
- "1877-9" – Eight clasps awarded to recipients who had qualifying service in 1877 and 1879, with no service in 1878.
- "1878" – 2,009 clasps awarded.
- "1878-9" – 1,185 clasps awarded.
- "1879" – 18,332 clasps awarded.

In addition, 5,610 no clasp medals were awarded to members of the military who, during the Anglo-Zulu War in 1879, had been mobilised in Natal but who had not crossed the Tugela River into Zululand. This included Naval shore parties. Since fighting was confined to the northern side of the Tugela, the no-clasp medals are frequently viewed as non-combat awards.

Naming

The number, rank, name and regiment of the recipient is engraved on the rim of the medal in capital letters.

Ribbon

The ribbon is similar to that of the South Africa Medal (1853), but with wider blue pinstripe bands. It is 32 millimetres wide, with a 2½ millimetres wide golden yellow band, a 4 millimetres wide blue band, a 3 millimetres wide golden yellow band and a 1 millimetre wide blue band, repeated in reverse order and separated by an 11 millimetres wide golden yellow band.

== Order of wear ==
Campaign medals are not listed by name in the order of wear prescribed by the British Central Chancery of the Orders of Knighthood, but are grouped together as taking precedence after the Queen's Medal for Chiefs and before the Polar Medals, in order of the date of the campaign for which awarded.

=== South Africa ===
On 6 April 1952 the Union of South Africa instituted its own range of military decorations and medals. These new awards were worn before all earlier British decorations and medals awarded to South Africans, with the exception of the Victoria Cross, which still took precedence before all other awards. Of the British campaign medals applicable to South Africans, the South Africa Medal (1880) takes precedence as shown below.

- Preceded by the South Africa Medal (1853).
- Succeeded by the Cape of Good Hope General Service Medal.
