= China War Medal =

There were three medals issued by the British Government during the 19th and 20th Centuries for service in a series of wars in China fought by British and Imperial troops between 5 July 1840 and 31 December 1900. They all shared the same reverse and trophy of arms, with a similar ribbon, 39mm crimson with deep yellow edges.

- The China War Medal (1842) was issued for service during the First Opium War
- The China War Medal (1861) was issued for service in the Second Opium War
- The China War Medal (1900) was issued for service in the Boxer Rebellion
