= Nicholas Tomlinson =

British military officer (1803–1842)

Nicholas Ralph Tomlinson
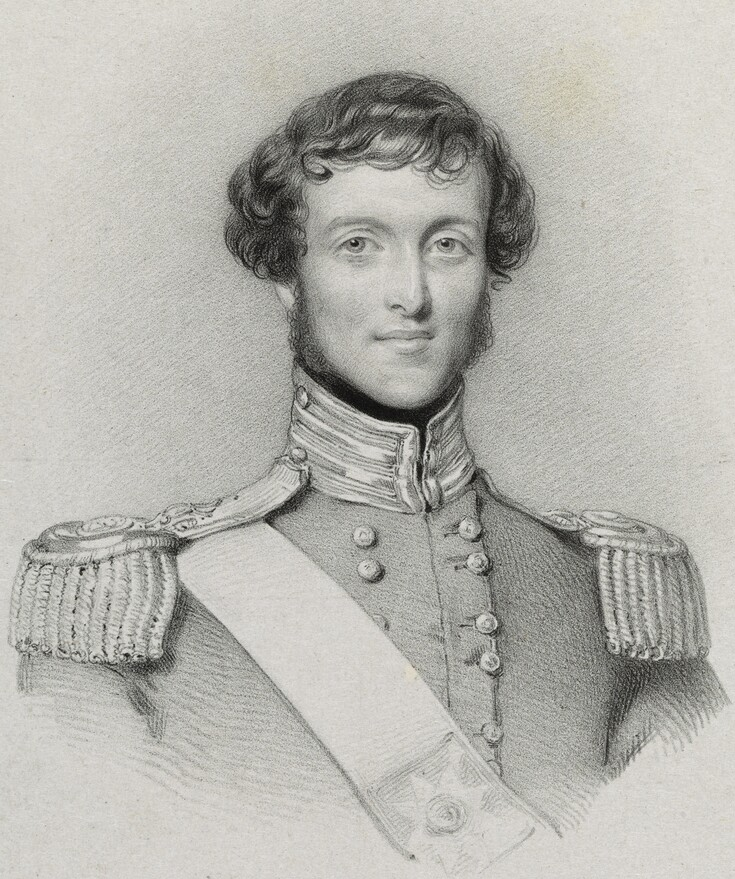
- Lithograph of Tomlinson
- Born: 2 July 1803; Dedham, Colchester, Essex
- Died: 18 May 1842 (aged 38); Battle of Chapu, China
- Burial place: At sea
- Relatives: Father Nicholas Tomlinson was a senior Royal Navy Officer
- Military career
- Allegiance: United Kingdom British East India Company
- Branch: British Army/Infantry
- Rank: Lieutenant colonel
- Unit: 18th (Royal Irish) Regiment of Foot
- Commands: 18th (Royal Irish) Regiment of Foot
- Conflicts: Capture of Chusan, Battle of Canton, Battle of Amoy, Second Capture of Chusan, Battle of Ningpo, Battle of Tzeki and finally the Battle of Chapu all in the First Opium War with the Chinese
- Awards: China War Medal (1842)

Nicholas Ralph Tomlinson (1803–1842) was a British Army infantry officer who commanded Her Majesty's 18th (Royal Irish) Regiment of Foot during the First Anglo-Chinese War (First Opium War). He was the second son of Vice Admiral Nicholas Tomlinson and his wife Elizabeth who lived in the county of Essex.

Nicholas Ralph Tomlinson's military career was recorded in Hart's Military Directory and other military gazettes as follows:

- Commissioned as an ensign in 18th Regiment of Foot – 22 March 1821
- Promoted to lieutenant – 21 July 1825
- Promoted to captain – 8 February 1833
- Promoted to major – 13 March 1840
- Promoted to lieutenant colonel – 23 November 1841.

Nicholas Tomlinson deployed with his regiment as part of Lieutenant General Sir Hugh Gough's force to subdue the Imperial Qing Chinese Forces resisting East India Company trading access to coastal China. The Chinese forces were numerous but often poorly equipped.

He would fight with distinction at the following engagements:

- Capture of Chusan in July 1840
- Battle of Canton in May 1841
- Battle of Amoy in August 1841
- Second Capture of Chusan in October 1841
- Battle of Ningpo in March 1842
- Battle of Tzeki in March 1842.

Lieutenant Colonel Tomlinson was killed leading his regiment at the Battle of Chapu on 2 May 1842, specifically an attack on a fortified religious building (called a Joss House by the British), which was heavily defended by Tartar soldiers. Sir Hugh Gough wrote effusively about the bravery of Nicholas Tomlinson and that he was buried at sea. His death and the death of others of his regiment is commemorated with a memorial in St Patrick's Cathedral Dublin. The 18th of foot would lose their commanding officer, a serjeant and three soldiers killed; and a further two officers, a serjeant, a drummer and 27 soldiers wounded - the 18th had the highest casualties of any of the regiments in action that day at Chapu.

== Gallery ==
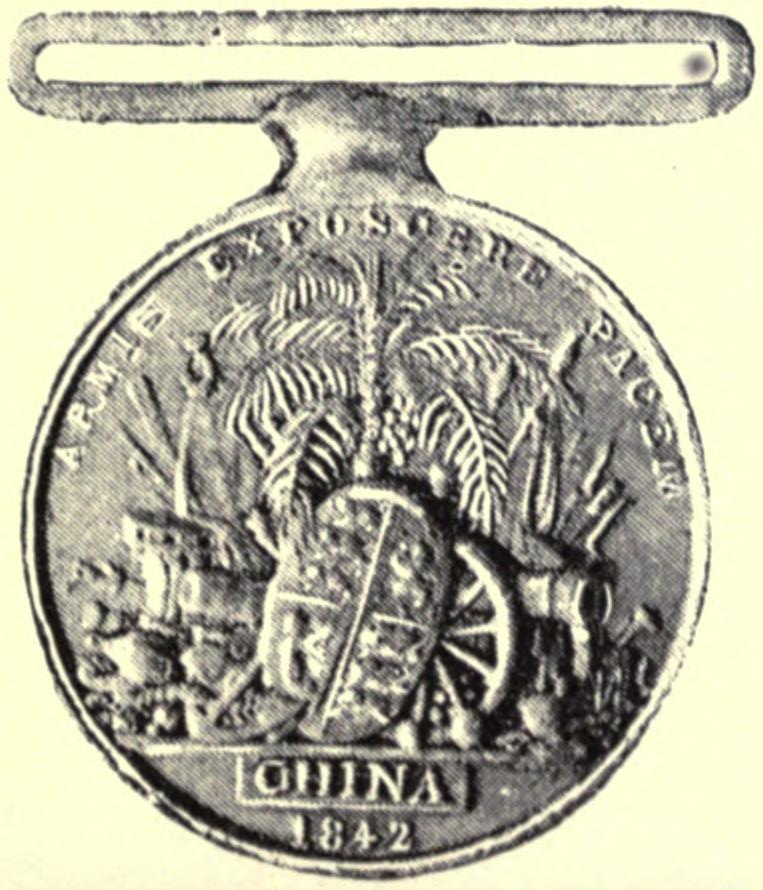
The 1842 China Medal (reverse side)

The 18th (Royal Irish) Regiment of Foot at the storming of the forts of Amoy, 26 August 1841

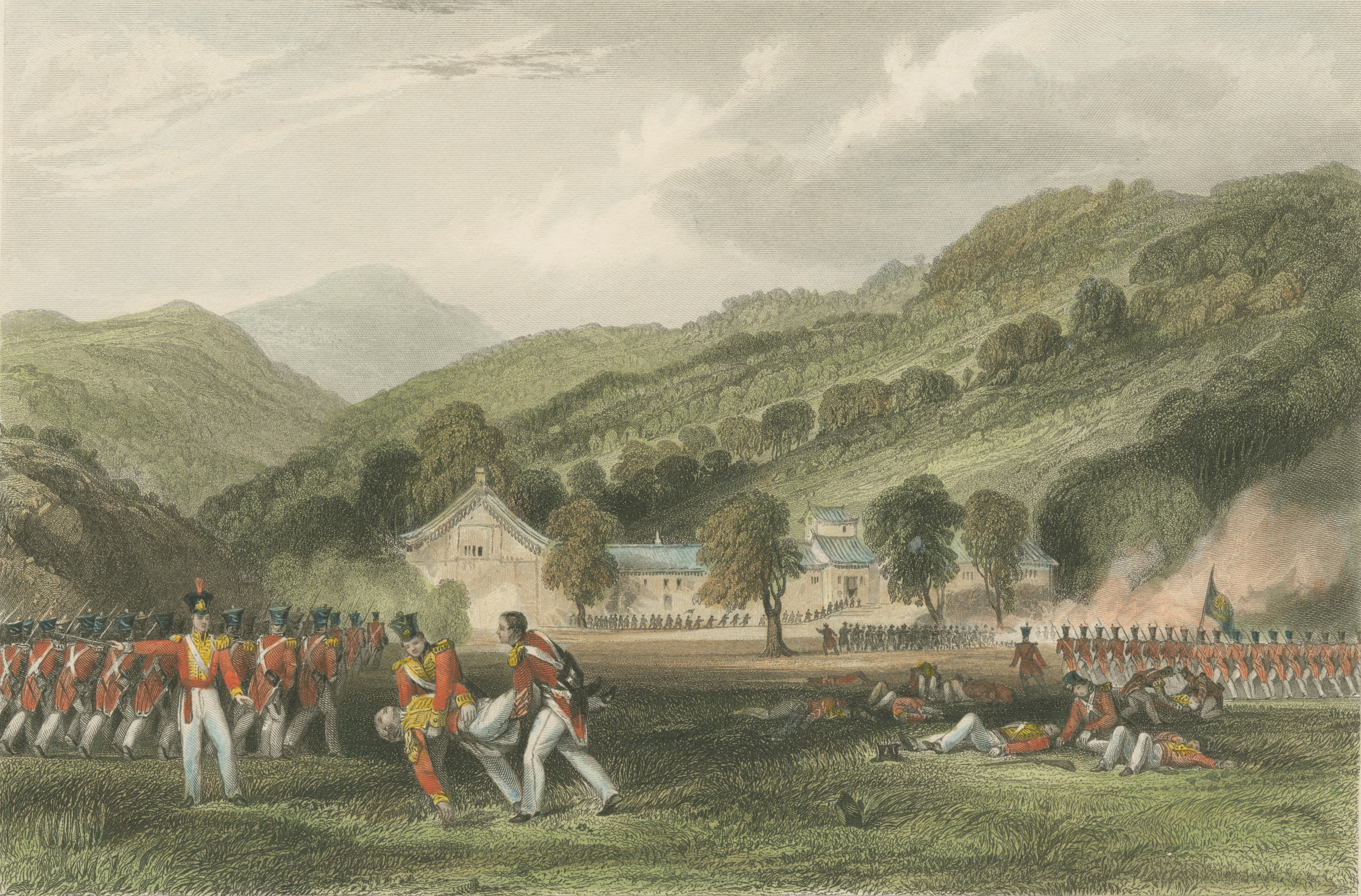
The attack on the 'Joss House' at Chapoo and the death of Lt Col Nicholas Tomlinson

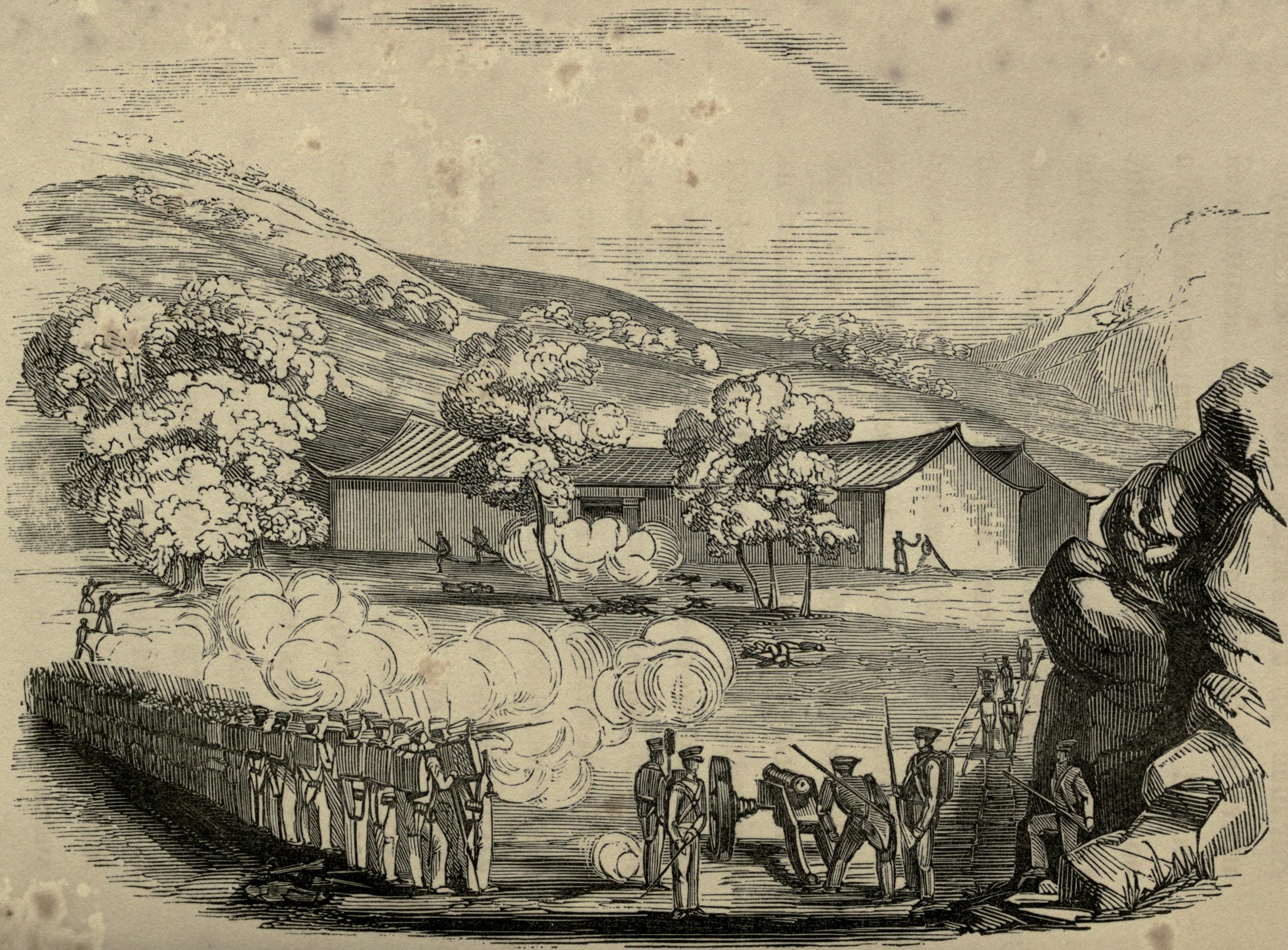
A depiction of the British Forces attack on the 'Joss House' at Chapu

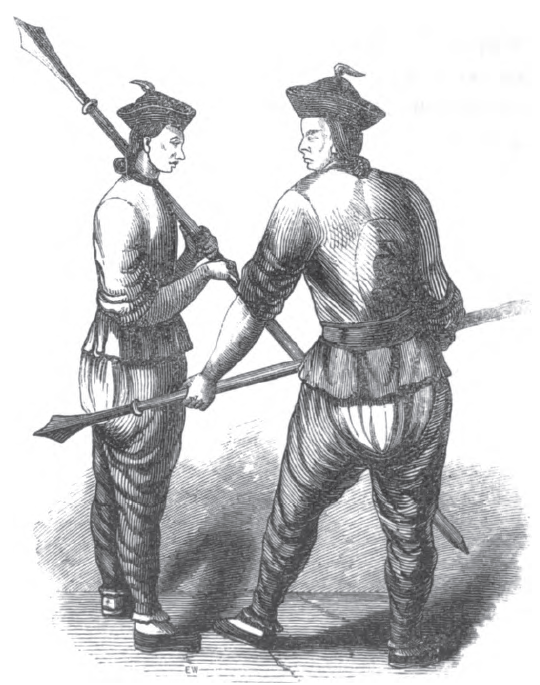
Tartar Spearmen - elite forces in the Chinese Army

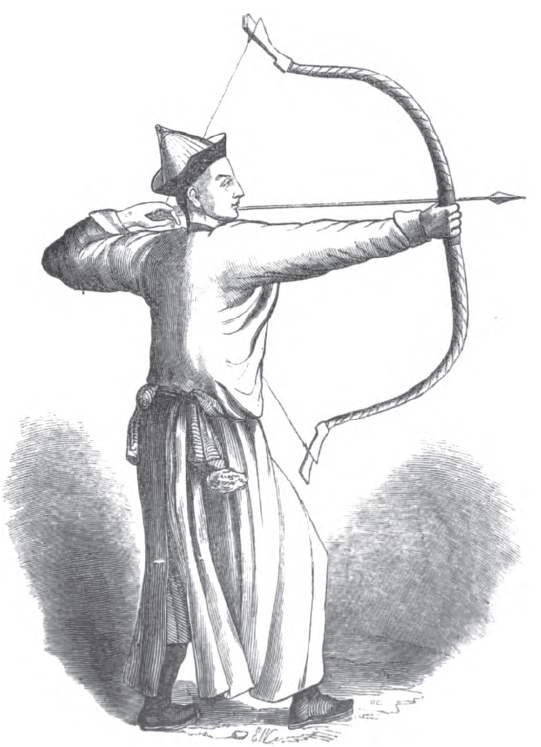
Tartar Bowmen - elite forces in the Chinese Army
