= China War Medal (1900) =

China War Medal 1900
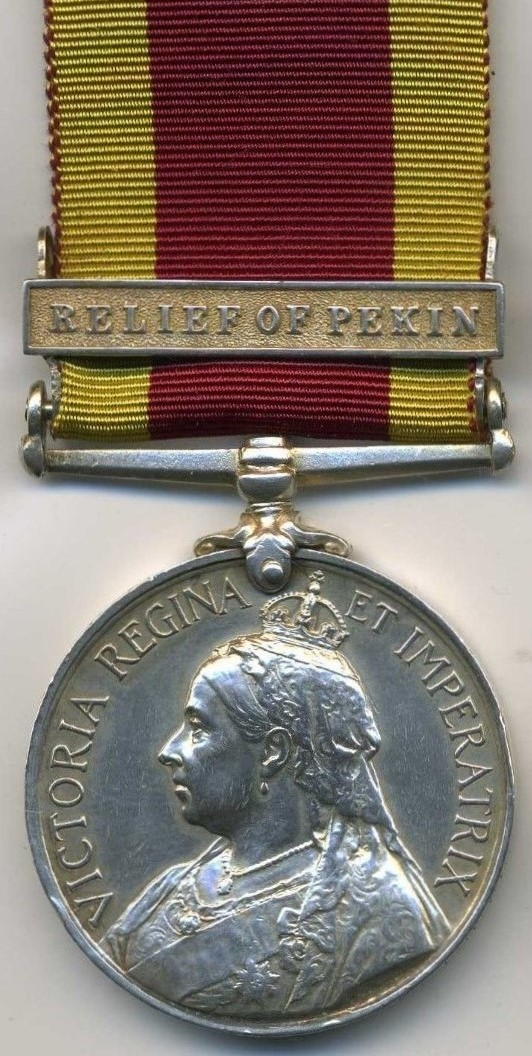
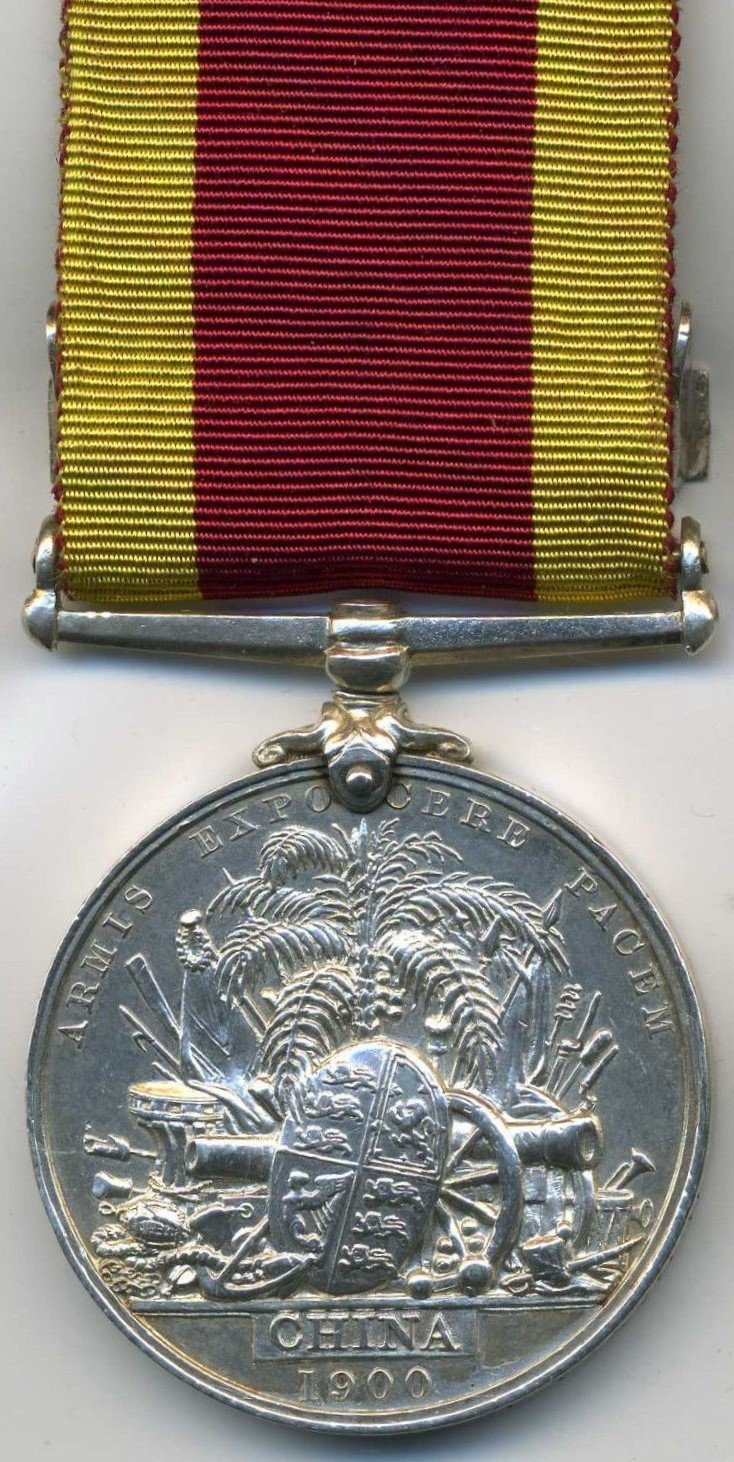
- Obverse and reverse of the medal.
- Type: Campaign medal
- Awarded for: Campaign service.
- Description: Silver disk, 36mm diameter.
- Presented by: United Kingdom of Great Britain and Ireland
- Eligibility: British and Imperial forces.
- Campaign(s): Boxer Rebellion 1900.
- Clasps: Taku Forts; Defence of Legations; Relief of Pekin
- Established: 1 January 1902
- Ribbon bar

The China War Medal 1900 was a British campaign medal approved on 1 January 1902 for issue to British and Indian land and sea troops who served during the Boxer Rebellion, between 10 June and 31 December 1900. The medal was issued in silver to combatants and in bronze to native, namely Indian, bearers drivers and servants.

== Description ==
The obverse shows a crowned and veiled effigy of Queen Victoria, facing left, with the legend "VICTORIA REGINA ET IMPERATRIX" around the upper perimeter.
The reverse shows the same shield bearing the Royal Arms, with a palm tree and trophy of arms behind and the inscription ‘ARMIS EXPOSCERE PACIM’ above, as found on the First and Second China War Medals. ‘CHINA 1900’ appears in the exergue below.

The design was similar to the China War Medal given for the campaigns in 1842 and 1850s, with the reverse identical except the year, and the effigy of Queen Victoria on the obverse changed from the original by William Wyon, to one showing an older Queen, created by George William de Saulles for the Queen's South Africa Medal, and the word et Imperatrix added.

The recipient's name and details were either impressed or engraved on the edge of the medal.

The 1.25 inches (32 mm) ribbon is crimson with wide yellow edges.

== Clasps ==
It could be issued without a clasp, or with one or more of the following clasps:

- Taku Forts

Awarded to Royal Naval personnel of the British contingent of the international fleet involved in the attack of the Taku Forts along the Hai River on 17 June 1900.

- Defence of Legations

A total of 132 were awarded, to Royal Marines, the British Legation Guard drawn from several regiments and to civilian volunteers, who aided the defence of the Legation Quarter in Beijing for 55 days between 20 June and 14 August 1900.

- Relief of Pekin

Awarded to British and Indian army personnel and to men of the Royal Navy involved in the relief of the Legations in Peking between 10 June and 14 August 1900, as part of the international relief force (see Gaselee Expedition) or as part of Vice-Admiral Edward Seymour's Naval Brigade (see Seymour Expedition).

The medal was awarded to 555 naval personnel of the Colonial navies of Australia without a clasp: 256 men with the New South Wales Contingent, 197 with the Victorian, and 102 on the South Australian gunboat Protector.
