= China War Medal (1842) =

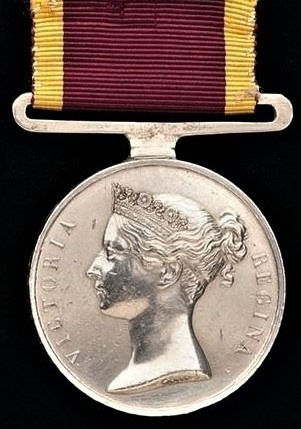
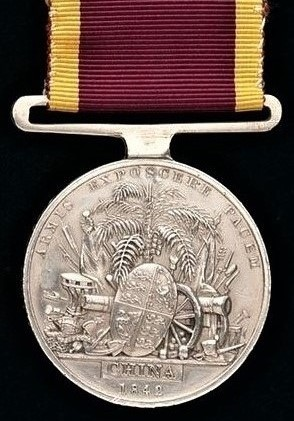
- Obverse and reverse of the medal.
- Type: Campaign medal
- Awarded for: Campaign service
- Description: Silver disk, 36mm diameter.
- Presented by: the United Kingdom
- Eligibility: British forces
- Campaign(s): First Anglo-Chinese War (1839–42)
- Clasps: None
- Established: 5 January 1843
- Ribbon. 35mm: crimson with yellow edges

The China War Medal was issued by the British Government in 1843 to members of the British and Indian forces who took part in the First Opium War (1839–42). The medal was designed by William Wyon.

== Recipients ==
The China War Medal was originally intended by the Governor-General of India, in October 1842, to be awarded exclusively to all ranks of the Honourable East India Company's Forces. Instead, in 1843, under the direction of Queen Victoria, the British Government authorised its award to all members of the British Army, Royal Navy and the Indian Army and Navy, who had belonged to units that had "served with distinction" in China between 5 July 1840 and 29 August 1842. The award covered the following actions:

- Canton River operations of 1841 (First and Second Battle of Canton).
- First and second capture of Chusan, in 1840 and 1841.
- Battles of Amoy, Ningpo, Chinhai, Tzeki, Chapu, Woosung, in the Yangtze River, and the assault of Chinkiang.

This campaign became known as the First Opium War, ending in the seizure of Nanking. The resultant treaty opened five ports to trade, and ceded Hong Kong to Great Britain.

== Description ==
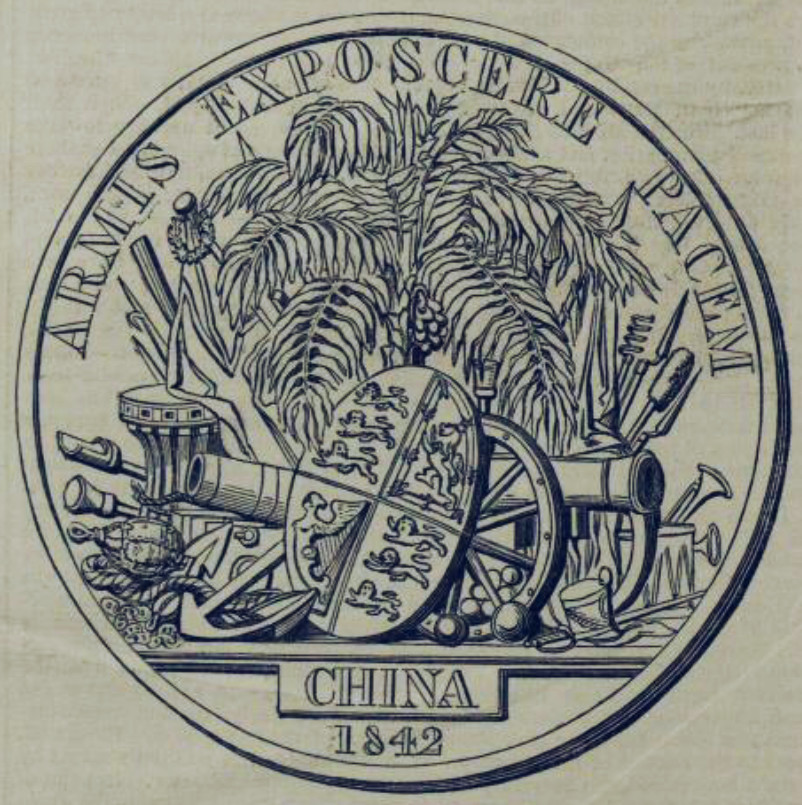
The medal as depicted in The Illustrated London News, 14 February 1846

Obverse: the diademed head of Queen Victoria with the legend "VICTORIA REGINA".
Reverse: a shield bearing the Royal coat of arms with a palm tree and trophy of arms behind, with the inscription "ARMIS EXPOSCERE PACIM" above and "CHINA 1842" in the exergue below.

This reverse design was also used for the Second and Third China War Medals.

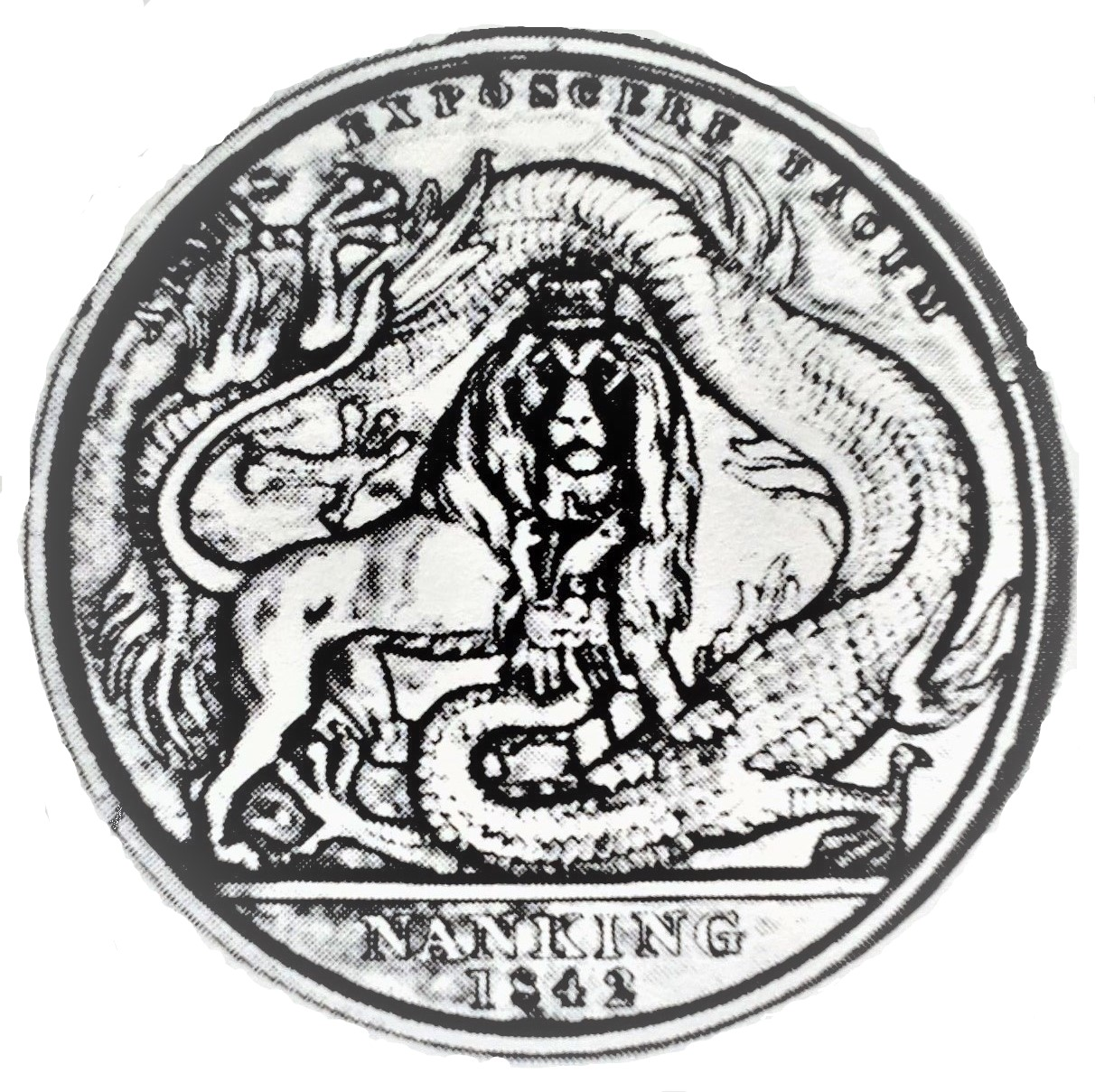
Original reverse design

The First China War Medal's reverse was originally designed depicting the British lion trampling on the fallen Chinese dragon. However, this was considered too insensitive to the Chinese and so the reverse described above was used, although a number of specimens of the first type were made.

The non-swiveling suspender is plain and straight being sweated directly to the medal.

The 35 millimetres (1.4 in) wide ribbon is crimson with wide yellow edges, the crimson representing the heraldic colour of Great Britain, and the yellow the imperial colour of China.

No clasps were authorised for this medal.

The medals were named in bold block capital letters with stars used to fill in the spaces as on the Waterloo Medal. However, since new punches were used for this medal the naming appears somewhat sharper than on Waterloo Medal examples.

Recipients of this medal who also qualified for the Second China War Medal in 1861 received a clasp inscribed China 1842 to add to their existing medal, in addition to any clasps relating to the second war to which they were entitled. Although these clasps were intended to be fixed to the earlier medal, the different width and style of the two suspenders meant that it was not clear how this was to be done. As a result, the clasps were often simply slipped over the ribbon which was sometimes replaced with the narrower 32mm type supplied with the second medal. Other recipients of the earlier medal replaced the original suspender with one similar to that found on the second medal.
