= Pinghu =

Pinghu 平湖市
- County-level city
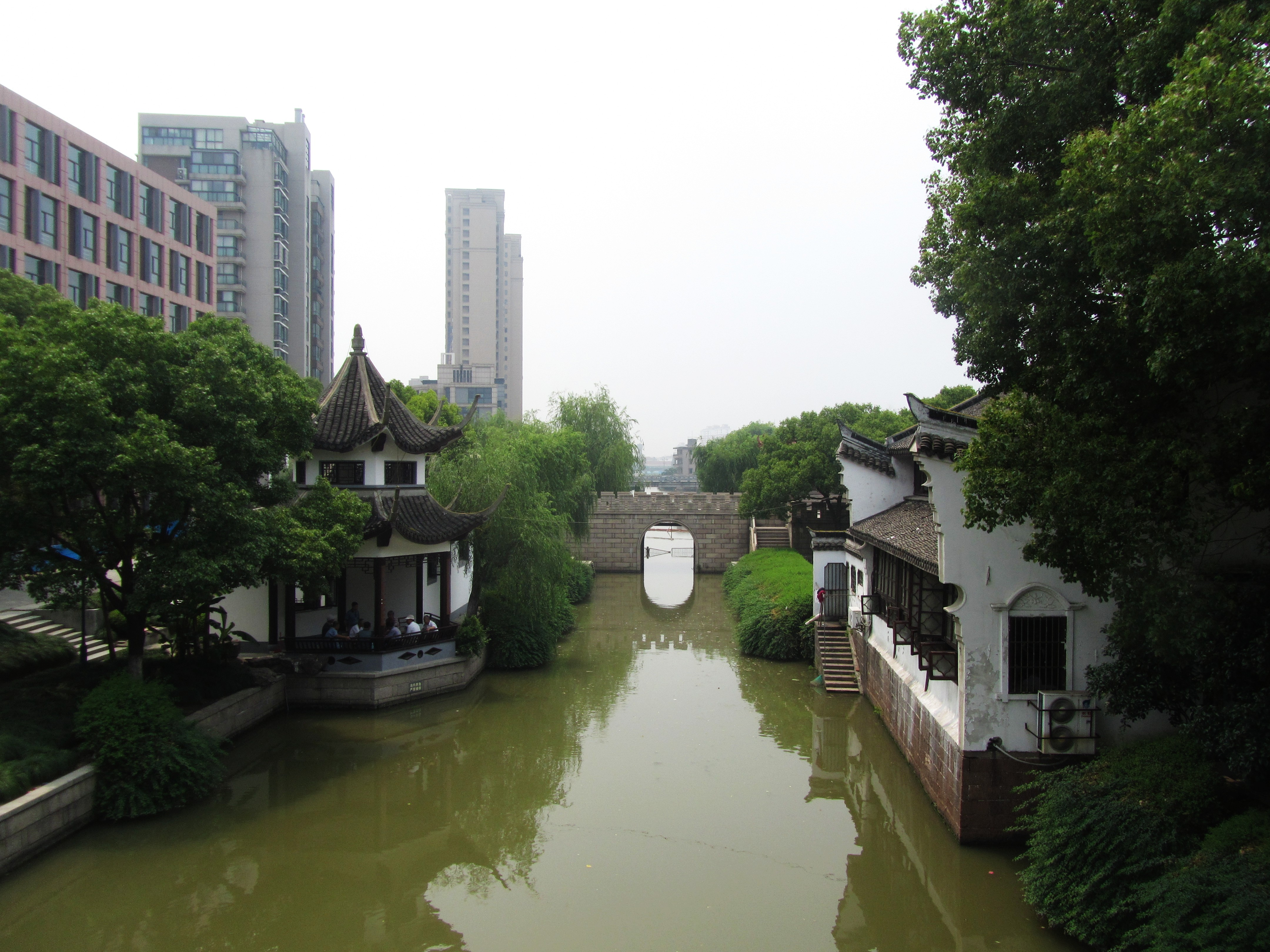

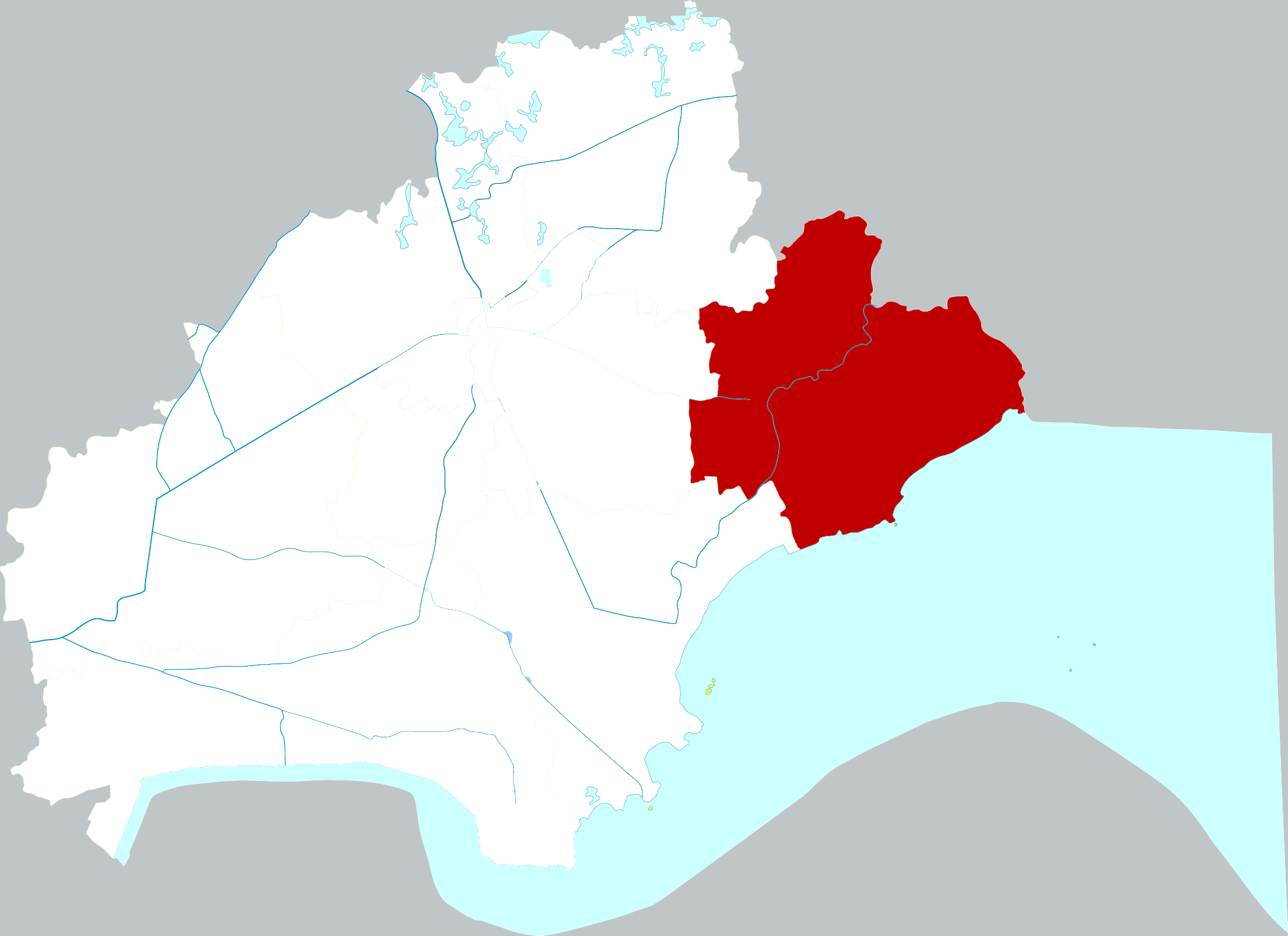
- Location of Pinghu City within Jiaxing

- Location in Zhejiang
- Coordinates: 30°42′N 121°01′E
- Country: People's Republic of China
- Province: Zhejiang
- Prefecture-level city: Jiaxing

Area
  - Total: 536 km^{2} (207 sq mi)

Population (2019)
  - Total: 703,500
- Time zone: UTC+8 (China Standard)
- Postal code: 314200
- Area code: 0573

Pinghu
- Chinese: 平湖
- Literal meaning: Peaceful Lake(s); Pacified Lake(s)
Transcriptions
Standard Mandarin
- Hanyu Pinyin: Pínghú
- Wade–Giles: P‘ing-hu

Pinghu is a county-level city in the east of Jiaxing's administrative area, in the northeast of Zhejiang Province, bordering Shanghai to the northeast. It sits next to the East China Sea and the north shore of Hangzhou Bay. Prior to the Ming dynasty, Pinghu was part of Haiyan County. In 1430 Pinghu County was established. In 1991 Pinghu became a county-level city under the administration of the prefecture-level city of Jiaxing.

== History ==
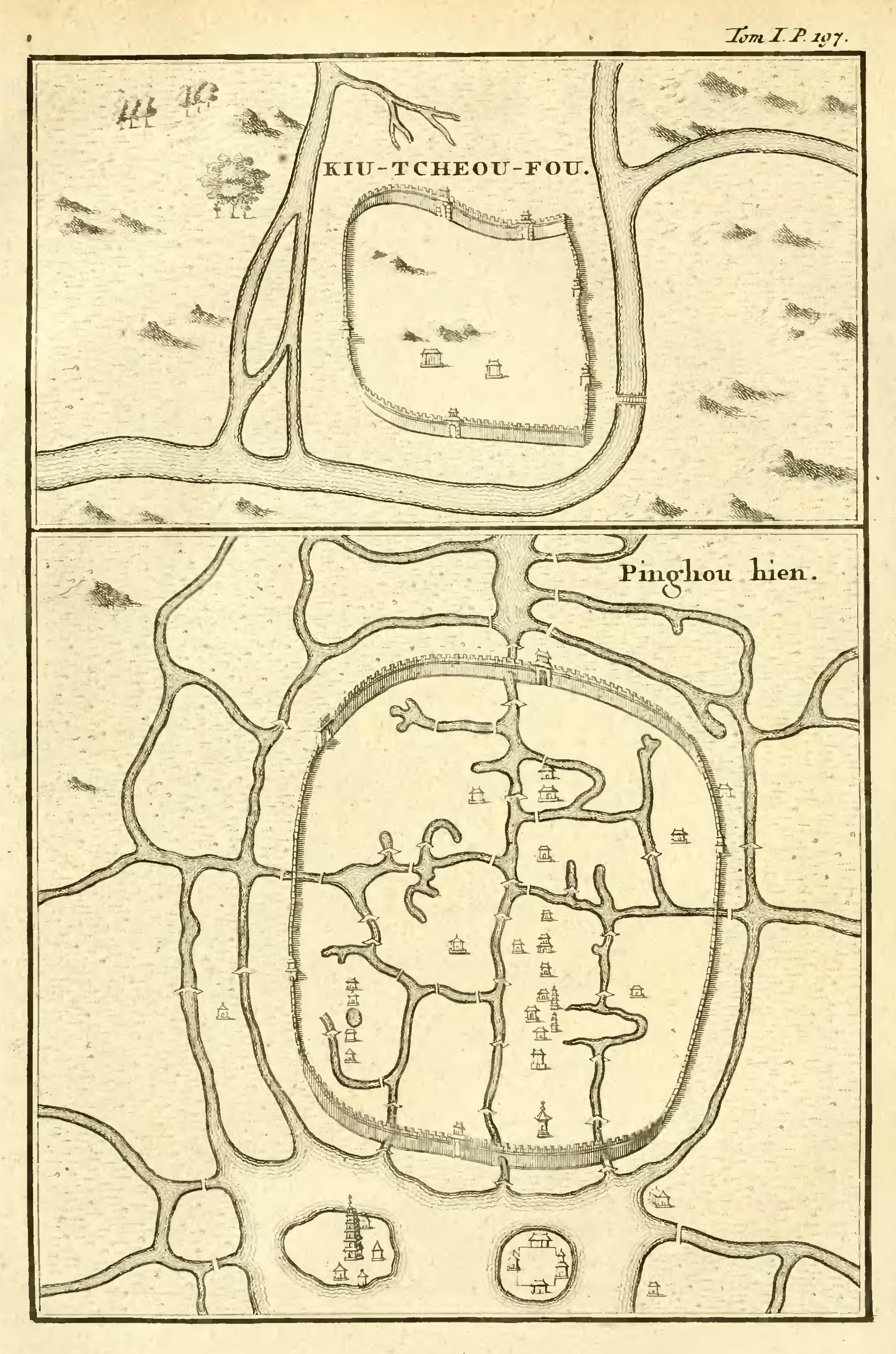
Maps of "Kiu-tcheou-fou" and "Pinghou-hien" from Du Halde's 1736 Description of China, based on Jesuit accounts

Zhapu, the site of a deepwater harbor, was the principal site of China's foreign trade with Korea and Japan during the 18th and 19th century.

== Economy ==
Pinghu dominates the Chinese down jacket industry; over half of down jackets sold in China are produced in Pinghu, and it is home to a major down jacket wholesale market. This industry started in the 1980s. An estimated 300 million garments are produced in Pinghu yearly. Huachen AI Parking which is listed on the Nasdaq stock exchange as HCAI is headquartered in Pinghu.

== Administration ==
3 neighborhoods (subdistricts), 7 towns

- neighborhood committee and offices
  - Zhongdai neighborhood
  - Danghu neighborhood
  - Caoqiao neighborhood
- towns
  - Zhapu
  - Xindai
  - Xincang
  - Huanggu
  - Quantang
  - Guangchen
  - Lindai

== Geography and climate ==
Pinghu is located on a low and flat plain and is laced with a network of rivers. A number of islands, such as Wangpan Shan are located offshore. The municipality's average yearly temperature is 15 °C (59 °F), with average precipitation of 1,186 mm (46.7 in). Agricultural production is marked by its amount of aquatic products. Important crops are rice, wheat, Chinese cabbage, prawns, and bird eggs. Specialties include pickled eggs and watermelons. Due to its proximity to Shanghai, Pinghu also attracts investment from many multinational enterprises. Industry includes clothing, packaging, machinery, paper and others. Clothing production is especially high, with the value of Pinghu's total clothing exports the greatest in China. It has been placed as one of China's one hundred most productive areas.

Zhapu harbor in the municipality's southwest is an important deep water harbor along Hangzhou Bay. A port has been located here since the Tang dynasty, and it is still an important transshipment point. Next to the harbor is one of China's most important large thermal power plants, Jiaxing Powerplant, with a capacity of 3,000,000 kilowatts.

In modern China many famous monks, educators and artists (music, calligraphy, painting, seals, poetry) have come from Pinghu. The city's downtown contains a large memorial to Li Shutong and a number of other attractions and scenic spots.

Climate data for Pinghu, elevation 4 m (13 ft), (1991–2020 normals, extremes 1981–present)
Month	Jan	Feb	Mar	Apr	May	Jun	Jul	Aug	Sep	Oct	Nov	Dec	Year
Record high °C (°F)	21.4 (70.5)	26.9 (80.4)	30.0 (86.0)	31.4 (88.5)	33.4 (92.1)	36.3 (97.3)	38.7 (101.7)	38.5 (101.3)	36.7 (98.1)	33.3 (91.9)	27.8 (82.0)	23.6 (74.5)	38.7 (101.7)
Mean daily maximum °C (°F)	8.3 (46.9)	10.1 (50.2)	14.0 (57.2)	19.4 (66.9)	24.3 (75.7)	27.3 (81.1)	32.0 (89.6)	31.7 (89.1)	27.9 (82.2)	23.0 (73.4)	17.4 (63.3)	11.2 (52.2)	20.5 (69.0)
Daily mean °C (°F)	4.5 (40.1)	6.3 (43.3)	10.0 (50.0)	15.3 (59.5)	20.5 (68.9)	24.1 (75.4)	28.6 (83.5)	28.4 (83.1)	24.2 (75.6)	18.8 (65.8)	13.2 (55.8)	6.9 (44.4)	16.7 (62.1)
Mean daily minimum °C (°F)	1.4 (34.5)	3.1 (37.6)	6.7 (44.1)	11.8 (53.2)	17.3 (63.1)	21.6 (70.9)	25.9 (78.6)	25.8 (78.4)	21.1 (70.0)	15.0 (59.0)	9.3 (48.7)	3.3 (37.9)	13.5 (56.3)
Record low °C (°F)	−8.4 (16.9)	−7.0 (19.4)	−4.1 (24.6)	−1.0 (30.2)	6.3 (43.3)	12.2 (54.0)	18.4 (65.1)	17.2 (63.0)	10.2 (50.4)	1.2 (34.2)	−3.1 (26.4)	−9.3 (15.3)	−9.3 (15.3)
Average precipitation mm (inches)	80.2 (3.16)	76.3 (3.00)	109.8 (4.32)	91.8 (3.61)	112.6 (4.43)	228.0 (8.98)	141.2 (5.56)	202.0 (7.95)	117.3 (4.62)	65.8 (2.59)	67.2 (2.65)	57.0 (2.24)	1,349.2 (53.11)
Average precipitation days (≥ 0.1 mm)	12.1	11.4	13.9	12.7	12.3	14.9	11.6	12.7	10.7	7.6	9.8	9.1	138.8
Average snowy days	3.0	2.3	0.7	0.1	0	0	0	0	0	0	0.2	1.1	7.4
Average relative humidity (%)	79	78	78	77	78	84	80	80	81	79	79	77	79
Mean monthly sunshine hours	113.7	117.9	140.1	165.1	178.7	137.5	229.9	227.0	178.3	174.7	137.6	130.0	1,930.5
Percentage possible sunshine	35	37	38	43	42	33	54	56	49	50	44	41	44
Source: China Meteorological Administration All-time October high
