= Zhapu =

Zhapu 乍浦镇 Chapoo
- Town
- Location in Zhejiang
- Coordinates (Zhapu government): 30°36′15″N 121°05′43″E
- Country: People's Republic of China
- Province: Zhejiang
- Prefecture-level city: Jiaxing
- County-level city: Pinghu
- Time zone: UTC+8 (China Standard)

Zhapu
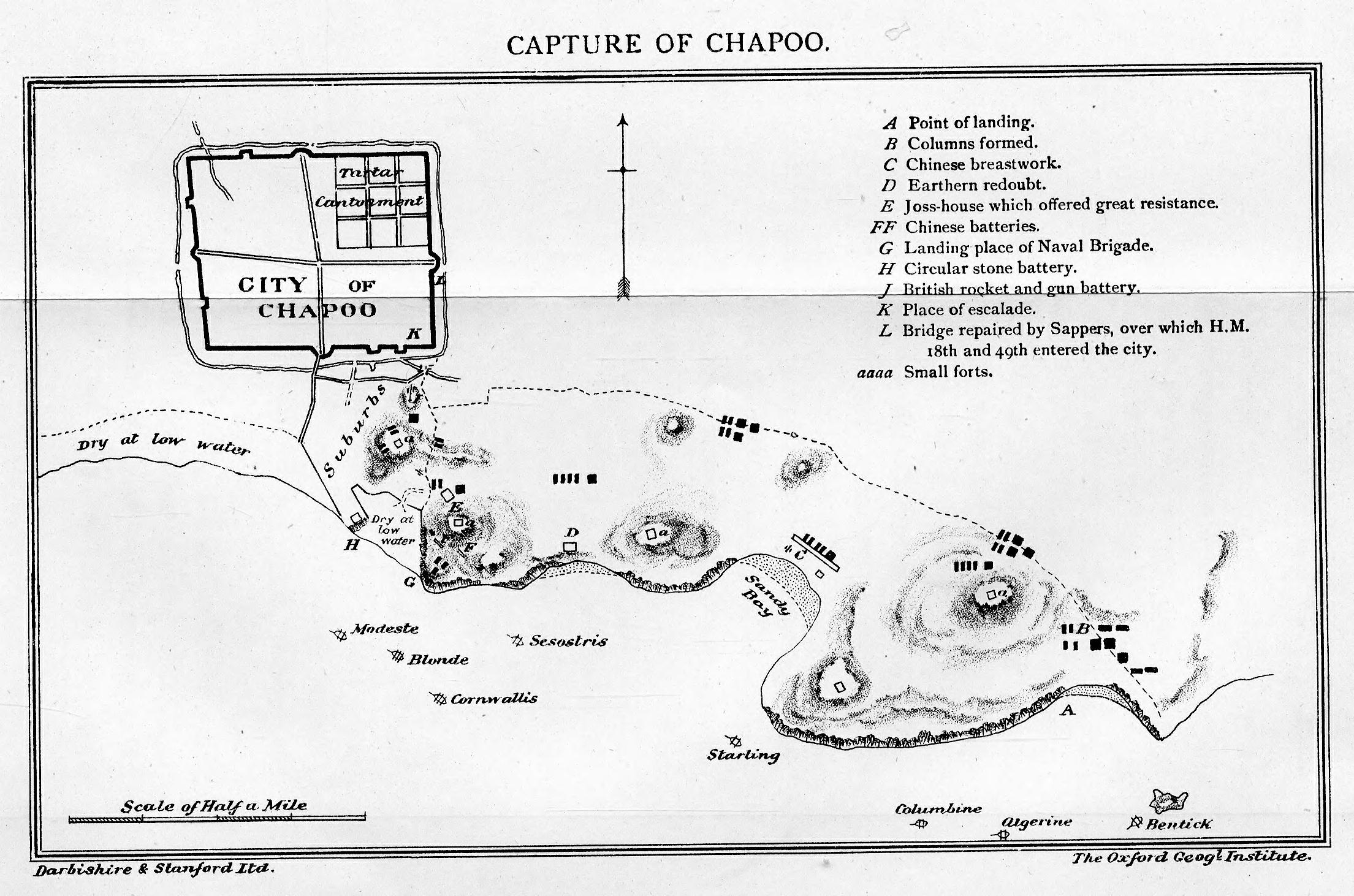
- A map of the Battle of Zhapu, showing the city's walls and harbor in the mid-19th century
- Chinese: 乍浦
- Postal: Chapoo
- Literal meaning: Sudden Bank
Transcriptions
Standard Mandarin
- Hanyu Pinyin: Zhàpǔ
- Wade–Giles: Cha-pu

Zhapu, alternately romanized as Chapoo or Chapu, is a town under the administration of Pinghu, in the north of Zhejiang Province, China. It is located along the northern shore of Hangzhou Bay in the southeastern part of Pinghu and borders Haiyan County to its south and southeast. The town covers an area of 54.4 square kilometers and has a population of 54,000.

== History ==
Zhapu is the site of a deepwater harbor on the northern shore of Hangzhou Bay, noted as a port since the Tang. Under the Qing, an extensive canal network connected it to Hangzhou and turned it into the area's principal port. Under the dynasty's restrictive trade policies, its merchants monopolized China's trade with Korea and Japan.

At the time of the First Opium War, Chapu was protected by an imperial army garrison and a city wall with a circuit of about 5 miles (8.0 km). The British captured the town on 18 May 1842 but abandoned it shortly thereafter. By that time, the harbor had begun silting up and was only accessible to the lighter-draft British vessels. It was omitted from the treaty ports at the end of the war and declined in importance relative to nearby Shanghai and Ningbo.

By the early 20th century, its harbor had effectively silted up and the town became a backwater.

== Zhapu Port ==
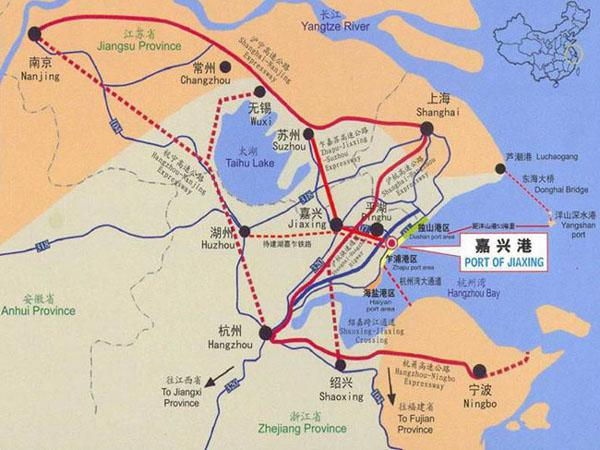
Map of Zhapu port (Port of Jiaxing)

Zhapu port, located south of the mouth of Yangtze river is a new port developed after 2000, and is a part of the port of Jiaxing. It is located in Hangzhou bay, equidistant from Ningbo, Hangzhou and Huzhou.
