= Port of Jiaxing =

Coordinates: 30°36′00″N 121°07′24″E

Port of Jiaxing (嘉兴港)
- Interactive map of Port of Jiaxing (嘉兴港)

Location
- Country: People's Republic of China
- Location: Jiaxing, Zhejiang Province

Details
- Opened: 1992
- Owned by: People's Republic of China
- Type of harbour: Natural Estuary Deep-water Seaport

Statistics
- Website; Port of Jiaxing website

The Port of Jiaxing is a natural estuary deep-water international seaport on the Hangzhou Bay coast of Jiaxing, Zhejiang, China.

== Layout ==
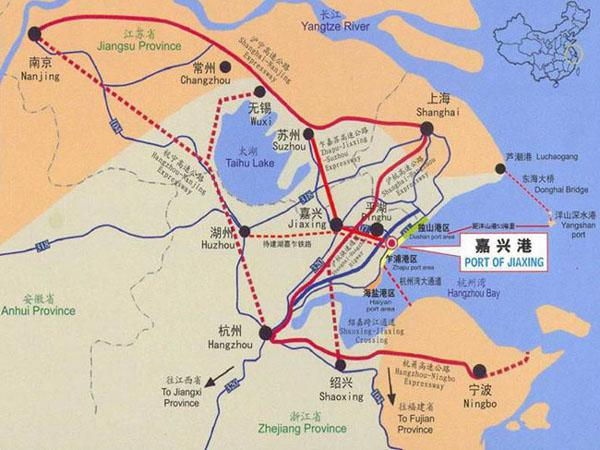
Map of Zhapu port (Port of Jiaxing)

The port of Jiaxing is located at the mouth of the Qiantang River, at the start of Hangzhou Bay. A large number of inland waterways, including the Grand Canal crisscross Jiaxing prefecture as well. As of 2012, it had 36 berths, 26 capable of handling ships over 10,000 DWT, and 10 berths for 1,000-ton vessels.

- Zhapu Port Area (乍浦港区), just to the east of the Hangzhou Bay Sea Bridge is the main port area.
- Dushan Port Area (独山港区)
- Haiyan Port Area (海盐港区)

The Jiaxing Inland Port is located in several areas alongside the many waterways of the region, and is administered independently.
