= Battle of Chapu =

Coordinates: 30°36′22″N 121°5′46″E

- Part of the First Opium War
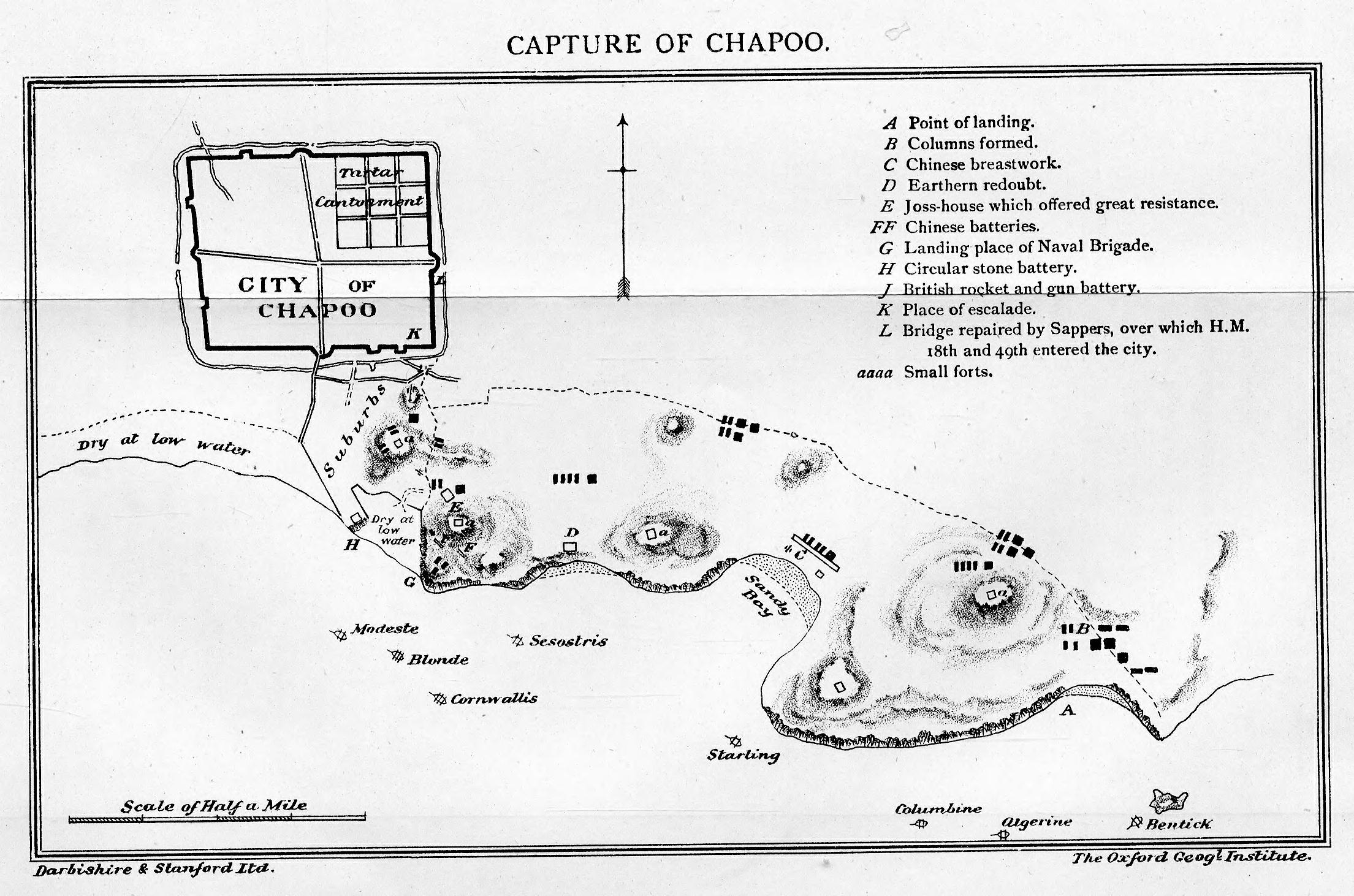
- Map of the battle of Chapu
Date	18 May 1842
Location	Zhapu, Zhejiang, China
Result	British victory

Belligerents
United Kingdom: British East India Company	Qing China

Commanders and leaders
Hugh Gough; William Parker; Nicholas Tomlinson †	Changxi

Strength
8 ships; 2,220 land troops	8,000–10,000 troops

Casualties and losses
13 killed; 42 wounded	1,200–1,500 casualties; 14 junks captured

Battle of Chapu
- Traditional Chinese: 乍浦之戰
- Simplified Chinese: 乍浦之战
Transcriptions
Standard Mandarin
- Hanyu Pinyin: Zhàpǔ zhī Zhàn

The Battle of Chapu was fought between British and Qing forces at Chapu (present-day Zhapu) on the northern shore of Hangzhou Bay during the First Opium War.

== Battle ==
Before the attack, the British commander, Major General Hugh Gough divided his forces into three: a column of infantry on the left (863 men) and right (969 men), with artillery in the centre. Gough accompanied the right column, which landed first on May 16. The remaining troops moved round to the rear of the enemy thereby cutting their communications with Zhapu. Meanwhile, the accompanying steamers began a bombardment of the city's defences. In Gough's own words: "The enemy were completely taken by surprise; as usual, they were unprepared for anything except a frontal attack. They gave way on all sides and took to flight, with the exception of a body of some 300 Tartar troops who seized a small joss-house, and held it with indomitable pluck and perseverance."

Multiple assaults proved necessary to capture the joss-house with casualties suffered on both sides; eventually it fell and after each of the gates had been captured, the city fell to the British. Not without cost — as Gough lost one of his most accomplished field commanders, Lieutenant Colonel Nicholas Tomlinson, who was killed personally leading a breaching party of the 18th (Royal Irish) Regiment of Foot.

== Aftermath ==
The British did not remain in Zhapu long. They captured the city's ordnance and destroyed its arsenals before moving on to attack Wusong.

Hailing, the Manchu commander at Zhenjiang, received the report of Zhapu's surrender on June 18. The Manchus committed mass suicide while the Han Chinese discussed the situation with the British. When hostilities ceased, Chinese official Yilibu returned sixteen kidnapped British soldiers to Gough in "recognition of his courtesy in releasing the Chinese captured at Chapoo".

== Gallery ==
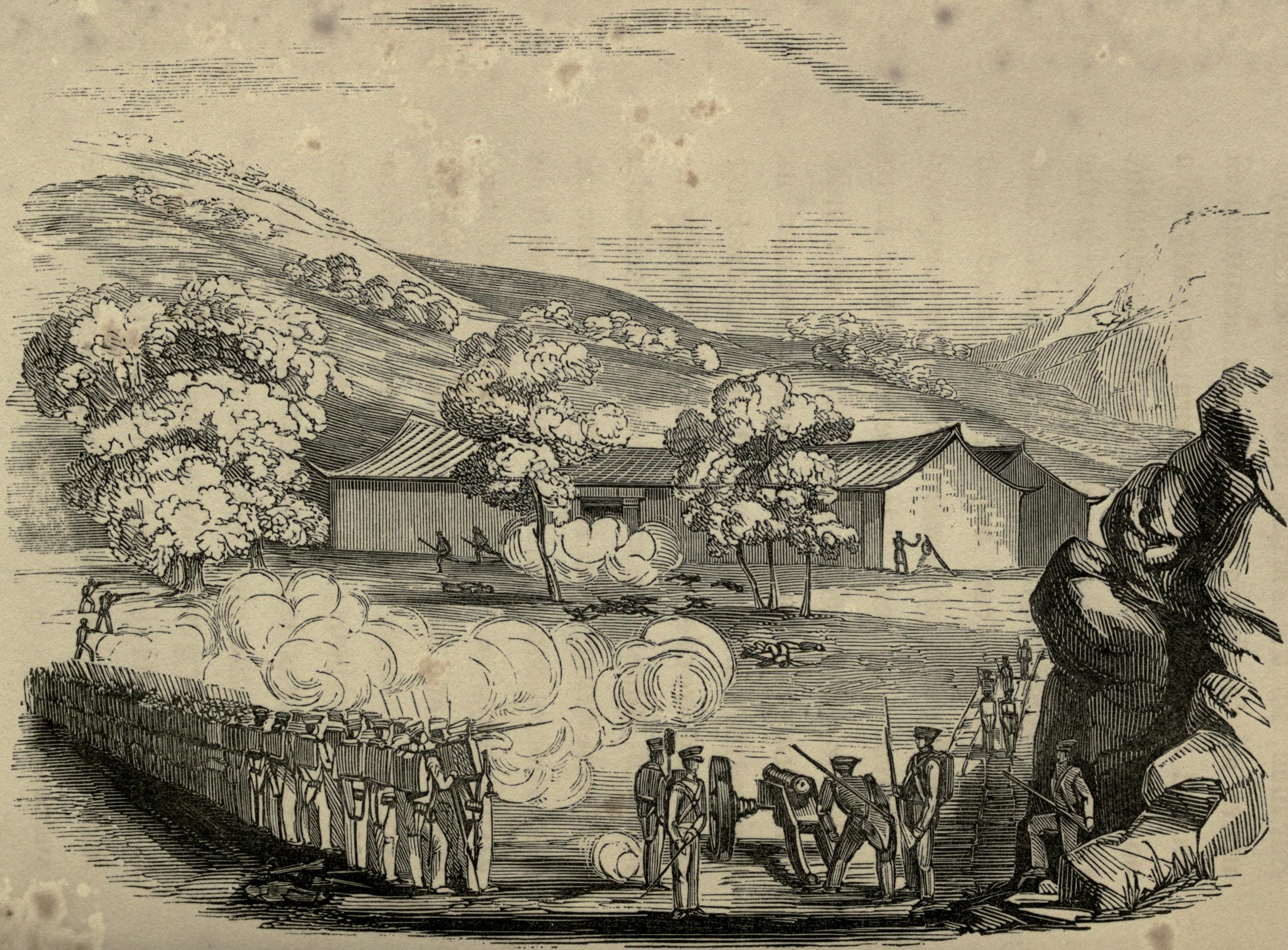
Engagement at the joss house

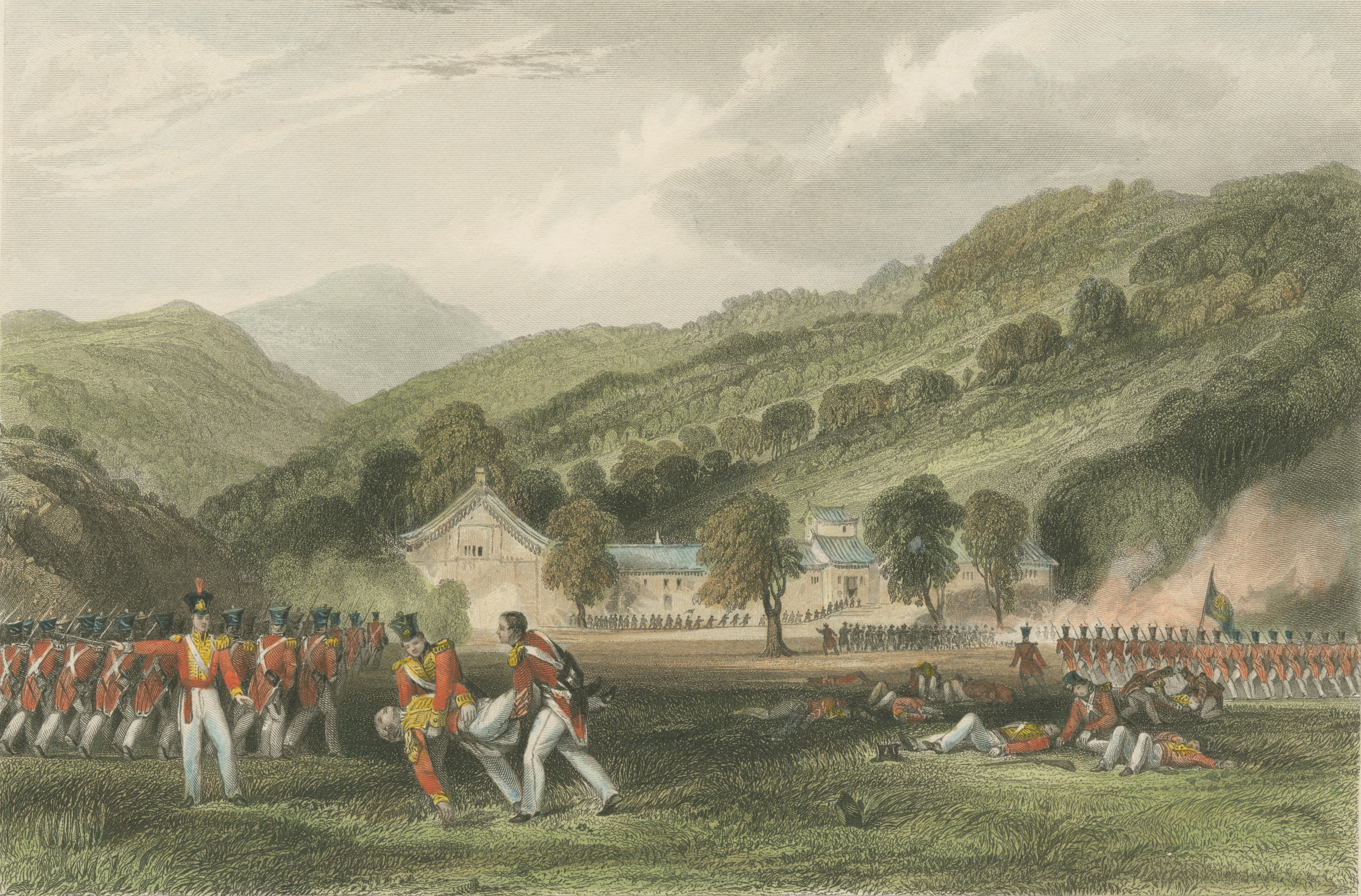
Joss House, Chapoo. Death of Col. Tomlinson

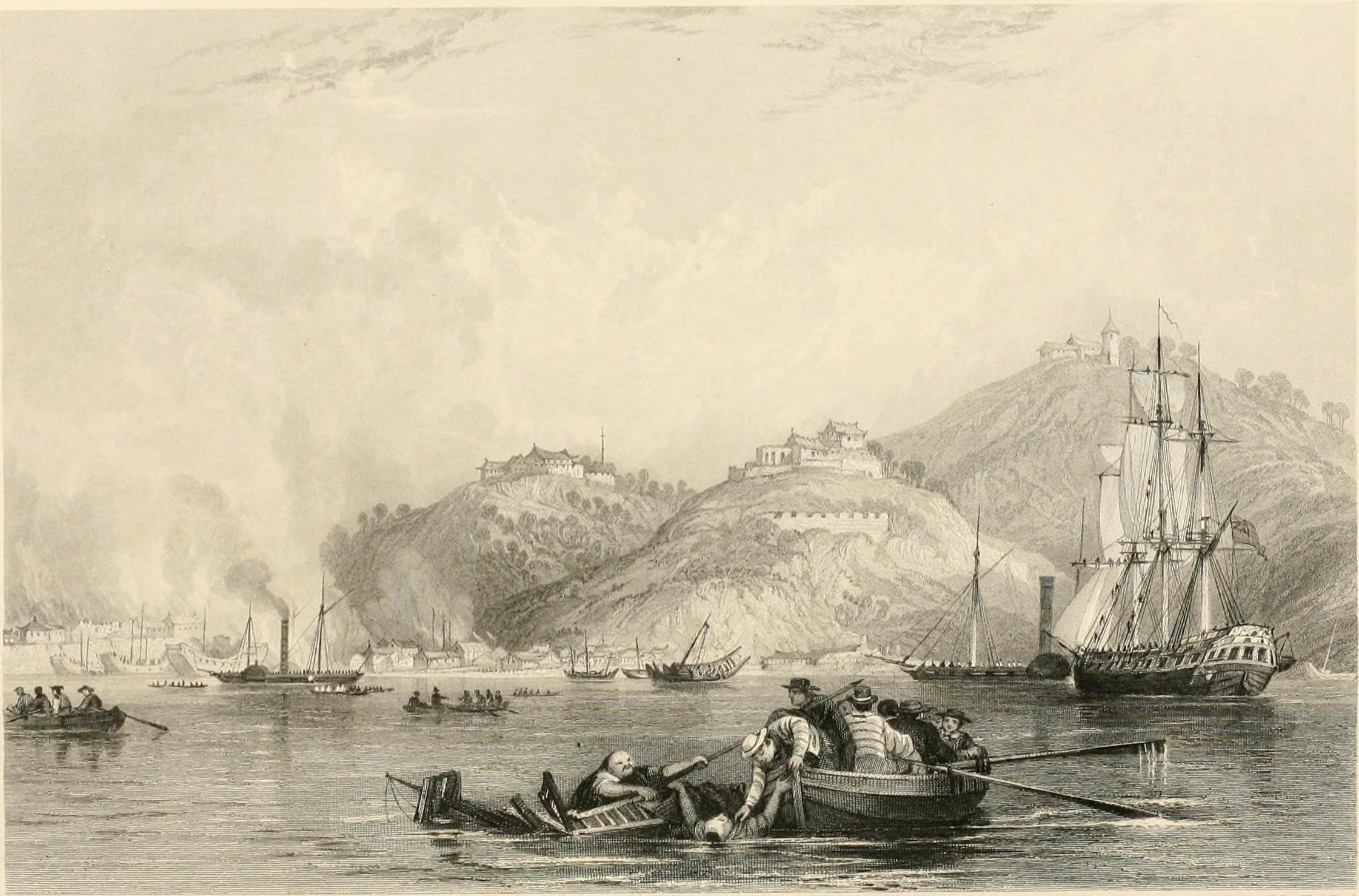
Close of the attack on Chapu
