= Battle of Tzeki =

- Part of the First Opium War
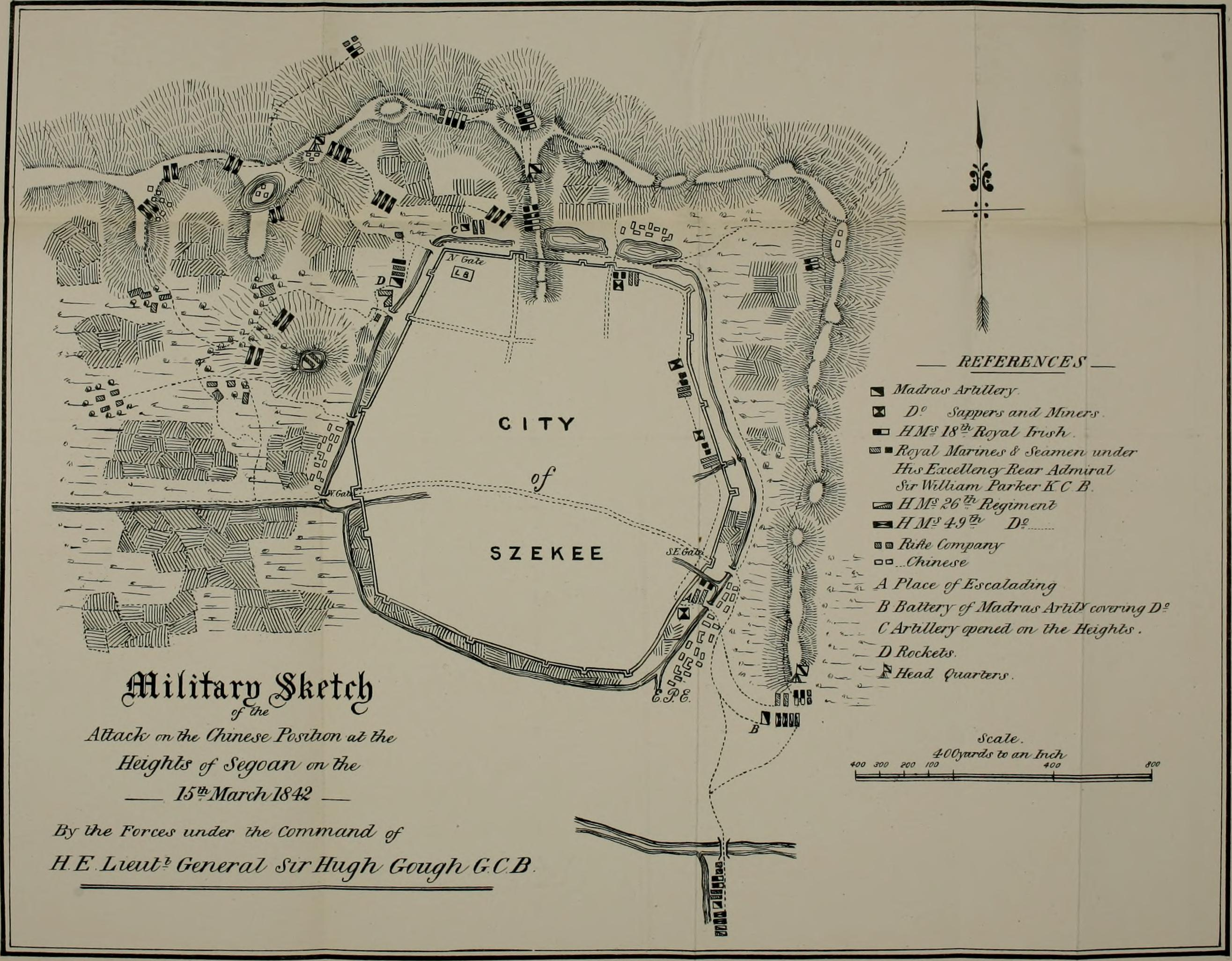
- Map of the operations in Tzeki
| Date | 15 March 1842 |
| Location | Cixi, Zhejiang, China |
| Result | British victory |

Belligerents
| United Kingdom: British East India Company | Qing China |

Commanders and leaders
| Hugh Gough, William Parker | General Yu Pu-yun |

Strength
| 1,260 | 8,000 Bannermen |

Casualties and losses
| 3 killed 22 wounded | 1,000+ killed |

The Battle of Tzeki, Cixi, or Tsz'kí was fought between British and Chinese forces in Tzeki (Cixi), Zhejiang province, China on 15 March 1842 during the First Opium War.
