= Second China War Medal =

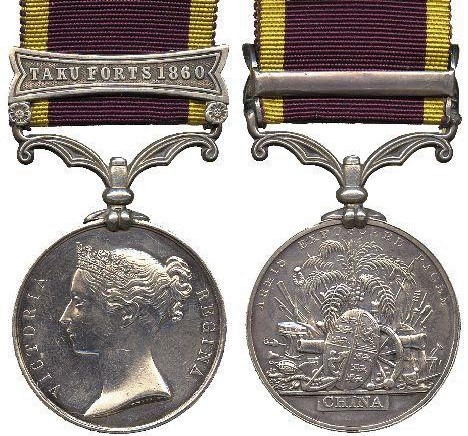
- Obverse and reverse of medal.
- Type: Campaign medal
- Awarded for: Campaign service.
- Description: Silver disk, 36mm diameter.
- Presented by: United Kingdom of Great Britain and Ireland
- Eligibility: British forces.
- Campaign: Second Opium War 1857-60
- Clasps: China 1842; Fatshan 1857; Canton 1857; Taku Forts 1858; Taku Forts 1860; Pekin 1860
- Established: 6 March 1861
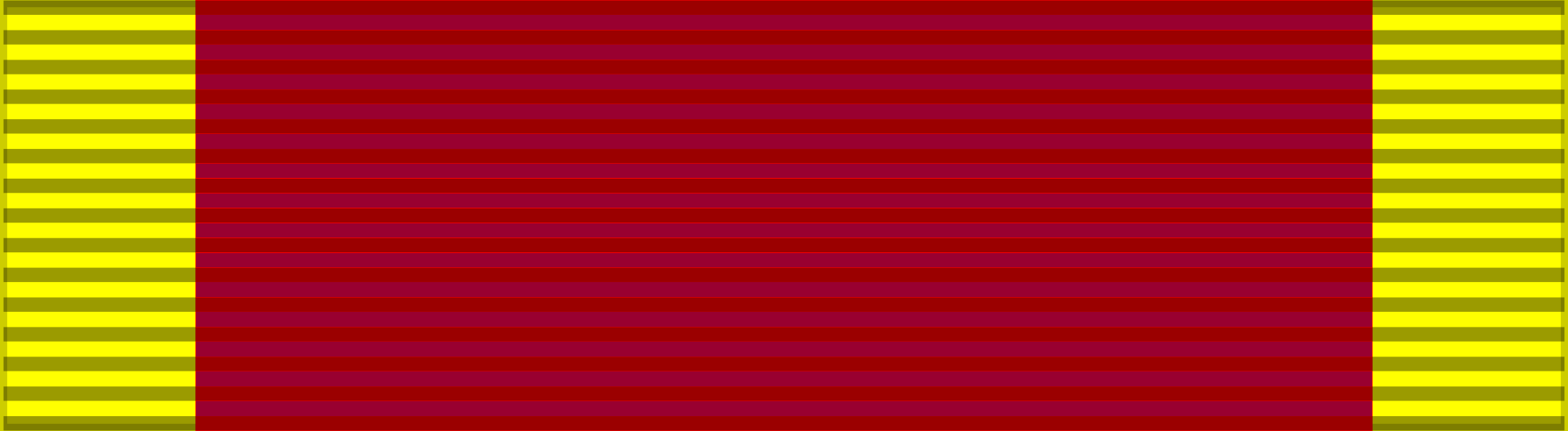
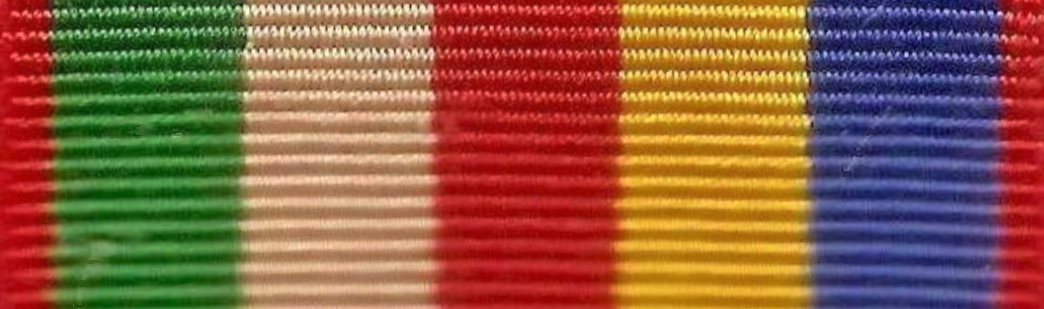
- Ribbon: 32mm crimson ribbon with yellow edges Proposed ribbon, not finally adopted

The Second China War Medal was issued by the British Government in 1861 to members of the British and Indian armies and Royal Navy who took part in the Second Opium War of 1857 to 1860 against China. The medal was designed by William Wyon.

The medal's obverse shows the diademed head of Queen Victoria with the legend ‘VICTORIA REGINA’. The reverse has the same shield bearing the Royal Arms, with a palm tree and trophy of arms behind, as found on the First China War Medal with the inscription ‘ARMIS EXPOSCERE PACIM’ above and the word ‘CHINA’ in the exergue below. The suspender is the same as that used on the Indian Mutiny Medal.

The medal was issued with the following clasps:

- China 1842 (awarded to those who had already received the medal for the First China War)
- Fatshan 1857
- Canton 1857
- Taku Forts 1858
- Taku Forts 1860
- Pekin 1860

The medal could also be awarded without a clasp.

The 32 mm ribbon is crimson with yellow edges. The original design had five equal stripes of blue, yellow, red, white and green, edged with red, representing the colours of the Qing dynasty flag, but this ribbon was not finally adopted.
The medals are named in indented Roman capitals for the Army, while members of the Royal Marines and Royal Navy were usually issued with unnamed medals.
