= Meritorious Service Medal =

A Meritorious Service Medal is an award presented to denote acts of meritorious service, and sometimes gallantry, that are worthy of recognition. Notable medals with similar names include:

== Singapore ==
- Pingat Jasa Gemilang, or Meritorious Services Medal, awarded to civilians in Singapore
- Pingat Jasa Gemilang (Tentera) (Meritorious Services Medal (Military)) from Singapore

== South Africa ==
- Meritorious Service Medal (Cape of Good Hope)
- Meritorious Service Medal (Natal)
- Meritorious Service Medal (South Africa)

== United States ==
- Coast and Geodetic Survey Meritorious Service Medal
- Merchant Marine Meritorious Service Medal
- Meritorious Civilian Service Award
- Meritorious Service Medal (United States)
- Public Health Service Meritorious Service Medal

== Other countries ==
- Meritorious Service Medal (Australia), awarded 1902–1975
- Medal of Military Merit (Belgium), or Meritorious Service Medal
- Meritorious Service Medal (Canada), one of two meritorious service decorations in Canada
- Meritorious Service Medal (China), second highest military decoration for the People's Liberation Army
- Indian Meritorious Service Medal (for Indian Army)
- Meritorious Service Medal (New Zealand)
- Meritorious Service Medal (United Kingdom)
- Meritorious Service Medal (Vietnam)
- NATO Meritorious Service Medal
