= Arthur T. Dean =

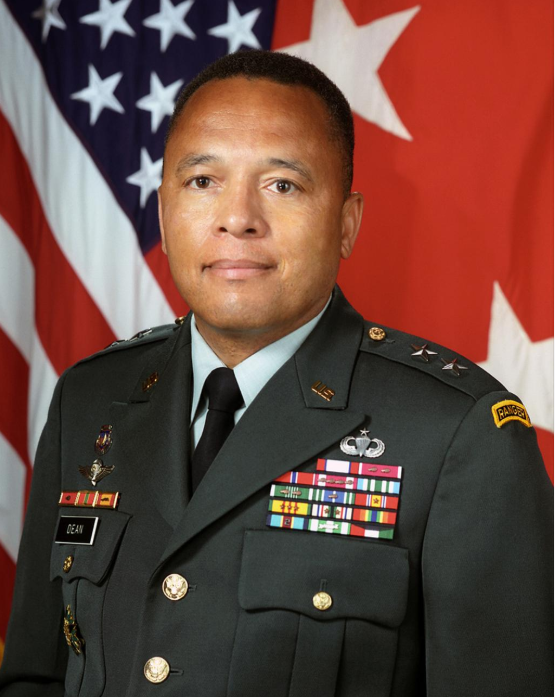
- Military career
- Allegiance: United States
- Service years: 1967 - 1998
- Rank: Major General
- Awards: Army Distinguished Service Medal (2) Legion of Merit (3) Bronze Star Medal (1) Meritorious Service Medal (5)

Arthur T. Dean (born January 6, 1946) is a retired United States Army Major General who served for 31 years. During his military career, he held command positions at the company through brigade levels. He initially served his first two years in the Field Artillery branch, followed by multiple Adjutant General Corps functional area positions. He served six years with the 82nd Airborne Division and the 18th Airborne Corps. He earned Senior Parachutist qualifications from both the United States Army and the Republic of Vietnam, as well as the Army Ranger qualification. His senior assignments included Commander, 18th Personnel and Administration Battalion, 18th Airborne Corps, Adjutant General, US Army V Corps, Commander of the US Army Postal Group Europe, Commander of the U.S. Army 1st Recruiting Brigade, Director of Enlisted Personnel at U.S. Army Personnel Command, Deputy Chief of Staff for Personnel and Installation Management (G-1) at FORSCOM, and Director of Military Personnel Management in the Office of the Deputy Chief of Staff, G-1, at the Pentagon.

After military service, Dean became the Chairman and Chief Executive Officer of Community Anti-Drug Coalitions of America (CADCA), on August 31, 1998 to August 31, 2020. From September 1, 2020 to February 28, 2021, Dean served as the Executive Chairman of CADCA. His responsibilities over his 22.5 year tenure included providing strategic direction, diversification and increasing funding, board leadership, oversight of CADCA missions and employees while being the primary spokesman for the organization.

== Education ==
Dean earned a Bachelor of Arts in History from Morgan State University in 1967 and a Master of Arts in Management and Supervision from Central Michigan University in 1977. He completed the Stanford University Advanced Management Program in 1988. His military education includes the Field Artillery Basic Course, Adjutant General Advanced Course, Command and General Staff College, and the U.S. Army War College. He also completed the U.S. Army Airborne and Ranger courses. Dean graduated from East Polkton High School in 1962. He was recognized as one of Polkton's four "Famous Sons" in honor of his distinguished military career and achievement of the rank of Major General in the United States Army.

== Post-military ==
Dean served as the Chairman and Chief Executive Officer of the CADCA, a nonprofit organization established following a Presidential Commission in 1992. CADCA represents more than 5,000 community coalitions focused on substance use prevention and reduction efforts among youth nationwide . He serves as President of the ROTC Enhancement Team at Morgan State University and he was the first individual inducted into the Bear Battalion Alumni Hall of Fame. Dean is a member of the Adjutant General Corps Hall of Fame and he was recognized as an Outstanding Alumnus of the U.S. Army War College. Additionally, he is a member of the Board of Directors for Safe Pro Group, Inc where he serves as the chairman of the audit committee.

== Awards and decorations ==
Airborne Senior Parachutist Badge

US Army Airborne senior parachutist badge

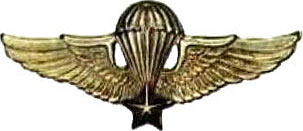

Army Staff Identification Badge

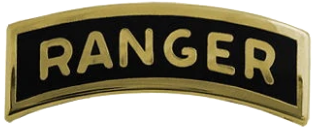

Senior Parachutist Badge (Vietnam)

Ranger tab

United States recruiter awards

Distinguished Service Medal (U.S. Army) (1 Oak Leaf Clusters)

Legion of Merit (2 Oak Leaf Clusters)

Bronze Star Medal

Meritorious Service Medal (United States) (4 oak leaf clusters)

Joint Service Commendation Medal

Army Commendation Medal with 3 oak leaf clusters

Army Achievement Medal with 2 oak leaf clusters

National Defense Service Medal with 1 bronze service star

Vietnam Service Medal with 3 bronze service stars

Southwest Asia Service Medal with 2 bronze service stars

Army Service Ribbon

Overseas Service Ribbon with Award Numeral 2

Vietnam Campaign Medal with 60- clasp

Kuwait Liberation Medal (Kuwait)

Dean is the recipient of the National Conference on Citizenship’s prestigious Franklin Award for Citizen of the Year, awarded in 2016. That same year, he also received the National Institute on Alcohol Abuse and Alcoholism (NIAAA) Senator Harold Hughes Memorial Award. In 2020, he was honored with the National Prevention Network (NPN) Lifetime Achievement Award. In 2021, Dean received the CADCA National Leadership Award.

== Notable memberships ==
Dean has served on multiple boards and advisory groups, including the Executive Council of the Atlanta Area Boy Scouts of America, the Defense Science Board Human Resources Task Force, and the Multijurisdictional Counterdrug Task Force Training Advisory Committee, where he served as chairman. He also served as co-chair and member of the Advisory Commission for the Drug Free Communities Support Program within the Executive Office of the President; a member of the National Institute on Alcohol Abuse and Alcoholism Advisory Council; a member of the Executive Committee of the National Action Alliance for Suicide Prevention; and a member of the Board of Directors of The Madeira School. In addition, he served on the National Advisory Council on Drug Abuse at the National Institutes of Health and as Chairman of the Board of Directors for the Community Anti-Drug Coalitions of America. Dean served as a Member of The Board of Directors of the Army and Airforce Exchange Service.
