= New Zealand Police Meritorious Service Medal =

The New Zealand Police Meritorious Service Medal
- Ribbon bar of the medal
- Awarded for: Meritorious exceptional performance, commitment, or innovation.
- Country: New Zealand
- Eligibility: Personnel of the New Zealand Police
- Status: Currently awarded
- Established: 15 October 2013

Highlights
- Total awarded posthumously: Yes

Order of Wear
- Next (higher): New Zealand Defence Meritorious Service Medal
- Next (lower): New Zealand Public Service Medal

The New Zealand Police Meritorious Service Medal is a police award of the New Zealand Police. Established by Royal Warrant 15 October 2013, the medal may be awarded to recognize meritorious exceptional performance, commitment, or innovation.

== Criteria ==
The New Zealand Police Meritorious Service Medal may be awarded by the Police Commissioner to any police employee. Employees may be recognized for courage, dedication and professionalism in their daily duties. Recipients are expected to be high performers whose service is innovative or inspirational. Dedication to community service or exercising sound professional judgment in difficult situations were also applicable situations that may merit award.

== Appearance ==
The New Zealand Defence Meritorious Service Medal is made of silver and circular in shape. The obverse of the medal bears the effigy of the Sovereign, currently the effigy designed by Ian Rank-Broadley, surrounded by the Royal Styles and Titles for New Zealand. The reverse bears the inscriptions FOR MERITORIOUS SERVICE and HE TOHU HIRANGA surrounding the insignia of the New Zealand Police. The medal was designed by the New Zealand Herald of Arms, Phillip O’Shea CNZM LVO. O’Shea has designed many of the New Zealand awards created since 1973.

The medal is suspended from crimson ribbon, 32 millimetres (1.3 in) wide, with a central stripe of dark blue edged in yellow with yellow edge stripes. Crimson has served as the ribbon color of long service and merit awards, starting with the Army Long Service and Good Conduct Medal in 1830. In 1887, a distinctive New Zealand award the New Zealand Long and Efficient Service Medal utilised a crimson ribbon with two white centre stripes. The imperial Meritorious Service Medal for New Zealand and the subsequent 1985 New Zealand Meritorious Service Medal also used a crimson ribbon, but with a green centre stripe.

Subsequent awards of the medal will be depicted by bars made of silver and silver-gilt bearing a single fern frond. In undress, when a service ribbon is worn alone, a small silver five-pointed star will be worn to indicate subsequent awards.
