= 1918 New Year Honours (MSM) =

New year honours

This is a list of Meritorious Service Medals (MSM) awarded in the 1918 New Year Honours.

The 1918 New Year Honours were appointments by King George V to various orders and honours to reward and highlight good works by citizens of the British Empire. The appointments were published in The London Gazette and The Times in January, February and March 1918.

Unlike the 1917 New Year Honours, the 1918 honours was dominated by rewards for war efforts. As The Times reported: "The New Year Honours represent largely the circumstances of war, and, perhaps, as usual, they also reflect human nature in an obvious form. The list is one of the rare opportunities for the public to scan the names of soldiers who have distinguished themselves in service."

== Recipients of the Meritorious Service Medal (MSM) ==
- Sister Eileen King, Queen Alexandra's Imperial Military Nursing Service (R.). For bravery and devotion to duty on the occasion of a hostile air raid on a casualty clearing station. Although wounded, she continued to give directions for the care of the wounded.

For gallantry in the performance of military duty —

- Cpl. J. B. Leonard, Royal Irish Rifles
- Sgt. W. H. Pollard, West Riding Reg. (Huddersfield)
- Pte. H. B. Taylor, RAMC (Rochdale)

For valuable services rendered with the Armies in the Field during the present War —

- Act. Staff Sergeant J. T. Claireaux, Army Ordnance Corps (Edinburgh)
- Act. Sgt. C. Pledger, Royal Garrison Arty. (Buntingford)
- Staff Sergeant J. Acland, Army Service Corps (East Dulwich)
- Sgt. H. Abbott, Grenadier Guards (Battersea)
- Sgt. A. Adams, RAMC (Netley)
- Army Staff Sergeant W. H. Ahl, Army Ordnance Corps (Fulham)
- Pte. J. G. A. Aiston, Army Service Corps (Watford)
- Staff Sergeant E. Alexander, RAMC (Jersey)
- Sgt. F. Allan, Royal Fusiliers (London)
- Cpl. J. L. Allen, Army Ordnance Corps (Fulham)
- Sgt. C. A. Alp, Lincolnshire Reg. (Leyton)
- Sgt. J. Anderson, Army Ordnance Corps (Sunderland)
- Pte. W. E. Anderson, Hussars (Headington Quarry, Oxford)
- L. Sgt. W. Archer, Labour Corps (Lincoln)
- Sgt. R. Armstrong, Royal Inniskilling Fusiliers (Irvinestown)
- 2nd Cpl. W. Armstrong, Royal Engineers (Hulme)
- Cpl. A. Asher, Army Service Corps (Stoke Newington)
- Sgt. J. H. Ashton, RAMC (Manchester)
- Cpl. F. R. Ashwin, Royal Engineers (Old Brompton)
- Sgt. N. Ashworth, RAMC (Bolton)
- Sgt. T. Atherton, Royal Garrison Arty. (Burnley)
- Sgt. W. J. Auker, Norfolk Reg. (King's Lynn)
- Sgt. C. Austin, Royal West Kent Reg. (nr. Cardiff)
- B.Q.M. Sgt. A. Axson, King's Own Scottish Borderers Dumfries)
- B.Q.M. Sgt. F. Bailey, South Lancashire Reg. (Manchester)
- Pte. A. L. Bale, Army Service Corps (Forest Gate)
- 2nd Cpl. W. A. Ballard, Royal Engineers (Southsea)
- C.S. Maj. A. W. Bamber, Royal Engineers (Eastville)
- Act. R.S. Maj. G. W. Banks, Middlesex Reg. (Staines)
- C.S. Maj. G. T. Barber, Royal Engineers (Birmingham)
- Cpl. J. E. Barber, Army Service Corps (Brighton)
- Pte. E. H. Barfoot, Army Service Corps (New Cross)
- Sgt. F. C. Barfoot, Royal Field Arty. (Portsmouth)
- C.S. Maj. G. W. Barham, Royal Engineers (Leighton)
- Pte. J. Barnard, Army Service Corps (Attleborough)
- Battery Sergeant Major C. Barnes, Royal Garrison Arty. (Bristol)
- Sgt. P. J. Barnes, Army Service Corps (Warwick)
- L. Cpl. D. Barry, Military Mounted Police (Manchester)
- Squadron Q.M.S. D. H. Bartlett, Army Service Corps (Roseberry Square, London)
- Staff Sergeant J. G. Batten, RAMC (St. Helens)
- Sgt. H. J. Baugh, Royal Garrison Arty. (Plymouth)
- Sgt. C. Baughan, Army Service Corps (Bournemouth)
- Cpl. W. R. Beale, Royal Engineers (York)
- L. Cpl. R. H. Beaumont, Royal Engineers (Woking)
- C.Q.M.S. A. J. Beckerleg, Army Service Corps (Willesden)
- Sgt. Major D. J. D. Belford, RAMC (Dundee)
- L. Cpl. D. Bell, Cameron Highlanders (Glasgow)
- C.S. Maj. E. C. Bennett, Royal Engineers (Penzance)
- Staff Sergeant Major C. W. Bennett, Army Service Corps (Fishergate)
- Sgt. F. Bennett, Royal Field Arty. (Bristol)
- Sgt. F. T. G. Bennett, Royal Field Arty. (Woolwich)
- By/Sergeant Major N. S. Bennett, Royal Garrison Arty. (Southsea)
- Sgt. Major S. Bennett, Military Mounted Police (Hoddesdon)
- C.Q.M.S. F. Benson, Army Service Corps (Ayr)
- L. Cpl. R. H. Bentley, Royal Engineers (Leicester)
- Sgt. W. J. Benton, Machine Gun Corps (Ilford)
- Squadron Q.M.S. C. E. Berbridge, Army Service Corps (Fulham)
- Sgt. W. H. Bernard, Royal Fusiliers (Custom House, London)
- L. Cpl. V. L. Berrie, Royal Engineers (Tooting)
- Sgt. J. Berry (Andover)
- Pte. J. E. Bettoney, Army Service Corps (Leicester)
- Pte. H. J. Bevan, Royal Army Veterinary Corps (St. Pauls Cray)
- Sgt. G. O'H. Beveridge, Military Mounted Police (Rathmines)
- Pte. F. C. Biggs, Army Service Corps (Westbourne Pk.)
- Q.M.S. J. W. Birch, Army Service Corps (Leeds)
- Battery Sergeant Major F. Bishop, Royal Field Arty. (Plumstead)
- Sgt. W. F. Blackburn, Royal Engineers (York)
- Troop Sergeant Major J. Blackburn, Royal Engineers (Blackburn)
- Cpl. F. W. Blackmore, Army Service Corps (Woolton)
- Spr. R. Blakemore, Royal Engineers (Walthamstow)
- Tmp R.S. Maj. W. Blackwood, Middlesex Reg. (Stoke Gabriel, near Totnes)
- Conductor L. A. Blake, Royal Marines (South Shields)
- Pte. E. Blenkhorn, Army Service Corps (Roundhay)
- Staff Sergeant R. Boddy, RAMC (Cardiff)
- Sgt. G. A. Booker, Royal Flying Corps (Wembley)
- S/Q.M.S.ergeant H. Bolton, Army Service Corps (Manchester)
- Staff Sergeant Major S. A. Bone, Yeomanry (Titmarsh)
- Squadron Q.M.S. S. F. Bonner, Army Service Corps (Colchester)
- Sgt. W. Bostock, Yeomanry (Teignmouth)
- Staff Sergeant W. R. Bougourd, Army Ordnance Corps (Canning Town)
- Sgt. W. Boughey, Royal Garrison Arty. (Skegby)
- Sgt. E. S. Bourton, RAMC (Brixton)
- Sgt. J. Bovill, Army Service Corps (Leyton)
- Sgt. Major Foreman of Works J. Boyd, Royal Engineers (Fulwood)
- B.Q.M. Sgt. J. W. Boyle, Gordon Highlanders (Port Glasgow)
- Mechanic Sergeant Major J. Bradburn, Army Service Corps (E. Preston)
- Far. Q.M.S. I. Brayton, Army Service Corps (Aldershot)
- Sgt. Major J. Brett, RAMC (Plumstead)
- L. Cpl. J. Brew, Machine Gun Corps (Belfast)
- C.Q.M.S. R. J. Brewer, Machine Gun Corps (Tottenham)
- Sgt. S. J. Brewrn, Leicestershire Reg. (Leicester)
- L. Cpl. A. C. J. Bridges, Military Mounted Police (Tonbridge)
- Pte. B. J. Brown, A.S.C. (Havant)
- Battery Sergeant Major J. A. J. Brown, Royal Field Arty. (East Finchley)
- Sgt. W. Brown, Royal Engineers (Edinburgh)
- C.S. Maj. W. T. Brown, Army Service Corps (Hove)
- Sgt. A. Buckingham, Royal Engineers (Plumstead)
- Battery Sergeant Major F. J. Buckland, Royal Field Arty. (Exeter)
- Q.M.S. A. Buckner, RAMC (Glasgow)
- Conductor E. W. Buffee, Army Ordnance Corps (Whitley Bay)
- R.S. Maj. T. H. Bull, Royal Field Arty. (E. Loughton)
- Pte. P. A. Bullock, Army Service Corps (Forest Gate)
- Staff Sergeant Major G. Bunch, Army Service Corps (Aldershot)
- Reg.al Q.M.S. C. Bundock, Northumberland Fusiliers (Wood Green, London)
- R.S. Maj. F. Burdett, Dragoon Guards (Birkenhead)
- Staff Sergeant C. H. Burghart, Army Service Corps (Ferryhill)
- Cpl. T. G. Burnard, Army Service Corps (Seaton)
- Battery Sergeant Major F. Burt, Royal Garrison Arty. (Easton)
- Sgt. R. Burton, Royal Engineers (E. Berwick)
- Sgt. R. Burton, North Staffordshire Reg. (Cheltenham)
- Cpl. R. Burton, Cameron Highlanders (Livingstone Station)
- Tmp R.S. Maj. T. Burton, R. FA. (Harrogate)
- Far. Sergeant G. N. R. Buehnell, Royal Field Arty. (Notting Hill, London)
- Cpl. O. L. Butler, Army Service Corps (Birkenhead)
- C.S. Maj. A. Bycroft, Army Service Corps (Liverpool)
- Cpl. E. W. F. Cager, Royal Engineers (Brighton)
- C.S. Maj. W. E. Calcott, Royal Engineers (Harrow)
- Sgt. A. S. Camfield, Army Service Corps (Hepburn-on-Tyne)
- L. Cpl. E. W. A. Campbell, Middlesex Reg. (East Ham)
- C.S. Maj. J. Campbell, Army Service Corps (Lurgan)
- Cpl. W. H. Campbell Army Service Corps (Burnley)
- Sgt. Major J. B. Cantrell, RAMC (Warrington)
- Bombr. H. Carley, Royal Garrison Arty. (Dover)
- C.S. Maj. S. H. Carman, Royal Engineers (Islington)
- Sgt. W. Carroll, Manchester Reg. (Oldham)
- Cpl. G. W. Carter, Royal Flying Corps (Swindon)
- L. Cpl. H. Carter, Army Ordnance Corps (Gillingham)
- Pte. E. L. Cartwright, RAMC (Birmingham)
- Sgt. J. Carver, Royal Engineers (Gateshead)
- Act. Staff Sergeant C. L. Caswell, Army Ordnance Corps, attd. 67th Siege Battery, Royal Garrison Arty. (Taunton)
- Sgt. W. W. Cater, Yorkshire Light Inf. (Ossett)
- Sgt. A. L. Chadwick, Royal Field Arty. (Long-sight)
- L. Cpl. A. E. Chare, Royal Engineers (Sutton Coldfield)
- Pte. H. Charles worth, London Reg. (Huddersfield)
- Gnr. C. E. Chick, Royal Garrison Arty. (Sunderland)
- Fitter Sergeant G. E. Chirgwin, Royal Flying Corps (Streatham)
- Sgt. A. E. Chisnall, Royal Engineers (Hindley Green)
- Act. C.S. Maj. W. Christie, Royal Engineers (E. Chatham)
- Sgt. J. T. Churchyard, Royal Field Arty. (Strand, London)
- Bombr. G. S. Clapp, Royal Garrison Arty. (Poplar)
- Act. R.S. Maj. F. J. Clark, East Lancashire Reg. (Plumstead)
- Spr. J. P. Clark, Royal Engineers (Denton)
- Dvr. A. L. Clarke, Army Service Corps (Grantham)
- Bombr. C. E. Clarke, Royal Garrison Arty. (Torquay)
- Sgt. J. H. Clarke, Manchester Reg. (Altrincham)
- Sgt. Major F. A. Clements, Mil Prov. S. Corps (Fulham)
- Squadron Q.M.S. C. W. Cliff, Army Service Corps (Wolverhampton)
- Cpl. H. L. Clifford, Gloucestershire Reg. (Golden Valley)
- C.S. Maj. A. Coates, Royal Engineers (Gainsborough)
- Supt Clk Q.M.S. E. Coates, Rifle Brigade (Poole)
- Pte. W. Cochrane, Royal Army Veterinary Corps
- Q.M.S. J. A. Cockaday, Royal Garrison Arty. (Freshwater, Isle of Wight)
- Sgt. F. Colclough, North Staffordshire Reg. (Fenton)
- Spr. A. J. Cole, Royal Engineers (Biggleswade)
- Gnr. F. E. Coleman, Royal Garrison Arty. (Fulham)
- Pte. H. J. Colhna, Army Service Corps (Rye)
- Staff Sergeant J. Collins, Army Ordnance Corps (Walworth)
- C.S. Maj. W. Collins, Army Service Corps (Islington)
- L. Cpl. H. A. Collison, Military Foot Police (Middlesbro)
- Sgt. A. J. Cook, Army Service Corps (Manor Park, London)
- Sgt. A. J. Cook, Royal Flying Corps (Newcastle upon Tyne)
- B.Q.M. Sgt. H. Cooke, Grenadier Guards (Northampton)
- Pte. W. J. Cooke, Army Service Corps (E. Woolwich)
- Pte. T. B. W. Cookson, Army Service Corps (Battersea)
- Cpl. C. E. Cooper, Rifle Brigade (Bexley Heath)
- Spr. J. E. Connolly, Royal Engineers (nr Crump, sail)
- Pte. T. Connolly, Royal Irish Reg. (Edinburgh)
- Sgt. T. Corless, Army Service Corps (Blackpool)
- Spr. T. Cosher, Royal Engineers (Barry, Wales)
- C.S. Maj. J. T. Coverley, Royal Engineers (Chesterfield)
- Pte. W. Cowell, Liverpool Reg. (Douglas, Isle of M)
- Pte. H. W. G. Cox, East Kent Reg. (Ashford, Middlesex)
- J. H. Cox, Army Service Corps (Gosport)
- Pte. Machine Gun L. Cox, Army Service Corps (Leigh)
- Spr. J. Cracknell, Royal Engineers (Whitstorie)
- Pte. A. J. Crisp, Duke of Cornwall's Light Inf., attd. Inf. Brigade (Westminster)
- Spr. W. Cromarty, Royal Engineers (Newcastle upon Tyne)
- Staff Sergeant Foreman of Works H. G. Croot, Royal Engineers (Mutley)
- Sgt. F. Crosby, Army Service Corps (Langham)
- Sgt. F. T. Croxford, Labour Corps (Maidenhead, Berks.)
- Sgt. H. A. Cruxton, Army Service Corps (Birmingham)
- Supt Clerk W. Cullen, Royal Berkshire Reg. (Aughnacloy, County Tyrone)
- Sgt. T. Cummins, Royal Flying Corps (Bristol)
- Sgt. J. A. Cundy, Royal Flying Corps (St. Johns Wood)
- Sgt. W. Currie, Royal Garrison Arty. (Harrogate)
- Spr. H. L. Curtis, Royal Engineers (Tufnell Park, London)
- RQM Sergeant F. Dale, Royal Lancaster Reg. (Plumstead)
- Q.M.S. W. H. Daniels, RAMC (Linthorpe)
- Staff Sergeant S. J. Daly, Army Service Corps (Jersey Army Service Corps (Pimlico)
- C.Q.M.S. F. Owen, Royal Engineers (Chatham)
- R.S. Maj. S. Oxford, Dragoons (Felixstowe)
- Staff Sergeant A. Padget, Army Service Corps (Wakefield)
- Sgt. G. T. Palmer, Royal Engineers (Beaumaris)
- Mechanist Staff Sergeant J. W. Paltridge, Army Service Corps (Plymouth)
- Pte. C. V. Parker, Army Service Corps (Brighton)
- Sgt. J. Parker, Army Service Corps (Braintree)
- Staff Sergeant J. Parr, RAMC (St. Helens)
- Cpl. W. E. Patterson, Army Service Corps (Cork)
- Sgt. A. Pattison, RAMC (Sheffield)
- Sgt. S. A. Payne, Royal Engineers (Bootle)
- Pte. A. H. Peacock, Army Service Corps (now Royal Fusiliers) (E. Woolwich)
- Armament Q.M.S. F. E. Peake, Army Ordnance Corps (Woolwich)
- Battery Sergeant Major J. Pearoe, Royal Field Arty. (Stoke-on-Trent)
- Staff Sergeant A. Pearson, RAMC (Swmton)
- C.Q.M.S. J. H. Pearson, Cheshire Reg. (Stockport)
- R.S. Maj. A. Peasgood, Lincolnshire Reg. (Stamford)
- Staff Sergeant Major C. G. Pedder, Army Service Corps (Beckenham)
- Battery Sergeant Major G. J. Penn, Royal Field Arty. (Tooting)
- C.S. Maj. A. Penny, Royal Engineers (E. Cork)
- Pte. H. T. Penny, London Reg. (W. Baling)
- C.S. Maj. J. Penwarden, Royal Engineers (Cheriton)
- B.Q.M. Sgt. T. W. Percivall, London Reg. (Wood Green)
- Act. Sgt. E. D. Petter, Royal Garrison Arty. (West Wittering)
- Sgt. T. Pettigrew, Labour Corps (Paisley)
- Q.M.S. F. A. Philbrook, RAMC (Colchester)
- Sgt. E. J. Phillips, Royal Engineers (E. Swindon)
- Staff Sergeant H. S. Phillpott, Army Ordnance Corps (Ilford)
- Gnr. B. Pick, Royal Garrison Arty. (Chopwell)
- Sgt. C. Pipe, North Lancashire Reg. (Bungay)
- Cpl. J. Pirie, Gordon Highlanders (Airdrie)
- C.S. Maj. H. Placey, A. G. Staff (Henley-on-Thames)
- Pte. A. H. Pollaid, Army Service Corps (Leicester)
- Sgt. E. C. Pope, Rifle Brigade (Southampton)
- Cpl. E. W. Pople, Royal Engineers (Burnham)
- C.Q.M.S. F. G. Pook, Machine Gun Corps (Upper Tooting, London)
- Sgt. P. J. Pook, RAMC (Sidcup)
- L. Cpl. D. G. S. Porter, Military Foot Police, attd. Military Mounted Police (Aldershot)
- Q.M.S. T. H. Potter, RAMC (Tuebrook, Liverpool)
- Sgt. H. H. Pottinger, Nottinghamshire and Derbyshire Reg. (Nottingham)
- Act. Company, Sergeant Major R. Prance, A. G. Staff (Bideford)
- L. Cpl. A. L. Pratt, Army Service Corps (Nuneaton)
- C.S. Maj. F. J. Pratt, Royal Engineers (Ipswich)
- Sgt. L. A. Pratt, RAMC (Kirtlington)
- Sgt. A. N. Preston, Army Service Corps (Newcastle upon Tyne)
- Sgt. W. H. Preston, Royal Fusiliers (Wimbledon)
- Staff Sergeant Major J. A. Pringle, Army Service Corps (Maryport)
- Sgt. W. Pringle, Royal Army Veterinary Corps (Newmarket)
- Petty Ofc. W. Punton, Royal Naval Volunteer Reserve (Pelaw-on-Tyne)
- Squadron Q.M.S. G. E. Pyne, Army Service Corps (Conways Cross, County Sligo)
- Fitter Sergeant F. Ramsav, Royal Flying Corps (Snaith)
- C.Q.M.S. A. G. Randall, Royal Engineers (Walthamstow)
- Cpl. J. O. Handle, RAMC (Leicester)
- Battery Sergeant Major A. G. Rae, Royal Garrison Arty. (Ditton)
- Cpl. T. W. Rea, Army Service Corps (Spittal)
- Battery Sergeant Major W. Read, Royal Field Arty. (Ipswich)
- Sgt. H. Rekes, Army Service Corps (Aldershot)
- Sgt. T. J. Rees, Royal Engineers (West Ham)
- Staff Sergeant Major W. R. Rees, Army Service Corps (Crawthorne)
- Dvr. H. Render, Royal Garrison Arty. (Middleham)
- Squadron Q.M.S. G. Richardson, Army Service Corps (Shotley Bridge)
- Sgt. J. Richardson, Northumberland Fusiliers (Tyne Dock)
- Sgt. Major S. Richmond, Army Service Corps (Shoreham-by-Sea)
- Cpl. T. S. Rickard, Army Service Corps (Tottenham)
- Sgt. T. W. Rider, Middlesex Reg. (Hoxton)
- Sgt. A. E. Ridley, Royal Engineers (Regents Park, London)
- Cpl. J. Ripley, Royal Engineers (Leeds)
- Sgt. J. H. Roberts, London Reg. (Anerley, London)
- Mechanic Sergeant Major W. Robertson, Army Service Corps (Hampstead)
- Sgt. C. Robinson, Army Service Corps (Farnborough)
- L. Cpl. J. Robson, Royal Engineers (High Haworth)
- C.S. Maj. W. Robson, Gordon Highlanders (Glasgow)
- 2nd Cpl. L. J. Rogers, Royal Engineers (Tottenham)
- Sgt. A. Roper, Dorsetshire Reg. (Arne)
- B.Q.M. Sgt. H. Rose, London Reg. (Forest Hill, London)
- Sgt. W. R. Rose, Machine Gun Corps (Birmingham)
- 1st Class Staff Sergeant Major T. Rowan, Army Service Corps (Limerick)
- Cpl. B. H. Russell, Liverpool Reg. (New Brighton)
- Staff Sergeant A. J. Ryan, Army Service Corps (Saffron Walden)
- L. Cpl. T. Ryan, Royal Engineers (Patricroft)
- Sgt. J. Salter, Army Ordnance Corps (Pawlett)
- Sgt. A. W. A. L. Sample, Royal Engineers (York)
- C.Q.M.S. Sergeant J. Samuels, Royal Engineers (Ashton-on-Mersey)
- Dvr. E. Sandroff, Army Service Corps (Homerton)
- Mechanist Staff Sergeant D. W. Sarbutt, Army Service Corps (Ipswich)
- Sgt. R. H. Sarginson, Royal Fusiliers (West Hartlepool)
- C.S. Maj. C. Saunders, Labour Corps (Lattlehampton)
- Sgt. C. S. Saunders, Royal Engineers (Fulham, London)
- L. Cpl. W, Saville, Royal Engineers (Thorpe, Leeds)
- Q.M.S. C. A. Scarbrow, RAMC (Banwell)
- Cpl. W. Scobie, Royal Highlanders (Blackford)
- Cpl. A. Scott, Royal Engineers (Tranent)
- Cpl. J. Scott, Royal Engineers (Newcastle)
- Tmp M.S. M. H. Schofield, Army Service Corps (E. Colchester)
- Tmp Sub-Condr J. Sedgwick, Army Ordnance Corps (Howgill)
- Sgt. H. W. Selden, RAMC (Lincoln)
- Sqn. Cpl. Major R. Sensier, Life Guards (Ascot)
- Act. Cpl. J. Sewell, Labour Corps (late Royal Fusiliers) (Canning Town, London)
- Staff Sergeant Major W. Sewell, North Irish Horse (Dublin)
- Sgt. C. J. Sharp, Royal Engineers (Aldershot)
- Sgt. J. Sharp, York & Lancaster Reg. (Haigh, near Barnsley) London
- 1st Writer L. E. Sharp, Royal Naval Volunteer Reserve (Brixton)
- Sgt. R. Sharp, Royal Engineers (Taunton)
- C.S. Maj. W. A. Sharpe, Royal Engineers (Wandsworth)
- L. Cpl. A. Shaw, Royal Lancaster Reg. (Bowerham)
- B.Q.M. Sgt. J. Shepherd, Royal Warwickshire Reg. (Coventry)
- Cpl. S. Shield, Army Ordnance Corps (Liverpool)
- Sgt. S. H. Shinton, South Staffordshire Reg. (Wolverhampton)
- Pte. F. W. Shorney, Army Service Corps (Neath)
- Staff Sergeant F. V. Sibbald, Army Service Corps (Cork)
- Staff Sergeant Major T.F . Siddle, Army Service Corps (Elswick)
- Mechanic Staff Sergeant D. Silverstone, Army Service Corps (Leyton)
- Squadron Q.M.S. W. Silvester, Royal Engineers (Portsmouth)
- Pte. J. J. Simmons, Army Service Corps (Kingstown, County Dublin)
- R.S. Maj. W. E. Simmons, Royal Field Arty. (Sheffield)
- Sgt. J. Slater, Royal Garrison Arty. (Southsea)
- Sgt. H. Sleigh, Army Service Corps (Walsall)
- C.S. Maj. A. Smith, Army Service Corps (Stratford)
- Sgt. A. Smith, London Reg. (Rotherhithe)
- Sgt. D. W. Smith, Northumberland Fusiliers (Aberdeen)
- B.Q.M. Sgt. F. Smith, Royal Field Arty. (Walton-on-Thames)
- Pte. H. P. Smith, Army Service Corps (Twickenham)
- Dvr. J. Smith, Army Service Corps (Shepherd's Bush)
- Staff Sergeant Major Sup Clk R. Smith, Middlesex Reg. (West Baling)
- Sgt. R. A. Smith, Royal Engineers CPaisley)
- Sgt. W. Smith, Northumberland Fusiliers (Hull)
- C.S. Maj. J. Smoothey, Machine Gun Corps (Rochford)
- Act. Sgt. Major W. J. Smyrk, Royal Flying Corps (Islington)
- Far. Q.M.S. J. C. Sobey, Dragoon Guards (Hornsey)
- Squadron Q.M.S. E. N. Soilleux, Army Service Corps (Whitstable)
- Sgt. Royal Arty. Sparling, York & Lancaster Reg. (Sheffield)
- C.S. Maj. W. J. Speller, Royal Engineers (Maidenhead)
- L. Cpl. A. Spmks, South Lancashire Reg. (Warrington)
- Cpl. A. J. Spry, Royal Marine Light Inf. (Landulpa)
- Sgt. W. D. Stafford, Royal Fusiliers (Pietermaritzburg)
- Tmp Sub Conductor F. G. Stagg, Army Ordnance Corps (Portsmouth)
- Sgt. H. Standen, Military Mounted Police (Wanrkworth)
- Sgt. W. A. Stephens, Army Service Corps (Cloughfold)
- Squadron Q.M.S. J. Stephenson, Army Service Corps (Gateshead)
- Sgt. B. Stoddart Durham Light Inf. (Barnard Castle)
- Cpl. A. J. Stokes, Royal Garrison Arty. (Poole)
- Cpl. A. Stone, Army Ordnance Corps (Erith)
- Sgt. A. Strain, Royal Engineers (Alexandria, N.B.)
- Conductor J. Strange, Army Ordnance Corps (St. Heliers, Jersey)
- Sgt. A. T. Strivens, Army Service Corps (East Ham)
- Superindending Clerk G. T. Stroud, Royal Engineers (Gillingham)
- 2nd Cpl. G. D. Sutton, Royal Engineers (Northwich)
- Fitter Sergeant W. H. Sweeting, Royal Flying Corps (Cirencester)
- Sgt. W. Sylvester, Army Service Corps (Brownhills)
- 1st Class Staff Sergeant Major T. A. Taoey, Army Service Corps (Barnsbury)
- Sgt. A. Tannahill, Northumberland Fusiliers (Gateshead)
- Cpl. E. C. Tansley, RAMC (Coventry)
- Sup. Clerk H. Targett, Royal Engineers (Houghton)
- Sgt. C. A. Taylor, Royal Engineers (Farnham)
- Conductor E. H. Taylor, Army Ordnance Corps (St. George's, Bermuda)
- Sgt. F. W. D. Taylor, Army Service Corps (Weeley)
- Act. Sgt. H. D. Taylor, Royal Engineers (Brackley)
- Tmp Sergeant Major H. W. Taylor, Royal Engineers (Gillingham)
- Sgt. T. Taylor, Machine Gun Corps (Leominster)
- Sgt. W. L. Taylor, Army Service Corps (Nunhead)
- Sgt. F. W. Toake, Royal Garrison Arty. (Tatterham)
- Sgt. T. Thomas, Royal Berkshire Reg. (Briton, Ferry, Glamorgan)
- Sgt. W. Thomasson, Shropshire Light Inf. (Bolton, Lancaster)
- Sgt. Major A. Thompson, RAMC (Manchester)
- C.Q.M.S. P. Thompson, Machine Gun Corpsr (Knottingley)
- Cpl. W. F. B. Thompson, Labour Corps (Kensal Rise)
- L. Cpl. J. Mel Thomson, Royal Engineers (Newcastle upon Tyne)
- Act. Sgt. J. Thornhill, Labour Corps (Customs House)
- Sgt. T. Thornly, Royal Army Veterinary Corps (Colchester)
- C.S. Maj. R. Tildesley, Army Service Corps (Willenhall)
- Bombr. C. W. Tilt, Royal Garrison Arty. (Browsgrove)
- Pte. A. W. Tippitts, Army Service Corps, attd. Labour Company, now Royal Engineers (E. Woolwich)
- Act. Staff Sergeant A. Tomkins, Army Ordnance Corps (Portslade)
- C.Q.M.S. W. Trappett, Royal Engineers (Curragh)
- Staff Sergeant V. Tnppv RAMC (Clapton)
- Sup Clerk Sergeant Major M. Trippas, Rifle Brigade Mold)
- Squadron Q.M.S. C. H. Tuke, Army Service Corps (Lichfield)
- Sgt. A. N. Turner, Army Service Corps (Whitstable)
- Act. Sgt. H. Turner, A.G. Staff (Norwich)
- C.Q.M.S. J. Turner, Manchester Reg. (Bradford)
- C.S. Maj. J. Turner, Royal Engineers (Gillingham)
- Sgt. W. J. Turner, RAMC (Lurgan, County Armagh)
- Cpl. F. Tustin, Royal Engineers (Hither Green)
- Cpl. V. V. J. Unmey, Army Ordnance Corps (Lower Monkstown, County Cork)
- Bombr. R. Underwood, Royal Garrison Arty. (Kildare)
- Sgt. G. Utley, Royal Garrison Arty. (York)
- Sgt. A. Valentine, Royal Garrison Arty. (Leeds)
- Battery Sergeant Major L. W. Venables, Royal Garrison Arty. (Saltby)
- R.S. Maj. J. Vevers, Royal Field Arty. (Chapel-en-le-Frith)
- Pte. J. Vincent, Army Service Corps (now Labour Corps) (E. Woolwich)
- R.S. Maj. A. Vian, Royal Field Arty. (South Norwood)
- L. Cpl. W. H. Waddell, MF P. (Corby)
- C.S. Maj. Arty. Clerk E. B. Wager, Royal Garrison Arty. (Wellingborough)
- Sgt. J. Wainwright, Royal Flying Corps (Caledonian Road, London)
- Sgt. W. J. Wainwright, Royal Engineers (Smallthorne)
- C.Q.M.S. F. C. Walker, Highland Light Inf. (Tuffnel Park)
- Act. Staff Sergeant J. Walker, Army Ordnance Corps (Halifax)
- Pte. R. W. Walker, Army Ordnance Corps (Pembroke Dock)
- Cpl. E. E. Wallace, Royal Engineers (Bury St. Edmunds)
- Mechanic Staff Sergeant P. Walmsley, Army Service Corps (Bolton)
- Pte. C. E. Walter, Army Service Corps (Woolwich)
- Squadron Q.M.S. J. Walthew, Army Service Corps (Middlesbro)
- Sgt. Major A. J. Warburton, Royal Army Veterinary Corps (Bradford)
- Pte. F. Ward, Army Service Corps (Manchester)
- Cpl. W. H. Ward, Duke of Cornwall's Light Inf. (Bude)
- Cpl. F. C. Warden, RAMC (Derby)
- Act. C.Q.M.S. S. L. Wareham, Royal Warwickshire Reg. (Birmingham)
- Pte. J. Waters, RAMC (Tyldesley)
- Cpl. A. Watson, Army Service Corps (Boroughbridge)
- Sgt. T. Watson, Royal Garrison Arty. (Warrington)
- Sgt. H. Webb, Royal Flying Corps (Finsbury Park, London)
- Fitter Sergeant T. O. Webber, Royal Flying Corps (Hawkhurst)
- C. G. Webster, Royal Field Arty. (East Ham)
- Sgt. N. F. Webster, West Yorkshire Reg.(Leeds)
- Cpl. A. Weeks, Royal Engineers (Dublin)
- Staff Sergeant Major B. G. Weiss, Army Service Corps (Salisbury)
- Air Mechanic, 1st Class J. G. Weldon, Royal Flying Corps (Sefton Park)
- R.S. Maj. G. H. Weller, Royal Engineers (Newark)
- Sgt. A. Wells, Royal West Kent Reg. (Hawkhnrstt
- Tmp Staff Sergeant Major D. Wells, Army Service Corps (Folkestone)
- Sgt. H. O. Welsh, Durham Light Inf. (Gateshead)
- Q.M.S. T. Wheway, RAMC (Leicester)
- Sgt. W. Whiston, Middlesex Reg. (Hanley, Staffs.)
- Fitter Sergeant E. E. White, Royal Flying Corps (Camberley)
- Q.M.S. H. White, RAMC (Waisail)
- Sgt. J. White, Royal Engineers (Willesden)
- Pte. W. White, Dragoon Guards (Wickford)
- Cpl. W. H. C. White, Gloucestershire Reg. (Bristol)
- Staff Sergeant L. J. Whitehorn, Royal Engineers (Clapham, London)
- Sgt. J. W. Whitehouse, Army Service Corps (Tipton)
- Sgt. L. Whiteley, Army Service Corps (E. Liverpool)
- C.S. Maj. F. H. Whitfield, Oxfordshire & Buckinghamshire Light Inf. (South Tottenham)
- Cpl. W. Wignall, RAMC (Liverpool)
- Sgt. Major Superintendent Clerk W. Wilcock, Royal Engineers (E. Bristol)
- Armament Q.M.S. J. Wilkinson, Army Ordnance Corps (Fleet)
- Staff Sergeantmith T. Wilkinson, Royal Engineers (Fermoy)
- Cpl. W. E. Willcockson, Labour Corps (Kingsland Road, London)
- Squadron Q.M.S. F. A. Williams, Army Service Corps (Altrincham)
- L. Cpl. G. Williams, Military Mounted Police (Richmond)
- Sgt. W. G. Willis, Royal Flying Corps (Bristol)
- Pte. W. J. Willis, Army Service Corps (Swindon)
- Act. Sgt. Major A. H. Willson, Army Ordnance Corps (Penge)
- Tmp Sub Conductor T. Wilson, Army Ordnance Corps (Plumstead)
- Q.M.S. W. Wisdom, Royal Engineers (Shepherd's Bush)
- Pte. A. L. Witts, Army Service Corps (Worcester)
- Sgt. W. Wonfor, Labour Corps (Surbiton)
- Sgt. E. J. Wood, Military Mounted Police (Taplow)
- Act. Staff Sergeant T. W. Wood, Army Ordnance Corps (Stafford)
- Sgt. J. Woodcock, Royal Field Arty. (South Shields)
- Sgt. A. Woods, Labour Corps (Lytham, Lancaster)
- Q.M.S. J. A. I. Woods, South Wales Borderers (Diss)
- R.S. Maj. A. Worsfold, Royal Field Arty. (Winsford)
- Far. Staff Sergeant A. A. Wright, R. M. (New Cross, London)
- Gnr. J. Wright, Royal Garrison Arty. (Lincoln)
- Pte. J. Wright, Royal Army Veterinary Corps (West Lynn)
- Sgt. J. Wright, Royal Scots (Edinburgh)
- Sgt. W. L. R. Wright, Royal Army Veterinary Corps (Manchester)
- Pte. G. H. Wrigglesworth, East Yorkshire Reg. (E. York)
- Sgt. J. R. Yarrow, Royal Garrison Arty. (Shoeburyness)
- Q.M.S. S. W. Yardley, Royal Engineers (Moulton)
- C.S. Maj. H. Yarnall, Army Service Corps (Leicester)
- B.Q.M. Sgt. H. Yates, King's Royal Rifle Corps (Wolverhampton)
- C.S. Maj. W. C. Yealand, Nottinghamshire and Derbyshire Reg. (Nottingham)
- C.Q.M.S. A. J. Young, Royal Engineers (Hulme)
- Pte. P. A. Young, Army Service Corps (Lewisham)
- Sgt. V. L. Young, Royal Engineers (Chatham)
- Pte. D. Smyth, Royal Irish Rifles (Dromore)
- Pte. H. Clarke, Army Service Corps (Whitchurch)

Australian Imperial Force

- Sgt. P. de M. Abbott, Army Medical Corps
- 2nd Cpl. C. P. Atkins, Engineers
- Sgt. H. C. Behaun, Army Medical Corps
- Sgt. L. K. Bridge, Inf.
- Sgt. W. A. Bryant, Inf.
- Able Seamanattery Q.M.S. P. S. Game, Inf.
- Sgt. W. H. H. Carpenter, Army Service Corps
- Sgt. W. C. Cheesenian, Light Trench Mortar Battery
- Warrant Ofc. Artr. F. N. Conradi, Army Ordnance Corps
- Warrant Ofc. 1st Class, W. C. Copperthwaite, Inf.
- Warrant Ofc. J. M. Davis, Division HQ Clerical Staff
- Sgt. H. O. S. Drew, Inf.
- Sgt. D. J. Duggan, Field Arty. Brigade
- Sgt. F. F. Eddie, Army Medical Corps
- Warrant Ofc. S. E. Emms, Army Medical Corps
- Sgt. C. Evans, Inf.
- Sgt. J. Flackfield, Engineers
- 2nd Cpl. J. D. Fletcher, Engineers
- Sgt. A. H. Fortescue, Army Service Corps
- Warrant Ofc. G. W. Fulton, AHQ Clerical Staff
- Warrant Ofc. J. T. Goodhall, Army Medical Corps
- Sgt. H. C. Hopkins, Inf.
- C.Q.M.S. C. H. Howitt, Inf.
- Staff Sergeant R. L. Kennedy, Army Medical Corps
- Staff Sergeant W. H. S. Kerr, Anzac Prov. Corps
- Warrant Ofc. 1st Class, L. L. Lethlean, Engineers
- Cpl. S. F. E. Liebert, Engineers
- L. Cpl. W. G. Lincoln, Cyclist Battalion
- Staff Sergeant E. A. Lockhart, Inf.
- Warrant Ofc. G. N. Mackie, Inf.
- Pte. T. W. Martin, Inf.
- Dvr. W. P. Martin, Engineers
- B.Q.M. Sgt. J. J. McCredie, Army Ordnance Corps
- Staff Sergeant D. McNaught, Royal Army Veterinary Corps
- Sgt. W. H. Millar, Engineers
- Cpl. N. G. Mills, Engineers
- C.Q.M.S. O. T. Mills, Inf.
- Staff Sergeant G. L. Morris, Inf.
- B.Q.M. Sgt. R. A. Murdoch, Inf.
- Sgt. G. Patrick, Engineers
- Tmp Warrant Ofc. H. L. Peck, Royal Army Pay Corps
- Warrant Ofc. W. Poole, Army Medical Corps
- L. Cpl. J. H. Powell, Inf.
- Staff Sergeant E. P. Prendergast, Inf.
- L. Cpl. J. W. Quarrie, Army Service Corps
- Warrant Ofc. F. C. Roberts, Army Medical Corps
- Cpl. A. Sinclair, Engineers
- Sgt. D. R. Smith, Anzac Hqrs
- R.S. Maj. E. E. Solley, Clerical Staff, HQ
- C.S. Maj. J. H. Steer, Engineers
- Cpl. J. S. Stevenson, Inf.
- Tmp Warrant Ofc. S. J. Stott, HQ
- C.Q.M.S. C. R. Stubbs, Army Service Corps
- Sgt. H. C. G. Thurlow, Engineers
- B.Q.M. Sgt. F. G. Turner, Inf.
- C.S. Maj. /C. J. Vause, Engineers
- Conductor T. D. Watson, Army Ordnance Corps
- Tmp Conductor M. C. Welch, Army Ordnance Corps
- B.Q.M. Sgt. A. W. T. White, Pioneer Battalion
- Staff Sergeant Major T. C. Wilkinson, Anzac Prov. Corps
- Sgt. J. R. Wilson, Inf.
- Warrant Ofc. A. F. Woollard, Engineers
- Sgt. H. F. Young, Inf.

Canadian Force

- Sgt. A. J. Addy, Canadian Railway Troops
- Sgt. H. P. Allberry, Inf.
- Sgt. R. F. Allen, Engineers
- Sgt. H. A. Buckle, Inf.
- Sgt. W. H. Charlesworth, Canadian Railway Troops
- Sgt. D. Collins, Canadian Railway Troops
- Sgt. J. Craddock, Pioneer Battalion
- Sgt. Major E. B. Davies, Inf.
- Sgt. J. C. H. Davies, Engineers
- Cpl. H. W. Dawes, Canadian Sub-Staff, late Machine Gun Corps
- Sgt. W. H. Dean, Canadian Railway Troops
- Staff Sergeant R. Drummond, Army Service Corps
- Sgt. J. Duckworth, Inf.
- Act. Q.M.S. H. W. Dunk, Ordance Corps
- Sgt. Major P. G. Fairbrother, Cav.
- Sgt. Major J. Farmer, Canadian Sub Staff
- Sgt. W. H. Foote, Inf.
- Cpl. H. H. Goodall, Inf.
- Act. Sgt. Major S. W. Graham, Ordnance Corps
- Act. Cpl. J. Grier, Inf.
- Sgt. J. Harper, Inf.
- Staff Sergeant G. A. Harris, Army Service Corps
- Battery Sergeant Major E. Hineson, Arty.
- Q.M.S. H. G. Iliffe, Canadian Sub-Staff
- Staff Sergeant W. A. Jeffs, Cyclist Corps
- Pte. W. Johnson, Canadian Sub-Staff
- Cpl. C. Kennedy, Rly Troops
- Sgt. D. King, Canadian Railway Troops
- Sgt. Major C. E. Lamb, Canadian Sub-Staff
- Cpl. J. G. MacGregor, Labour Battalion
- Pte. W. M. MacLean, Canadian Railway Troops
- Cpl. R. McDonald, Canadian Railway Troops
- Act. Sgt. J. H. McKenzie, Canadian Forestry Corps
- Staff Sergeant J. Milroy, attd. Canadian General Base Depot
- Sgt. G. Morgan, Inf.
- Pte. L. G. Mounoe, Canadian Forestry Corps
- Cpl. D. R. Murray, Inf.
- Staff Sergeant H. Prior, Canadian Sub-Staff
- Staff Sergeant A. E. Ross, Army Service Corps
- Cpl. M. E. Rugg, Army Service Corps
- Sgt. K. S. Russell, Inf.
- Gnr. L. A. Shaver, Division Arty.
- C.S. Maj. W. R. Spencer, Engineers
- Q.M.S. D. H. Strutt, Inf.
- Staff Sergeant G. H. Taylor, Army Medical Corps
- Q.M.S. A. E. Tomlin, Canadian Sub-Staff
- Sgt. T. M. Turner, Inf.
- Staff Sergeant R. Webber, Canadian Railway Troops
- Battery Sergeant Major J. Whitts, Field Arty.

New Zealand Force

- Sgt. D. Cameron, Pioneers
- Sgt. S. S. Choate, Clerical Staff
- B.Q.M. Sgt. E. S. Colebrook, Rifle Brigade
- L. Cpl. S. V. Forrest, Auckland Reg.
- Sgt. G. H. Griffin, Wellington Reg.
- C.S. Maj. A. H. Guy, Canterbury Reg.
- Sgt. R. E. Hunt, Rifle Brigade
- Sgt. T. Jones, Auckland Reg.
- C.S. Maj. T. Kenna, Engineers
- Pte. J. G. Langrish, Rifle Brigade
- Staff Sergeant Major G. E. Lovell, Canterbury Reg.
- L. Cpl. J. Mercer, Rifle Brigade
- Staff Sergeant G. R. Robinson, New Zealand Medical Corps
- Cpl. L. Shaw, Rifle Brigade
- L. Cpl. T. Smith, Rifle Brigade
- Staff Sergeant H. L. Walden, Postal Service

South African Force

- Dvr. J. Bryant, Army Service Corps
- Dvr. C. N. Gabriel, Army Service Corps
- Dvr. P. G. Locker, Army Service Corps
- Sgt. C. McPherson, Inf.
- Sgt. H. Ritchie, Signal Company, Engineers
- Sgt. C. H. V. Sowden, Engineers

Indian Army

- Staff Sergeant J. R. Howey, Indian Miscellaneous List, attd. Indian Sec., General Headquarters
- Cond. E. V. Johnson, Indian Ordn. Dept.
- Far. Staff Sergeant S. Mills, Indian Subordnance Veterinary Dept.
- Sub Conductor E. T. Walsh, Supply and Transport Corps, attd. Lucknow CCS
- Staff Sergeant J. E. Walsh, Indian Miscellaneous List

== See also ==
- 1918 New Year Honours - Full list of awards.
