= Meritorious Service Medal (South Africa) =

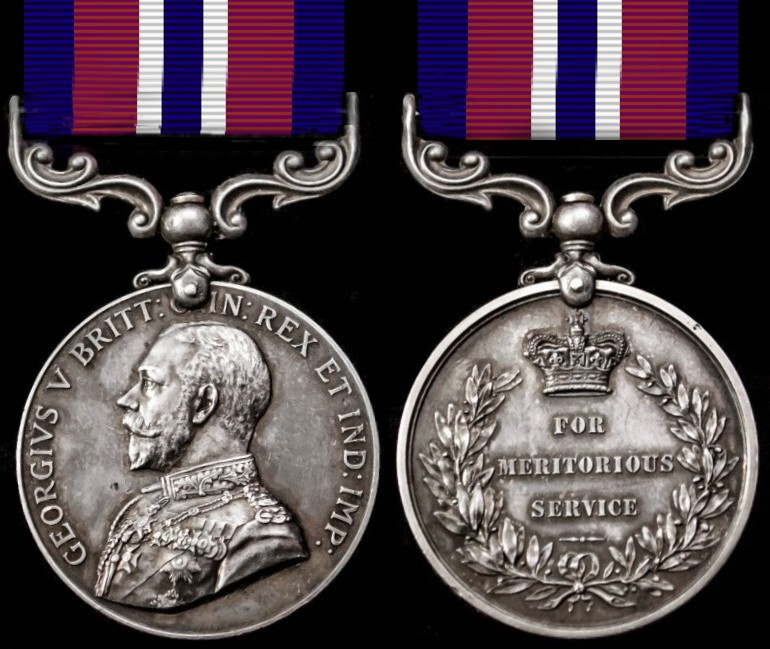
- Type: Military long and meritorious service medal
- Awarded for: 21 years meritorious service
- Country: Union of South Africa
- Presented by: the Monarch of the United Kingdom and the British Dominions, and Emperor of India
- Eligibility: Warrant officers and senior non-commissioned officers
- Status: Discontinued in 1940
- Established: 1914

Highlights
- Total: 46
- Ribbon bar

Order of wear
- Next (higher): Queen Elizabeth II's Long and Faithful Service Medal
- Equivalent: Meritorious Service Medal (United Kingdom); Meritorious Service Medal (Cape of Good Hope); Meritorious Service Medal (Natal); Meritorious Service Medal (New Zealand)
- Next (lower): Accumulated Campaign Service Medal

In May 1895, Queen Victoria authorised Colonial governments to adopt various British military medals and to award them to their local permanent military forces. The Cape of Good Hope and Colony of Natal instituted their own territorial versions of the Meritorious Service Medal in terms of this authority. These two medals remained in use in the respective territories until after the establishment of the Union of South Africa in 1910.

In 1914, the Meritorious Service Medal (South Africa) was instituted for the Union of South Africa, for award to selected senior non-commissioned officers of the Permanent Force of the newly established Union Defence Forces who had completed twenty-one years of meritorious service.

== Origin ==
The United Kingdom's Meritorious Service Medal was instituted by Queen Victoria on 19 December 1845 to recognise meritorious service by non-commissioned officers of the British Army. Recipients were also granted an annuity, the amount of which was based on rank.

After Queen Victoria authorised Dominion and Colonial governments on 31 May 1895 to adopt the Meritorious Service Medal, as well as the Distinguished Conduct Medal and the Army Long Service and Good Conduct Medal, and to award them to their local military forces, the Cape of Good Hope and Natal instituted their own versions of the Meritorious Service Medal.

Other territories which took advantage of the authorisation include Canada, India, New South Wales, New Zealand, Queensland, South Australia, Tasmania, Victoria and, from 1901, the Commonwealth of Australia.

== Union Defence Forces ==
The Union of South Africa was established on 31 May 1910 in terms of the South Africa Act, 1909, enacted by the Parliament of the United Kingdom. The Union Defence Forces were established in 1912 in terms of the Union Defence Act, no. 13 of 1912, enacted by the Parliament of the Union of South Africa.

== Adoption ==
The Meritorious Service Medal was adopted by the Union as the Meritorious Service Medal (South Africa) in 1914, but unlike the earlier Meritorious Service Medal (Cape of Good Hope) and Meritorious Service Medal (Natal), the name of the country was not inscribed on this medal's reverse. Instead, the South African medal is identical to the United Kingdom's Meritorious Service Medal, but with a ribbon exclusive to South Africa.

== Award criteria ==
Recipients of the Meritorious Service Medal (South Africa) were usually already holders of a long service and good conduct medal such as the Army Long Service and Good Conduct Medal (Cape of Good Hope), Army Long Service and Good Conduct Medal (Natal) or Permanent Forces of the Empire Beyond the Seas Medal. Until 1920, the award of the medal was coupled to a Meritorious Service Annuity. It could be awarded to selected warrant officers and senior non-commissioned officers of the Permanent Force who had completed twenty-one years of meritorious service.

The medal and annuity were awarded sparingly and only to selected candidates, usually upon retirement as a reward for long and valuable service, upon recommendation by their commanding officers and selected from a list by the Commander-in-Chief of the Union Defence Forces, the Governor-General of the Union of South Africa.

== Gallantry ==
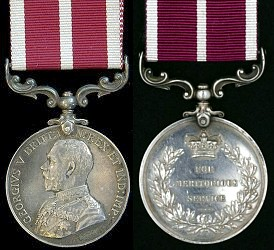
Meritorious Service Medal (United Kingdom), first King George V version

During the First World War, as approved by Royal Warrant on 4 October 1916, non-commissioned officers below the rank of Sergeant and men also became eligible for the award of the Meritorious Service Medal, without the annuity, for acts of gallantry in the performance of military duty, not necessarily on active service, or in saving or attempting to save the life of an officer or soldier. For acts of gallantry, however, only the Meritorious Service Medal (United Kingdom) was awarded, irrespective of the recipient's nationality, and recipients were entitled to use the post-nominal letters "MSM". A Bar to the medal was instituted by Royal Warrant on 23 November 1916, which could be awarded to holders of the Meritorious Service Medal for subsequent acts of gallantry.

== Order of wear ==
In the order of wear prescribed by the British Central Chancery of the Orders of Knighthood, the Meritorious Service Medal (South Africa) ranks on par with the Meritorious Service Medal (United Kingdom). It takes precedence after Queen Elizabeth II's Long and Faithful Service Medal and before the Accumulated Campaign Service Medal.

=== South Africa ===
With effect from 6 April 1952, when a new South African set of decorations and medals was instituted to replace the British awards used to date, the older British decorations and medals applicable to South Africa continued to be worn in the same order of precedence but, with the exception of the Victoria Cross, took precedence after all South African orders, decorations and medals awarded to South Africans on or after that date. Of the official British medals which were applicable to South Africans, the Meritorious Service Medal (South Africa) takes precedence as shown.

- Preceded by the Meritorious Service Medal (Natal).
- Succeeded by the Army Long Service and Good Conduct Medal (Cape of Good Hope).

== Description ==
The medal was struck in silver and is a disk, 36 millimetres in diameter and with a raised rim on both sides. The suspender is an ornamented scroll pattern swiveling type, affixed to the medal by means of a single-toe claw and a pin through the upper edge of the medal.

Obverse

The obverse has the effigy of King George V, bareheaded and in Field Marshal's uniform, and is inscribed "GEORGIVS V BRITT: OMN: REX ET IND: IMP:" around the perimeter.

Reverse

The reverse has the words "FOR MERITORIOUS SERVICE" in three lines, encircled by a laurel wreath and surmounted by the Imperial Crown.

Ribbon

The ribbon is 32 millimetres wide, with a 5 millimetre wide dark blue band, a 6½ millimetre wide crimson band and a 2½ millimetre wide white band, repeated in reverse order and separated by a 4 millimetre wide dark blue band.

== Discontinuation ==
The Meritorious Service Medal (South Africa) was awarded to only 46 individuals. Award of the medal was discontinued in 1940.
