= 1918 Birthday Honours (MSM) =

This is a list of Meritorious Service Medals (MSM) awarded in the 1918 Birthday Honours.

The 1918 Birthday Honours were appointments by King George V to various orders and honours to reward and highlight good works by citizens of the British Empire. The appointments were made to celebrate the official birthday of The King, and were published in The London Gazette in early June 1918.

The recipients of honours are displayed here as they were styled before their new honour, and arranged by honour, with classes (Knight, Knight Grand Cross, etc.) and then divisions (Military, Civil, etc.) as appropriate.

== Recipients of the Meritorious Service Medal (MSM) ==
Royal Air Force

- Flight Sergeant J. C. Alexander (Billericay, Essex)
- Flight Sergeant F. T. Angell (Crowthorne, Berks.)
- Corporal A. W. Ashbee (Keynsham, Bristol)
- Corporal R. E. Ashbolt (Ilford)
- Temp. Sergeant-Major C. W. Baker (Pewsey, Wilts.)
- Corporal W. N. Baldwin (Grimsargh, Lancs.)
- Flight Sergeant D. Barnett (Birkenhead)
- Sergeant J. W. Benson (Leeds)
- Temp. Sergeant-Major J. F. Bentley (Bow, London)
- Temp. Sergeant-Major J. F. Biggs (Isleworth)
- Temp. Sergeant-Major B. Billing (Bury St. Edmunds)
- Flight Sergeant S. F. Bonnett (Bedford)
- Sergeant G. H. Bowater (West Bromwich)
- Corporal R. W. Broom (Cromer)
- Corporal H. T. Brown (Fulham)
- Flight Sergeant R. C. Bruce (Bristol)
- 1st Air Mechanic G. E. Bryant (West Baling)
- 1st Air Mechanic H. Burman (Walthamstow)
- Temp. Sergeant Major B. C. Burnett (Enfield)
- Temp. Sergeant-Major H. Carrington (Norwich)
- Temp. Sergeant-Major C. S. Garden (Enfield)
- Flight Sergeant F. W. C. Catchpole (Maidstone)
- Temp. Sergeant-Major P. J. C. Clarke (Wallasey)
- Flight Sergeant J. E. Clifton (Birmingham)
- Sergeant H. Collins (Eastbourne)
- Temp. Sergeant-Major C. H. Cooper (Hammersmith)
- Temp. Sergeant-Major E. H. Cooper (Shoreham)
- Sergeant E. E. Copper (Beckenham, Kent)
- Temp. Sergeant-Major A. R. Cox (Gosport)
- Corporal H. W. Crawford (Redcar)
- Flight Sergeant A. Creighton (Lancaster)
- Corporal A. W. T. Davey (Highgate)
- Flight Sergeant R. Dickenson (Salford)
- Temp. Sergeant-Major W. Eccles (Stockport)
- Flight Sergeant W. H. Finch (Waltham Cross)
- Flight-Sergeant C. F. Ford (Chichester)
- Flight Sergeant F. G. Ford (Brixton)
- Sergeant A. Gibson (Maidstone)
- 1st Air Mechanic A. R. Gilbert (Kilburn)
- Temp. Sergeant-Major G. Gillman (Farnham)
- Corporal T. J. G. Grout (East Dulwich)
- Corporal R. A. R. Hill (King's Cross)
- Petty Officer Mechanic J. W. Hodgson (York)
- Temp. Sergeant-Major J. J. Hollyhead MM (Malvern)
- Sergeant A. H. M. Hoy (Winsley, Wilts.)
- Flight Sergeant S. E. Hughes (Tufnell Park, N.)
- Sergeant O. G. Hunter (Hendon)
- Temp. Sergeant-Major C, W. James (Plumstead)
- Sergeant-Major H. James, M.M. (Eltham, Kent)
- Temp. Sergeant-Major A. Jarman (Plumstead)
- Corporal M. D. Jones (Godrergraig, Glam.)
- Sergeant J. Kerr (Paisley)
- Flight Sergeant F. W. Kirby (Wortham, Suffolk)
- Flight Sergeant W. A. Legg (Cullen, Banff.shire)
- Corporal J. C. McMichael (Gatehouse. N.B.)
- Sergeant C. L. Marks (Lewisham)
- Flight Sergeant F. B. Matthews (Portsmouth)
- Flight Sergeant A. R. May (Plumstead)
- Temp. Sergeant-Major S. H. May (Folkestone)
- Flight Sergeant R. H. Millman (Lower Edmonton)
- Flight Sergeant A. S. Norman (Cove, Hants)
- 1st A. M. J. Needham (Alderley Edge, Cheshire)
- Temp. Sergeant-Major E. S. Olney (Willesden, N.W.)
- Temp. Sergeant-Major A. W. Osborne (Westcliff)
- Sergeant C. J. O'Toole (Dublin)
- 1st Air Mechanic S. Owen (Armedale, Midlothian)
- Temp. Sergeant-Major J. J. Pathe (Carrigalong Biss, Co. Tipperary)
- 1st Air Mechanic R. Peacock (Morecambe)
- Flight Sergeant L. Pellatt (Whitehaven, Cumberland)
- Corporal J. Phillips (Leeds)
- Corporal L. Poole (Leeds)
- Sergeant W. H. Roberts (Merthyr)
- Sergeant J. C. Robertson (West Hampstead)
- Temp. Sergeant-Major J. Robinson (Gillingham)
- Corporal P. Roche (Rochdale)
- Flight Sergeant S. C. Rogers (Highgate)
- Air Mechanic J. Rundle (Par, Cornwall)
- Flight Sergeant W. J. Ryman (Hersham, Surrey)
- Flight Sergeant S. J. Scott (Wandsworth)
- Flight Sergeant W. Scott (Dysart)
- 2nd Air Mechanic G. Shaylor (Hornsey)
- Flight Sergeant F. Shipman (Sheffield)
- Temp. Sergeant-Major J. H. Shone (Bangor)
- Temp. Sergeant-Major E. Smalley (Liverpool)
- 2nd Air Mechanic A. E. Smith (Reading)
- 1st Air Mechanic E. Stevens (Basingstoke)
- Flight Sergeant J. Stevenson (Stourbridge)
- Temp. Sergeant-Major H. L. Stidworthy (Edmonton)
- Corporal E. G. Strange (Wootton Bassett, Wilts)
- Corporal G. F. Surtees (Mill-on-Lyne)
- Corporal F. Swift (Bradford)
- Corporal A. Tarlington (Sparkbrook)
- Flight Sergeant G. Thorn (Alloa)
- Sergeant C. J. Thompson (London, W.)
- 1st Air Mechanic H. W. Triggs (Nunhead, S.E.)
- Chief Petty Officer William John Tuckwell (Henley-on-Thames)
- Flight Sergeant J. Waeland (Canning Town)
- Sergeant C. G. Ward (Rochester)
- Chief Petty Officer A. J. Wheeler (Felixstowe)
- Flight Sergeant A. Wilkinson (Manetester)
- Flight Sergeant F. W. Winter (Croydon)
- Sergeant G. H. Withers (Ripon)
- Flight Sergeant J. Wright (Glasgow)
- 1st Air Mechanic L. Wright (Woking).

In recognition of valuable services rendered with the Forces in Egypt—

- Sergeant A. Airlie, Royal Scots Fusiliers (Darvel)
- Sergeant W. S. Barton, Royal Horse Artillery (Holt)
- 2nd Captain W. T. K. Beedle, Army Ordnance Corps (Brockley)
- Sergeant W. G. Bloom, Army Service Corps (Hampstead)
- Private H. J. Bradford, Army Ordnance Corps (Bradford)
- Lance Corporal E. Brammer, Royal Engineers (Stoneycroft)
- Private A. J. Brooks, Army Ordnance Corps (Aldershot)
- Captain D. Carnegie, Army Service Corps (Brisbane)
- Captain W. G. Clarke, Royal Engineers (Peckham)
- Sergeant Major B. A. Collins, Royal Engineers (Hampton-in-Arden)
- J. Copeland, Royal Engineers (Bargeddie)
- Sergeant E. Evans, Imperial Camel Corps (E. London)
- Staff Sergeant T. Feigherty, Royal Engineers (Cordfin)
- Sergeant W. Foster, Royal Engineers (Ilford)
- Sergeant Major H. Frank, Royal Field Artillery (Manitoba)
- Private H. J. Garrett, Royal Army Medical Corps (Bristol)
- Sergeant D. Gibson, Royal Army Medical Corps (Stamford Hill)
- Sergeant J. Gibson, Military Mounted Police (Farnham)
- Mech. Staff Sergeant A. Gregson, Royal Engineers (Armley)
- Regimental Sergeant Major P. Hayes, Royal Irish Regiment (Co Cork)
- Sergeant Major A. J. Hickman, Liverpool Regiment (Alexandria)
- Sergeant T. J. Higginson, Army Service Corps (Preston)
- Sergeant Major B. R. Hill, Royal Engineers (Sandy)
- Captain G. Hines, Royal Engineers (Ashby-de-la-Zouch)
- Trooper L. E. Holman, Yeomanry (Brondesbury)
- Staff Sergeant W. P. Hopkinson, Army Service Corps (Battersea)
- Mech/Staff Sergeant J. Howie, Army Service Corps (Blairgowrie)
- Sergeant Major J. Hughes, Royal Engineers (Prestwick)
- Temp. Sub. Conductor H. G. F. Jagger, Army Ordnance Corps (Earls Court)
- Captain R. Kerr, Rifle Brigade (Glasgow)
- Wheeler Staff Sergeant James Cyril Sandall Kirton, Army Service Corps (Thrapston)
- Captain H. F. Lackford, Army Service Corps (Tooting)
- Temp. Regimental Sergeant Major W. Lambert, Essex Regiment, attd. Royal Air Force
- Temp. Sub.-Conductor J. J. Langrish, Army Ordnance Corps (Old Charlton)
- Sergeant L. A. MacDonald, Army Service Corps (St. Asaphs)
- Sergeant Major F. Marshall, Royal Garrison Artillery (Preston)
- Captain R. Matthews, Army Service Corps (Glasgow)
- Private M. McArthur, British West Indies Regiment (Jamaica)
- Sergeant E. J. Memory, Northumberland Fusiliers (Dover)
- Lance Corporal E. Murphy, Military Mounted Police (Bermondsey)
- Lance Captain A. Peachey, Military Mounted Police (Finsbury Park)
- Sergeant J. W. Playford, Army Service Corps (Ash Vale)
- Lance Corporal P. A. Pluck, Military Mounted Police (Charlton)
- Act. Captain E. Quinn, Machine Gun Corps (Levenshulme)
- Sergeant A. J. Squires, Royal Engineers (South Brint)
- Squadron Sergeant Major W. H. Steele, Lancers (Teignmouth)
- Quarter Master Sergeant R. Stocks, Royal Engineers (Auchtermuchty)
- Temp. Armament Sergeant Major J. H. Swinburne, Army Ordnance Corps (New Cross)
- Captain J. Tanner, Royal Engineers (Kingswood)
- Captain H. Thomas, Rifle Brigade (Radnorshire)
- Sergeant O. D. Thomas, Royal Engineers (Swansea)
- Mech/Sergeant Major W. H. Tilbury, Army Service Corps (Monmouth)
- Captain C. T. Tiller, Army Service Corps (St. Albans)
- Staff Quarter Master Sergeant W. J. Titmas, Army Service Corps (S. Africa)
- Sergeant A. E. Waight, Royal Army Medical Corps (Croydon)
- Sergeant W. D. Wallace, Royal Engineers (Dundee)
- Quarter Master Sergeant M. Ward, Royal Army Medical Corps (Belfast)
- Sergeant Major G. T. Watson, Rifle Brigade (Gateshead)
- Spr. T. H. Whitaker, Royal Engineers (Stoke Newington)
- Staff Sergeant Major D. White, Army Service Corps (Glasgow)
- Sergeant Major F. G. Wigginton, Royal Engineers (Portsmouth)
- Conductor A. E. Williams, Army Ordnance Corps (Deal)
- Temp. Supt. Clk. G. H. Williams, Royal Engineers (Gosport)

Australian Imperial Force

- Staff Sergeant C. L. Downe, Postal Corps
- Trooper H. Malcolm, Light Horse Regiment
- Sergeant R. Welsh, Infantry

New Zealand Force

- Staff Sergeant L. L. P. Brabant, Postal Services
- Squadron Sergeant Major V. J. McKibbin, Canterbury Mounted Rifles

Indian Army

- Sergeant R. G. Bruce, Indian Unattd. List
- Staff Sergeant P. E. Hartnoll, Indian Ordnance Department
- Staff Sergeant G. Lawrence, Indian Misc. List

In recognition of valuable services rendered with the Forces in Italy

- Regimental Quartermaster-Sergeant A. E. Adams, King's Royal Rifle Corps (Herne Hill)
- Sergeant R. S. Adams, Middlesex Regiment (Holloway)
- Sergeant L. W. Adsetts, Army Service Corps (Doncaster)
- Company Sergeant Master E. T. Ash, Machine Gun Corps (Hampstead Heath)
- Staff Quartermaster-Sergeant J. F. Atkinson, Army Service Corps (Witley)
- Corporal A. Banks, Royal Field Artillery (Keighley)
- Corporal J. T. Barry, Durham Light Infantry (Gateshead)
- Battery Sergeant Master K. A. W. Bartlett, Royal Field Artillery (Southampton)
- Sergeant A. Barton, Machine Gun Corps (Selkirk)
- Private J. C. Bartram, Nottinghamshire & Derbyshire Regiment (Bonsall)
- Colonel Sergeant W. Bartram, Norfolk Regiment (Wymondham)
- Company Sergeant Master C. H. Batho, Devonshire Regiment (Jersey)
- Sergeant H. Battson, Royal Field Artillery (Rugby)
- Corporal H. S. Beaton, Royal Engineers (Chester)
- Sergeant T, A. S. Berry, Royal Garrison Artillery
- Sergeant P. V. Bessell, Devonshire Regiment (London, N.E.)
- Sergeant S. Birks, Royal Field Artillery (Buckley)
- Private W. Black, York and Lancaster Regiment (Kirkconnell)
- Private H. Blackford, Worcestershire Regiment (Redditch)
- Regimental Quartermaster-Sergeant A. H. Bolton, Yorikshire Regiment (London, W.)
- Company Sergeant Master F. Borman, Middlesex Regiment (Hanwell)
- Private F. G. Bradley, Devonshire Regiment (Wellingboro)
- Company Quartermaster-Sergeant A. Bradshaw, Manchester Regiment (Manchester)
- Corporal W. Bray, Machine Gun Corps (Chiswick)
- Sergeant A. V. Brazier, King's Royal Rifle Corps (Brondesbury Park)
- Sergeant W. Brennand, Army Service Corps (Merton)
- Corporal E. S. Britten, Army Service Corps (W. Norwood)
- Corporal W. Brocklehurst, Manchester Regiment (Hayfield)
- Corporal A. Brooker, Royal Horse Artillery (Brighton)
- Sergeant J. D. Brown, Royal Engineers (Hebburu)
- Sergeant W. H. Brown, Royal Field Artillery (Llanelly)
- Sergeant A. Buckey, Royal Field Artillery (London)
- Regimental Quartermaster-Sergeant J. J. Burford, Oxfordshire & Buckinghamshire Light Infantry (Witney)
- Sergeant G. R. Burnell, Royal Engineers (Bermondsey)
- Company Quartermaster-Sergeant H. D. Burnet, Royal Engineers (Birkenhead)
- Sergeant M. Busfield, West Riding Regiment (Parsley)
- Company Sergeant Master A. W. Cannon, Royal Warwickshire Regiment (London, W.C.)
- Sergeant J. Casson, Army Service Corps (Wigan)
- Corporal A. F. Cattell, R. War, Regiment (Birmingham)
- Sapper J. W. Cavan, Royal Engineers (Glasgow)
- Driver F. Christopher, Royal Field Artillery (Fulham)
- Regimental Sergeant Master C. S. Clarke, Royal Warwickshire Regiment (Birmingham)
- Company Sergeant Master E. Comport, Army Service Corps (Bootle)
- Sergeant E. Oook, Yorkshire Regiment (Holloway)
- Quartermaster-Sergeant G. P. Cooper, Machine Gun Corps. (Worcester)
- Sergeant H. J. Cooper, Cavalry (Sutton-on-Sea)
- Sergeant J. Cooper, Army Service Corps (Old (Trafford)
- Sergeant H. Copps, Royal Horse Artillery (N. Finchley)
- Sergeant G. E. Corke, Worcestershire Regiment (Tenbury)
- Staff Sergeant E. Cosier, Army Service Corps (Romf ord)
- Sergeant P. E. Cbwley, Northumberland Fusiliers (Sheffield)
- Company Quartermaster-Sergeant C. Cudby, Royal Warwickshire Regiment (London, N.)
- Corporal T. S. Currey, King's Royal Rifle Corps (Sherburn)
- Sergeant J. Dale, King's Royal Rifle Corps (Helmsley)
- Sergeant S. J. Dale, Royal West Surrey Regiment (Woking)
- Private C. H. Dalwood, Glou. Regiment, attd. Trench Mortar Battery (Bristol)
- Lance Corporal H. C. Dark, Glou. Regiment (Westonsuper-Mare)
- Temp Sergeant Major H. Davey, Devonshire Regiment (Exeter)
- Driver D. Davies, Royal Field Artillery (Swansea)
- Bombardier A. G.W. Day, Royal Field Artillery (Bristol)
- Company Quartermaster-Sergeant A. C. Denham, Royal Warwickshire Regiment (Birmingham)
- Sergeant C. C. Dennis, Royal Warwickshire Regiment (Hereford)
- Sergeant T. Devereaux, Royal Engineers (Birmingham)
- Sergeant H. T. Dibley, Royal Engineers (Fluthing). P
- Sergeant J. R. Dixon, Military Mounted Police (Durham)
- Sergeant J. Donnachie, Lab. Corps (Glasgow)
- Regimental Quartermaster-Sergeant A. J. Down, Royal Welsh Fusiliers (Newport)
- Gunner A. Drewett, Royal Field Artillery (London, W.)
- Staff Sergeant Major L. A. Dudley, Army Service Corps (Kidderminster)
- Corporal S. Easey, Army Service Corps Royal Garrison Artillery (Woolwich)
- Gunner G. G. Eden, Royal Field Artillery (Tuckenhay)
- Driver A. Ellis, Army Service Corps (New Brunswick)
- Mech. Staff Sergeant H. W. Ellis, Army Service Corps (Hammersmith)
- Quartermaster-Sergeant L. S. Ellis, Royal Army Medical Corps (Brighton)
- Sergeant F. English, East Surrey Regiment (Putney)
- Corporal A. L. Evans, Army Service Corps (Forest Gate)
- Private J. Evans, Army Service Corps (London, S.W.)
- Private A. Farmer, Royal West Kent Regiment (Dutton)
- Company Sergeant Master E. Fears, Royal Engineers (Seaford)
- Staff Sergeant Major J. Fellows, Army Service Corps (Birmingham)
- Lance Corporal A. Fieldhouse, West Yorkshire Regiment (Normariton)
- Company Quartermaster-Sergeant F. Fleming, King's Own Scottish Borderers (Berwick)
- Company Quartermaster-Sergeant A. Forbes, Monmouthshire Regiment, attd. British West Indies Regiment (Monmouth)
- Private L. G. Fowler, Army Service Corps, attd. Royal Army Medical Corps (Kingston upon Thames)
- Sergeant W. H. Fraiser, Royal West Kent Regiment (Lewisham)
- Sergeant A. T. Gardiner, Army Service Corps (Bexhill)
- Squadron Sergeant Master W. B. Garner, Yeomanry (Northampton)
- Corporal A. B. Gibson, Royal West Kent Regiment (Southborough)
- Corporal C. Giles, Royal Field Artillery (Sunderlarrd)
- Company Quartermaster-Sergeant W. K. Gillard, Duke of Cornwall's Light Infantry (Pennycomequick)
- Private H. L. Goddard, Army Service Corps (London, N.W.)
- Lance Corporal J. Goggins, Royal Garrison Artillery (Queenstown) 0
- Sergeant C. G. H. Gold, Border Regiment (Cheapside, E.C.)
- Corporal H. Good, Royal Warwickshire Regiment (Wylde Green)
- Corporal W. Gorman, Royal Artillery (Dover)
- Company Sergeant Master J. W. Graham, Nottinghamshire & Derbyshire Regiment (Kentish Town)
- Sergeant R. A. Greenbury, Yorkshire Light Infantry (Leeds)
- Regimental Sergeant Master F. Greenwood MC Hampshire Regiment (Portsmouth)
- M. Sergeant Master C. J. P. Greggains, Army Service Corps (London, E.)
- Company Quartermaster-Sergeant R. P. Grove, Royal Warwickshire Regiment (Birmingham)
- Sergeant F. R. Grover, Royal Berkshire Regiment (Reading)
- Staff Quartermaster-Sergeant E. H. Hall, Army Service Corps (Sparkbrook)
- Sergeant H. Hall, West Yorkshire Regiment (Leeds)
- Sergeant T. S. Hammond, Durham Light Infantry (Durham)
- Corporal G. Hannington, Royal Field Artillery (Hackney)
- Sergeant J. Hardie, Gordon Highlanders (Bucksburn)
- Sergeant H. H. Hards, Royal ArtilleryM.Q. (London, N.W.)
- Sergeant W. H. Harris, Royal Field Artillery (Plumstead)
- Private D. A. Hart, Royal Army Medical Corps (London, E.)
- Company Quartermaster-Sergeant H. Harvey, Royal Warwickshire Regiment (Birmingham)
- Company Quartermaster-Sergeant E. S. Hatton, Royal Berkshire Regiment (Windsor)
- Sergeant J. Hawkesworth, Middlesex Regiment (Fenton)
- Sergeant W. Heap, Manchester Regiment (Manchester)
- Staff Sergeant W. Henser, Royal Army Medical Corps (Stoke)
- Company Sergeant Master A. J. Herridge, Royal Fusiliers (Norbiton)
- Company Quartermaster-Sergeant C. H. Hiam, South Staffordshire Regiment (Carlton)
- Corporal W. Higgins, Middlesex Regiment (Islington)
- Sergeant F. Hill, Manchester Regiment (Oldham)
- Sergeant T.I. Holden, Manchester Regiment (Stockport)
- Corporal P. S. Howard, Royal Field Artillery (Lewes)
- Bombardier J. S. Hurst, Royal Field Artillery (Nova Scotia)
- Private H. J. Ing. Army Service Corps (Tottenham)
- Sergeant H. C. Ingle, Army Service Corps (Aldershot)
- Temp Regimental Sergeant Major A. James, Army Corps of Clerks (Tonypandy)
- Sergeant W. Jeynes, Oxfordshire & Buckinghamshire Light Infantry (Oxford)
- Regimental Q.M. Sergeant W. L. Johnson, Royal West Kent Regiment (Broadwater)
- Sergeant H. V. Jones, Gloucestershire Regiment (Gloucester)
- Private G. Keen, Royal Warwickshire Regiment (Lutterworth)
- Private J. Killeen, Durham Light Infantry (Dipton)
- Private A. Kirsop, Durham Light Infantry (Blaydon)
- Company Sergeant Master F. A. Larkius, Border Regiment (Leicester)
- Sergeant C. Latham, Royal Warwickshire Regiment (Coventry)
- Company Sergeant Master J. Lawrence, Devonshire Regiment (Camberwell)
- Gunner V. T. Laycock, Royal Field Artillery (Skipton)
- Sergeant H. Lee, Royal Warwickshire Regiment (Birmingham)
- Private J. H. Lidbury, Royal West Kent Regiment (East Greenwich)
- Sergeant H. Locke, Royal Engineers (Edinburgh)
- 2nd Corporal H. A. Long, Royal Engineers (Barnsley)
- Sergeant W. Lucock, R. War, R (Birmingham)
- Sergeant F. H. Marriott, Machine Gun Corps (Rugby)
- Staff Sergeant G. Martin, Royal Army Medical Corps (Broadstairs)
- Staff Sergeant Major N. McDonnell, Army Service Corps (Fulham)
- Sergeant W. McGill, Northumberland Fusiliers (Broxburn)
- Gunner J. McGregor, Royal Field Artillery (Arbroath)
- Company Sergeant Master T. McGuckin, Northumberland Fusiliers (Teams)
- Sergeant P. McHale, Royal Warwickshire Regiment (Birmingham)
- Sergeant J. C. McHarg, Royal Field Artillery (Glasgow)
- Lance Corporal W. R. McLean, Border Regiment, attd. Traffic Control (Douglas)
- Sergeant J. Mcnamara, Middlesex Regiment (Rockferry)
- Company Quartermaster-Sergeant F. J. McPoland, Machine Gun Corps, Liverpool)
- 2nd Corporal F. S. McQueen, Royal Engineers (Chatham)
- Company Quartermaster-Sergeant W. J. W. Melton, Royal West Surrey Regiment (Hurlingham)
- Battery Sergeant Master W. Miller, Royal Garrison Artillery (E Dundee)
- Company Sergeant Master W. Mills, Argyll & Sutherland Highlanders
- Temp S. Sergeant Master L. V. Moore, Army Service Corps (Bristol)
- 2nd Corporal C. R. Morgan, Royal Engineers (Bishops Waltham)
- Sergeant G. Morgan, Royal Fusiliers (Preston)
- Corporal A. F. Morrell, Royal Army Medical Corps (Fulham)
- Sergeant H. A. Morris, Military Mounted Police (Sheerness)
- Company W. Muirhead, Royal Engineers (Peckham)
- Corporal R. Murphy, Royal Field Artillery (Cumberland)
- Lance Corporal H. Musselwhite, King's Royal Rifle Corps (Cherry Burton)
- Private W. Naugher, Durham Light Infantry (Sunderland)
- Sergeant G. Nuttman, East Surrey Regiment (Tooting)
- Sergeant J. Oakley, Worcestershire Regiment (Dudley)
- Sergeant H. J. Pallett, Honourable Artillery Company (Stevenage)
- Sergeant J. Palmer, Royal Sussex Regiment (Mayfield)
- Sergeant W. Pattison, Durham Light Infantry (Springwell)
- Sergeant H. C. Perkins, Royal Engineers (Brislington)
- Sergeant G. Perks, Lab. Corps (Worcester)
- Corporal G. Perry, Gloucestershire Regiment (Gloucester)
- Sergeant H. A. Petty, Royal Field Artillery (London)
- Sergeant S. A. Peyton, Royal Army Medical Corps (Reading)
- Sergeant A. S. Platts, South Staffordshire Regiment (Barsby)
- Private W. H. Pointon, Royal Army Medical Corps (Featherstone)
- Sergeant A. J. Potts, King's Royal Rifle Corps (Derby)
- Sergeant S. Pretty, Machine Gun Corps (Paddington)
- Temp Sub-Conductor G. Pritchard, Army Ordnance Corps (Ecclesall)
- Sergeant F. C. Puxty, Royal Sussex Regiment (Flimwell)
- Company Sergeant Master H. Quick, King's Own Scottish Borderers (Bastings)
- Sergeant G. H. Randall, Gloucestershire Regiment (Bristol)
- Sergeant Master T. Rayner DCM Royal Engineers (Wallingford)
- Regimental Sergeant Master A. Reynolds MC Royal West Kent Regiment (Hove)
- Private H. Reynolds, Army Service Corps, attd. Royal Army Medical Corps (Durley Botley)
- Sergeant W. A. Robertson, Royal Army Medical Corps (Glasgow)
- Sergeant G. Rogers, Border Regiment (Luton)
- Sergeant F. Rothwell, Royal Engineers (Reading)
- Driver W. Ryan, Royal Field Artillery (Limerick)
- Whir. Corporal E. J. Saddler, Army Service Corps (Blaydon-on-Tyne)
- Company Sergeant Master W. H. Sainsbury, Royal Engineers (Bristol)
- Private H. W. Saunders, Border Regiment (Camden Town)
- Corporal S. H. Scholes, Royal Engineers (Liverpool)
- Sergeant S. G. Searson, Middlesex Regiment (Fulham)
- Staff Sergeant W. F. Sercombe, H.Q. Army Service Corps (Clevedon)
- Sergeant J. Sheldon, Royal Field Artillery (Hemsworth)
- Sergeant A. Smith DCM Cheshire Regiment (Winsford)
- Sergeant A. Smith, Cheshire Regiment (Preston)
- Company Sergeant Master A. A. Smith, Northumberland Fusiliers, attd. British West Indies Regiment (Peckham)
- Company Quartermaster-Sergeant S. F. Smith, Royal Fusiliers (St. Pancras)
- Sergeant R. Smyth MM Royal Garrison Artillery (Grove Road, S.W.)
- Private W. J. C. Solomon, Royal Warwickshire Regiment (Birmingham)
- Corporal E. T. J. Spalding, Bedfordshire Regiment (Woodbridge)
- Private F. Speed, Machine Gun Corps (Annfield Plain)
- Sergeant A. Speight MM Machine Gun Corps (Hulme)
- Regimental Quartermaster-Sergeant N. Speller, East Surrey Regiment Chelmsford)
- Temp Sub-Conductor H. G. S. Spreadbury, Army Ordnance Corps (Plumstead)
- Corporal W. Steele, Army Service Corps (Kirkfieldbank)
- Quartermaster-Sergeant A. H. Stemp, Royal Army Medical Corps (Little Bromwich)
- Temp Sub-Conductor A. E. Stone, Army Ordnance Corps (Ruardean)
- Sergeant W. J. Straiton, Manchester Regiment (Knutsford)
- Sergeant R. J. Symons, Royal West Surrey Regiment (Hendon)
- Acting Sergeant W. H. Taylor, Manchester Regiment (Manchester)
- Staff Smith Corporal W. Thomas, Royal Engineers (Brampton Brian)
- Staff Sergeant J. S. Thompson, Army Service Corps (Earlston)
- Sergeant W. C. Tompkins, Royal Field Artillery (London, E.)
- Battery Quartermaster-Sergeant H. Tranter, Royal Field Artillery (Kidderminster)
- Company Quartermaster-Sergeant H. A. Treagus, Hampshire Regiment (Southsea)
- Sergeant J. Trufitt, Royal West Kent Regiment (Margate)
- Lance Corporal F. C. Tuck, Royal Engineers (Cirencester)
- Sergeant W. Turner, East Surrey Regiment (Kingston upon Thames)
- Bombardier T. Turvey, Royal Field Artillery (Kidderminster)
- Sergeant J. Twitchett, Army Service Corps (Stroud)
- Sergeant J. Veitch, Durham Light Infantry (Sunderland)
- Staff Sergeant F. W. G. Waghorne, Royal Army Medical Corps (Wembley)
- Sergeant H. Walker, Durham Light Infantry (Sheriff Hill)
- Battery Sergeant Master F. J. West, Royal Field Artillery (Birmingham)
- Sergeant G. F. Wliyley, Royal Warwickshire Regiment (Birmingham)
- Sergeant J. R. Wilcox, Glou. Regiment (Thornbury)
- Private H. Williams, Army Veterinary Corps (London)
- Sergeant H. J. Williams, Royal Engineers (Handsworth)
- Lance Corporal R. L. Williams, Royal Engineers (Ruabon)
- Private A. J. Wise, Army Veterinary Corps (London).
- Company Quartermaster-Sergeant J. W. Woodfield, Royal Warwickshire Regiment (Warwick)
- Company Sergeant Master F. Witts, Royal West Surrey Regiment
- Corporal B. Worfolk, Royal Engineers (Rutland Street) (Hucknall)
- Sergeant A. W. Zipfel, Norfolk Regiment (Norwich)

For distinguished services in connection with Military Operations with the British Forces in Salonika —

- Lance Corporal Charles Darling Abethell, Royal Engineers (Dublin)
- Sergeant Major A. Allen, Royal Highlanders (Kensington)
- Sergeant Major E. Andrews, South Wales Borderers (Pembroke Dock)
- Farrier Quarter Master Sergeant E. A. Anniss, Royal Field Artillery (Otterton)
- Gunner H. L. Avery, Royal Field Artillery (Brighton)
- Sergeant J. Bailey, South Lancashire Regiment (Salford)
- Sergeant G. Baker, Royal Field Artillery (Birmingham)
- Sergeant H. A. Balding, Royal Engineers (Farnborough)
- Private A. B. Barr, Yeomanry (Galashiels)
- Sergeant Major W. Batley, Royal Garrison Artillery (Canterbury)
- Quarter Master Sergeant E. Baverstock, Royal Engineers (Guildford)
- Quarter Master Sergeant A. B. Beck, Royal Engineers (Gorey, Jersey)
- Sergeant L. H. Belben, Army Ordnance Corps (Yeovil)
- Sergeant G. F. Bodle, Army Ordnance Corps (New Maiden)
- Captain P. H. Bonnard, Royal Engineers (Surbiton)
- Captain E. J. Border, Royal Engineers (Southsea)
- Sergeant Major A. Bostock, Royal Field Artillery (Cork)
- Private G. E. Box, Royal Army Medical Corps (Chatham)
- Sergeant A. E. Branscombe, Royal Field Artillery (Rayleigh)
- Private A. E. Brown, Royal Army Medical Corps (Anfield)
- Sergeant J. Browning, Royal Engineers (Box, Wiltshire)
- Sergeant W. J. Buckingham, Royal Engineers (Teignmouth)
- Company Quarter Master Sergeant W. Buckland, Royal Engineers (Bolton)
- Battery Sergeant Major L. Burden, Royal Field Artillery (Itchington)
- Captain W. Burnett, Liverpool Regiment (Sheffield)
- Sergeant G. E. Burrell, Royal Engineers (Redcar, Yorkshire)
- Regimental Sergeant Major W. Butler, South Lancashire Regiment (Woolwich)
- Quarter Master Sergeant W. J. Butters, Middlesex Regiment (E. Hounslow)
- Sergeant J. B. Candler, Duke of Cornwall's Light Infantry (Bury St. Edmunds)
- Captain J. Carlin, Royal Scots (Edinburgh)
- Sergeant J. Carmen, Welsh Regiment (Stockwell)
- Captain G. W. Carpenter, Worcestershire Regiment (Oldbury)
- Armament Staff Sergeant F. J. Challoner, Army Ordnance Corps (Clapham Common)
- Quarter Master Sergeant T. J. Chance, Labour Corps (Harrow Rd., London)
- Sergeant C. Chilton, Yorkshire Light Infantry (Watford)
- Sergeant Major H. Clarke, Worcestershire Regiment (Birmingham)
- Quarter Master Sergeant M. Clarke, York and Lancaster Regiment (Sheffield)
- 5arr. Sergeant R. Clarke, Royal Field Artillery (Wood Green)
- Sergeant W. H. Clements, Gloucestershire Regiment (Bristol)
- Sergeant H. Cooper, Royal Engineers (Edinburgh)
- Temp. Staff Sergeant Major A. A. L. Coulson, Army Service Corps (Hoxton, N.)
- Staff Sergeant Major A. P. Creedon, Royal Lancaster Regiment (Petersfield)
- Sergeant L. C. Cumming, Army Service Corps (Regents Park, N.W.)
- Sergeant W. Davidson, Army Service Corps (Remount Service) (Hull)
- Private E. J. Davies, Welsh Regiment (Canton, Cardiff)
- Quarter Master Sergeant F. Dawes, Oxfordshire and Buckinghamshire Light Infantry (Herstmonceux)
- Sergeant Major A. Day, Middlesex Regiment (Tottenham, N.)
- Quarter Master Sergeant A. Dix, South Wales Borderers (Cardiff)
- Captain E. W. Dobson, Royal Engineers (Portsmouth)
- Sergeant F. H. Donn, Royal Engineers (Fareham)
- Sergeant A. A. Dormer, Royal Berkshire Regiment (South Hackney)
- Sergeant Major S. R. Drake, Royal Field Artillery (Reading)
- Sergeant Major G. Draper, Cam. Highrs (Woking)
- Quarter Master Sergeant W. A. A. Durrant, Machine Gun Corps (Brondesbury)
- Sergeant D. T. Edwards, Royal Field Artillery (Pontygwaith)
- Quarter Master Sergeant G. Fairs, Royal Field Artillery (Ramsgate)
- Sergeant Major B. W. Faithorn, Shropshire Light Infantry (Small Heath)
- Sergeant C. J. Fale, Royal Engineers (Bath)
- Wheeler Captain H. Fearby, Royal Field Artillery (Doncaster)
- Mech. Staff Sergeant W. Fillingham, Army Service Corps (Wigan)
- Sergeant Major A. E. Fleckner, Oxfordshire and Buckinghamshire Light Infantry (Oxford)
- Sergeant A. Ford, Royal Engineers (Gosport)
- Staff Sergeant T. W. Fox, Army Service Corps (Cardiff)
- Sergeant Major L. J. Foyle, Royal Engineers (Southsea)
- Temp. Sergeant Major H. G. Freeman, Royal Army Medical Corps (Kingston)
- Private G. W. Gambles, Yeomanry (Leeds)
- 2nd Captain H. J. Gerald, Royal Engineers (Manor Park, E.)
- Sergeant Major W. G. Giddings, Royal Scots Fusiliers (Clapton)
- Driver W. H. Glenn, Royal Garrison Artillery (Bromley-by-Bow)
- Sergeant Major J. Gray, Durham Light Infantry (Gateshead)
- Sergeant T. Greenwood, Machine Gun Corps (Lincoln)
- Company Quarter Master Sergeant W. H. Gregson, East Lancashire Regiment (Blackburn)
- Quarter Master Sergeant L. A. Hack, Royal Lancaster Regiment (Sydenham)
- Sergeant Major W. Hardiman, East Surrey Regiment (Dublin)
- Sergeant H. W. Hart, Army Service Corps (Sunningdale)
- Staff Sergeant H. Hartley, Army Service Corps (Leeds)
- Sergeant Major L. Hayes, Royal Army Medical Corps (Kew)
- Sergeant Major A. Hayward, Liverpool Regiment (late Border Regiment) (Bedford)
- Sergeant Major A. Higgins, Royal Field Artillery (Byker, Newcastle upon Tyne)
- Quarter Master Sergeant R. S. Holman, Royal Engineers (Yeovil)
- Sergeant Major C. W. Holt DCM Royal Army Medical Corps (Dundalk)
- Sergeant G. C. Holyoake, Royal Engineers (Kentish Town)
- Mech. Sergeant Major H. B. Ives, Army Service Corps (Tufnell Park)
- Sergeant Major S. Jacob, Royal Army Medical Corps (Moseley)
- Sergeant Major J. C. Johnston, Royal Engineers (Edinburgh)
- Sergeant D. Joiner, Labour Corps (Tobermore, County Londonderry)
- Captain G. S. Jolley, Royal Field Artillery (Tottenham)
- Regimental Quarter Master Sergeant A. H. Jones, Gloucestershire Regiment (Watlington)
- Captain F. Jones, Army Service Corps (Pontypridd)
- Private Henry George Kanard, Army Service Corps (Denmark Hill)
- Quarter Master Sergeant A. Kenworthy, King's Royal Rifle Corps (Low Cudworth)
- Staff M D. G. Kinden, Army Service Corps (Rugby)
- Captain W. Lawley, Hampshire Regiment (Kidderminster)
- Private E. G. LeStrange, Royal Army Medical Corps (Hastings)
- Quarter Master Sergeant T. Liddell, Royal Army Medical Corps (Shirebrook)
- Sergeant A. Liggitt, Duke of Cornwall's Light Infantry (Winson Green)
- Staff Sergeant Major T. Linden, Army Service Corps (Liverpool)
- Sergeant D. Linford, Liverpool Regiment (Ormsirk)
- Quarter Master Sergeant L. Littell, Royal Field Artillery (Catford, S.E.)
- Sergeant Major T. Lodge, Royal Field Artillery (Stoke Cannon)
- Sergeant Major E. F. Lord, Army Service Corps (Plymouth)
- Company Quarter Master Sergeant J. Lloyd, Oxfordshire and Buckinghamshire Light Infantry (Wolverton)
- Captain C. MacDonald, Machine Gun Corps (Balnahanait)
- Sergeant Major A. J. Magee, Royal Army Medical Corps (Craghead)
- Captain R. G. Marsh, Royal Engineers (Stroud Green)
- Sergeant W. J. Maskrey, Royal Army Medical Corps (Kingston upon Thames)
- Staff SmithS. Mason, Army Veterinary Corps (Morecambe)
- Sergeant Major G. Mauchlen, Royal Engineers (Newcastle)
- Captain G. W. J. H. McArthur, Royal Engineers (Killingham)
- Sergeant D. McCarthy, Royal Engineers (Axminsfcer)
- Sergeant Major M. McKendrick, Sea. Highrs (Fort George, Inverness)
- Sergeant W. McManus, Manchester Regiment (Salford)
- Captain E. McNamara, Army Veterinary Corps (Woolwich)
- Lance Corporal F. Michailides, Military Mounted Police (Cyprus)
- Sergeant Major J. H. Miller, Rifle Brigade (S. Kensington)
- Sergeant Major J. Milnes, King's Royal Rifle Corps (Bradford)
- Staff Sergeant Major. G. Mouser, Army Service Corps (Ipswich)
- Act. Wheeler Corporal A. Moir, Army Service Corps (Carnisbay)
- Lance Corporal J. J. Morris, Royal Engineers (Aldershot)
- Quarter Master Sergeant P. Morrison, Lancashire Fusiliers (Stockport)
- Act. Sergeant Major A. E. Murrell, Army Ordnance Corps (Shoeburyness)
- Sergeant Major E. A. Nanburgh, East Yorkshire Regiment (Lowestoft)
- Staff Sergeant Major O. F. Nelson, Army Service Corps (Easingwold)
- Sergeant F. Newman, Hampshire Regiment (Oxford, near Basingstoke)
- Sergeant W. S. Newton, Cheshire Regiment (Stockport)
- Captain E. Nish, Royal Scots Fusiliers (Stranraer)
- Sergeant Major A. O'Connor, Labour Corps (Lymington)
- Gunner T. O'Donovan, Royal Garrison Artillery (Enniskean)
- Private D. Owen, Royal Welsh Fusiliers (Mountain Ash)
- Private Howard Buckley Pryce Owen, Royal Army Medical Corps (Mitcham)
- Private F. R. Panichelli, Royal Army Medical Corps (Hammersmith)
- Staff Sergeant G. E. Parcell, Army Service Corps (Doncaster)
- Captain J. Parkes, Royal Engineers (Haywards Heath)
- Gunner A. J. Payne, Royal Field Artillery (Orsett Heath)
- Lance Corporal F. J. Pearce, Military Foot Police (Barnstaple)
- Staff Sergeant A. Philip, Army Service Corps (Monifieth)
- Sergeant R. Phillips, Royal Engineers (Tunbridge Wells)
- Company Sergeant Major M. Plomer, King's Royal Rifle Corps (Aldershot)
- 2nd Captain W. J. Plumb, Royal Engineers (Coventry)
- Quarter Master Sergeant G. E. Poole, Shropshire Light Infantry (Wellington, Salop)
- Sergeant S. Pritchard, Border Regiment (Sunderland)
- Sergeant J. W. Quirk, Royal Garrison Artillery (Chelsea)
- Conductor C. M. Rice, Army Ordnance Corps (Clapham)
- Staff Quarter Master Sergeant J. Race, Army Service Corps (Bow, Devon)
- Staff Smith A. W. Riggs, Army Veterinary Corps (Evercreech)
- Sergeant J. Rammer, Liverpool Regiment (Freshfield)
- Parr. Staff Sergeant George Frank Riste, Royal Field Artillery (Bedhampton)
- Sergeant R. T. Robinson, Royal Lancaster Regiment (Askam-in-Furness)
- Bombardier H. J. Rolph, Royal Garrison Artillery (Mile End)
- Bombardier J. Routledge, Royal Garrison Artillery (Whitehaven)
- Private E. E. Russell, Army Veterinary Corps (Winchester)
- Sergeant J. D. Rutherford, Bord. A (Brandon)
- Sergeant J. Scott, Yeomanry (New Maiden)
- Sergeant Major H. Seeker, Royal Army Medical Corps (Glasgow)
- Sergeant Major A. A. Setterfield, Royal Field Artillery (Broadstairs)
- Temp. Staff Sergeant Major W. Sharp, Army Service Corps (Luton)
- Sergeant A. E. Simmons, Royal Engineers (Winton, Dorset)
- Sergeant Major J. Simpson, Royal Field Artillery ("E" Clonnel)
- Sergeant G. Sinclair, Cam. Highrs (Struy, near Beauly)
- Quarter Master Sergeant J. G. Sinclair, Royal Army Medical Corps (Finsbury Park)
- Sergeant H. J. Smith, Royal Engineers (Cheltenham)
- Private J. Soutter, Royal Highlanders (Edinburgh)
- Lance Corporal W. G. Stanbrook, Royal Army Medical Corps (Southend, near Reading)
- Sergeant J. Stear, Devonshire Regiment (Plymouth)
- Sergeant Major W. V. Stenner, Gloucestershire Regiment (Bristol)
- Captain W. Stephenson, Royal Army Medical Corps (Willington)
- Staff Sergeant Major G. H. Button, Army Service Corps (Churchover, near Rugby)
- Armament Staff Sergeant Major G. W. Taylor, Army Ordnance Corps (Kingston upon Thames)
- Sergeant Major F. C. Thorley, Yorkshire Light Infantry (Hull)
- Sergeant G. W. Thornton, Royal Field Artillery (Kennington)
- Sergeant Major S. G. Tilbrook, Labour Corps (Grimsby)
- Sergeant R. S. Todd, Royal Army Medical Corps (Blaydon)
- Staff Sergeant W. Tomlinson, Army Service Corps (Kettering)
- Regimental Sergeant Major J. Tripp, Royal Irish Fusiliers (Dublin)
- Lance Corporal P. F. Tucker, Army Ordnance Corps (Southampton)
- Sergeant Major W. H. Wallace, Royal Engineers (Liverpool)
- Foreman of Works Sergeant Major G. A. Walsh, Royal Engineers (Bristol)
- Sergeant Major E. Ward, Royal Field Artillery (Gateshead)
- Sergeant E. T. Waterman, Royal Field Artillery (Woolwich)
- Lance Corporal R. A. Weary, Military Mounted Police (Bodmin)
- Regimental Quarter Master Sergeant W. Whitbread, Hampshire Regiment (Stratford)
- Sergeant G. White, Royal Garrison Artillery (Plympton)
- Sergeant H. C. White, Royal Army Medical Corps (Hastings)
- Sergeant G. M. Wilkinson, Royal Engineers (Peckham, S.E.)
- Sergeant A. J. Williams, Royal Engineers (Knighton)
- Sergeant A. J. Williams, Shropshire Light Infantry (Shrewsbury)
- Quarter Master Sergeant F. M. Williams, Royal Field Artillery (Morpeth)
- Sergeant P. C. Winstone, Royal Field Artillery (Bauston)
- Farrier Staff Sergeant E. J. Witcher, Royal Field Artillery (Fareham)
- Corporal A. Wolfenden, Army Service Corps (Manchester)
- Act. Sergeant T. Wordsworth, Army Service Corps (Brixton)
- Regimental Quarter Master Sergeant C. W. Wood, Devonshire Regiment
- Fitter Staff Sergeant R. E. Wood, Royal Field Artillery (Rodley, Leeds)
- Sergeant Major H. Wright, Royal Garrison Artillery (E Hampton, London)

Indian Army

- Conductor J. H. Maul

In recognition of valuable services rendered with the British Forces on the Mediterranean Line of Communications —

- Staff Sergeant J. G. Eves, Royal Army Medical Corps (Whitehall)
- Staff Quarter Master Sergeant R. R. Frost, Army Service Corps (Slough)
- Superintendent Clerk W. J. R. Craig, Royal Engineers (Willesden)

South African Force

- Lance Corporal H. A. Barends, Labour Regiment
- Regimental Sergeant Major A. Roxburgh, Labour Regiment

In recognition of valuable services rendered in Russia —

- Sergeant D. M. Alexander, Royal Garrison Artillery (E Dover)
- Act. Sergeant Wilfred Alfred Michael Doll, Royal Garrison Artillery (E Dover)
- Act. Staff Sergeant F. Joseph, Army Ordnance Corps (Newton-le-Willows)

== See also ==
- 1918 Birthday Honours - Full list of awards.
