= New Zealand Defence Meritorious Service Medal =

- Ribbon bar of the medal
- Awarded for: Meritorious exceptional performance, commitment, or innovation.
- Country: New Zealand
- Eligibility: All military and civilian personnel of the New Zealand Defence Force
- Status: Currently awarded
- Established: 15 October 2013

Highlights
- Total awarded posthumously: Yes

Order of Wear
- Next (higher): New Zealand Meritorious Service Medal
- Next (lower): New Zealand Police Meritorious Service Medal

The New Zealand Defence Meritorious Service Medal is a military award of the New Zealand Defence Force (NZDF). Established by Royal Warrant 15 October 2013, the medal may be awarded to recognize meritorious exceptional performance, commitment, or innovation. Military and civilian personnel of the NZDF are eligible for this award regardless of rank or time in service. It will supersede the New Zealand Meritorious Service Medal.

== Appearance ==
The New Zealand Defence Meritorious Service Medal is made of silver and circular in shape. The obverse of the medal bears the effigy of the Sovereign, currently the effigy designed by Ian Rank-Broadley, surrounded by the Royal Styles and Titles for New Zealand. The reverse bears the inscriptions FOR MERITORIOUS SERVICE and HE TOHU HIRANGA surrounded by a wreath of fern fronds surmounted by St Edward's Crown. The medal was designed by the New Zealand Herald of Arms, Phillip O’Shea CNZM LVO. O’Shea has designed many of the New Zealand awards created since 1973.

The medal is suspended from crimson ribbon, 32 millimetres (1.3 in) wide, with three central stripes of white, green, and white with two narrow yellow stripes at the edges. Crimson has served as the ribbon color of long service and merit awards, starting with the Army Long Service and Good Conduct Medal in 1830. In 1887, a distinctive New Zealand award the New Zealand Long and Efficient Service Medal utilised a crimson ribbon with two white centre stripes. The imperial Meritorious Service Medal for New Zealand and the subsequent 1985 New Zealand Meritorious Service Medal also used a crimson ribbon, but with a green centre stripe. The ribbon of the New Zealand Defence Meritorious Service Medal integrates the green centre stripe, flanked by two white stripes recalling the history of and linking this medal to the awards that came before. The yellow edge stripes represent achievement or brilliance.

Subsequent awards of the medal will be depicted by bars made of silver and silver-gilt bearing a single fern frond. In undress, when a service ribbon is worn alone, a small silver rosette may be worn on the ribbon for each of the first three bars awarded. When a fourth bar is awarded, the silver rosettes are replaced by a silver-gilt rosette. An additional silver-gilt rosette is worn for each subsequent bar conferred.
