= Meritorious Service Medal (Natal) =

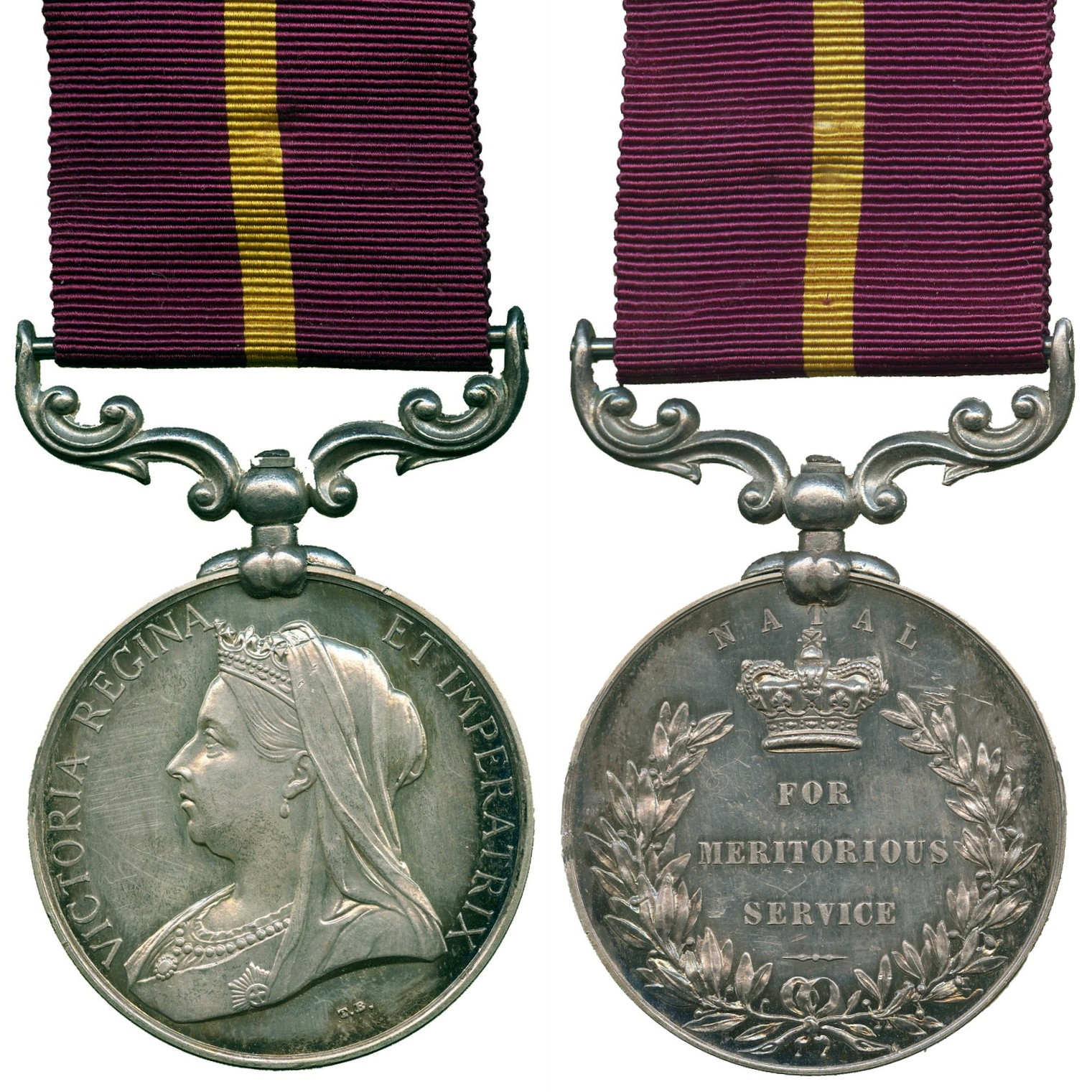
- Type: Military long service medal
- Awarded for: 21 years meritorious service
- Country: Colony of Natal
- Presented by: the Monarch of the United Kingdom of Great Britain and Ireland, and Empress of India
- Eligibility: Warrant officers and senior non-commissioned officers
- Status: Discontinued in 1913
- Established: 1897
- Ribbon Bar

Order of wear
- Next (higher): Queen Elizabeth II's Long and Faithful Service Medal
- Equivalent: Meritorious Service Medal (United Kingdom); Meritorious Service Medal (Cape of Good Hope); Meritorious Service Medal (New Zealand); Meritorious Service Medal (South Africa)
- Next (lower): Accumulated Campaign Service Medal

In May 1895, Queen Victoria authorised Colonial governments to adopt various British military medals and to award them to members of their local permanent military forces. The Colony of Natal introduced this system in August 1895 and, in 1897, instituted the Meritorious Service Medal (Natal).

The medal is a distinctive Colonial version of the British Meritorious Service Medal. It was coupled to a Meritorious Service Annuity and was awarded in limited numbers, usually upon retirement, to selected warrant officers and senior non-commissioned officers of the Natal Police who had completed twenty-one years of meritorious service.

== Origin ==
The United Kingdom's Meritorious Service Medal was instituted by Queen Victoria on 19 December 1845 to recognise meritorious service by senior non-commissioned officers of the British Army. The medal was initially only awarded to sergeants but, on 10 June 1884, eligibility was extended to all soldiers above the rank of Corporal. Recipients were also granted a Meritorious Service Annuity, the amount of which was based on rank.

Upon its institution in 1845, a sum of £2,000 of public money was made available annually to grant Meritorious Service Annuities of £20 each to sergeants of the Regular Army as a reward for good, faithful and efficient service. This allowed for a maximum of 100 British Army soldiers to be in receipt of the annuity at any time and, since those selected to receive the annuity were also awarded the Meritorious Service Medal, the medal was awarded sparingly. Even though the budgeted amount for these annuities was increased from time to time, further awards of the medal and annuity were therefore restricted to only those registered candidates, recommended by their commanding officers, who were selected by the Commander-in-Chief of the Army from a list as those whom he considered to be the most deserving to receive any annuities which may have fallen vacant.

== Natal Colonial Forces ==
In the late 19th century, the military forces of the Colony of Natal consisted of the para-military Natal Police and a Volunteer Force, which was reorganised as the Natal Militia in 1904. The Natal Police and Natal Militia were amalgamated to form the Natal Colonial Forces in 1908.

== Adoption ==
On 31 May 1895, Queen Victoria authorised Dominion and Colonial governments to adopt the Meritorious Service Medal, as well as the Distinguished Conduct Medal and the Army Long Service and Good Conduct Medal, and to award them to permanent members of their local military forces. The Colony of Natal introduced this system in August 1895 and the Meritorious Service Medal (Natal) was instituted by Royal Warrant on 19 October 1897.

The Natal medal was identical to the British medal on the obverse, but had the additional inscription "NATAL" on the reverse. Other territories which took advantage of the authorisation include Canada, Cape of Good Hope, India, New South Wales, New Zealand, Queensland, South Australia, Tasmania, Victoria and, from 1901, the Commonwealth of Australia. Second versions of most of these medals, with the effigy of King Edward VII on the obverse, were introduced after his succession to the throne in 1901.

== Award criteria ==
Recipients of the Meritorious Service Medal (Natal) were usually already holders of the Army Long Service and Good Conduct Medal (Natal). The medal and annuity were awarded only to selected candidates, usually upon retirement as a reward after long and valuable service, upon recommendation by their commanding officers and selected from a list by the Commander-in-Chief of the Natal Colonial Forces, the Governor of the Colony of Natal.

== Order of wear ==
In the order of wear prescribed by the British Central Chancery of the Orders of Knighthood, the Meritorious Service Medal (Natal) ranks on par with the United Kingdom's Meritorious Service Medal. It takes precedence after Queen Elizabeth II's Long and Faithful Service Medal and before the Accumulated Campaign Service Medal.

=== South Africa ===
With effect from 6 April 1952, when a new South African set of decorations and medals was instituted to replace the British awards used to date, the older British decorations and medals applicable to South Africa continued to be worn in the same order of precedence but, with the exception of the Victoria Cross, took precedence after all South African orders, decorations and medals awarded to South Africans on or after that date. Of the official British medals which were applicable to South Africans, the Meritorious Service Medal (Natal) takes precedence as shown.

- Preceded by the Meritorious Service Medal (Cape of Good Hope).
- Succeeded by the Meritorious Service Medal (South Africa).

== Description ==
The medal was struck in silver and is a disk, 36 millimetres in diameter and with a raised rim on both sides. The suspender is an ornamented scroll pattern swiveling type, affixed to the medal by means of a claw and a horizontal pin through the upper edge of the medal. On the Queen Victoria version the suspender mount is a double-toe claw, while the King Edward VII version has a single-toe claw.

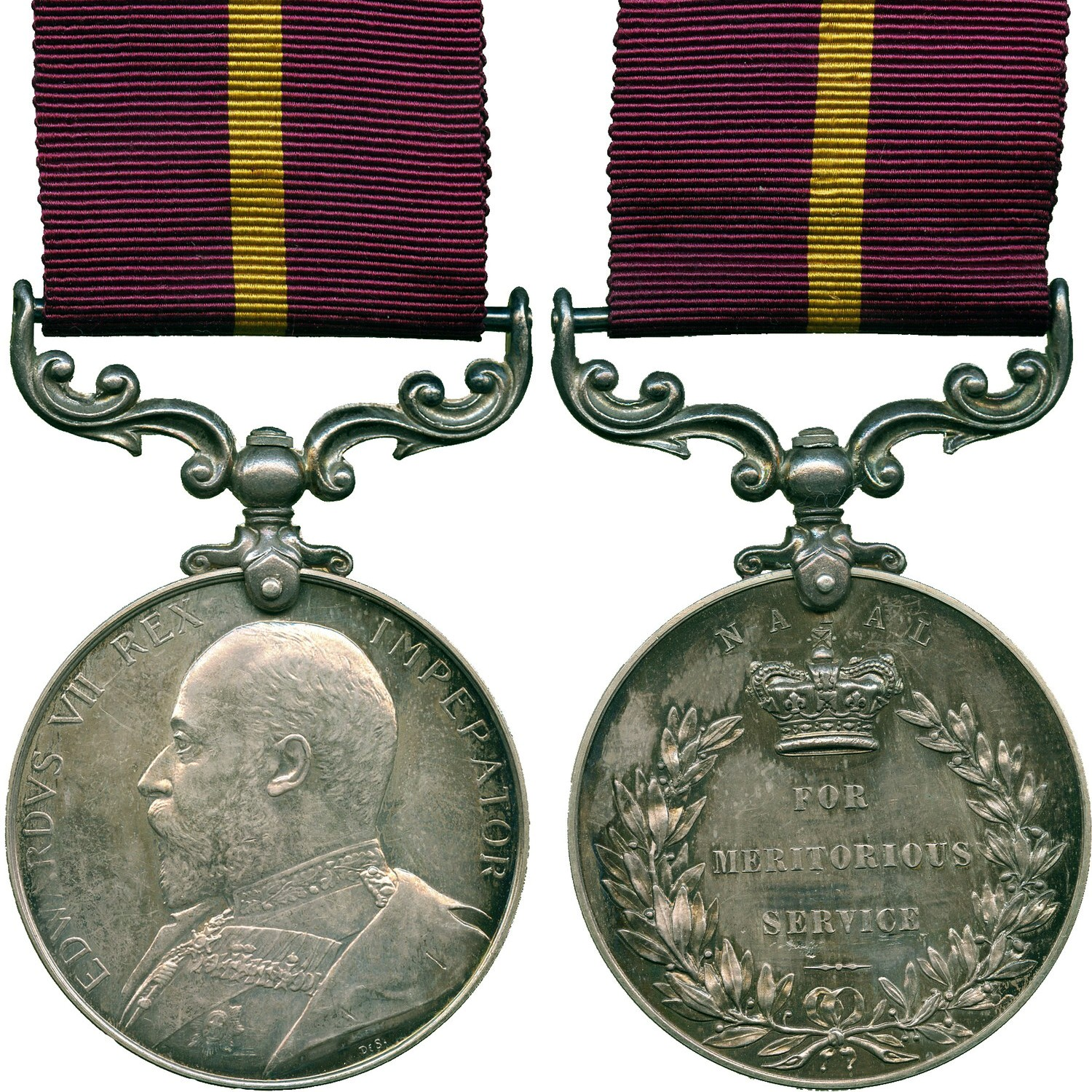
King Edward VII version

Obverse

The obverse of the first version of the medal bears the effigy of Queen Victoria, circumscribed "VICTORIA REGINA ET IMPERATRIX". The King Edward VII version has the effigy of the King in Field Marshal's uniform, circumscribed "EDWARDVS VII REX IMPERATOR".

Reverse

The reverse of both versions have the words "FOR MERITORIOUS SERVICE" in three lines, encircled by a laurel wreath and surmounted by the Imperial Crown. At the top, above the crown and wreath, it is inscribed "NATAL" in a curved line.

Ribbon

The ribbon is that of the Army Long Service and Good Conduct Medal (Natal). While the ribbon of the British Meritorious Service Medal was plain crimson until mid-1916, the ribbon of the Natal medal is 32 millimetres wide and crimson, with a 4 millimetres wide light yellow band in the centre.

== Discontinuation ==
Of the four Colonies which were to form the Union of South Africa in 1910, the Cape of Good Hope and the Colony of Natal adopted their own territorial versions of the Meritorious Service Medal. The award of these medals was discontinued after the Union of South Africa was established in 1910. Once the Union Defence Forces were established in 1912, the Union began to award the Meritorious Service Medal (South Africa).
