= Indian Meritorious Service Medal (for Indian Army) =

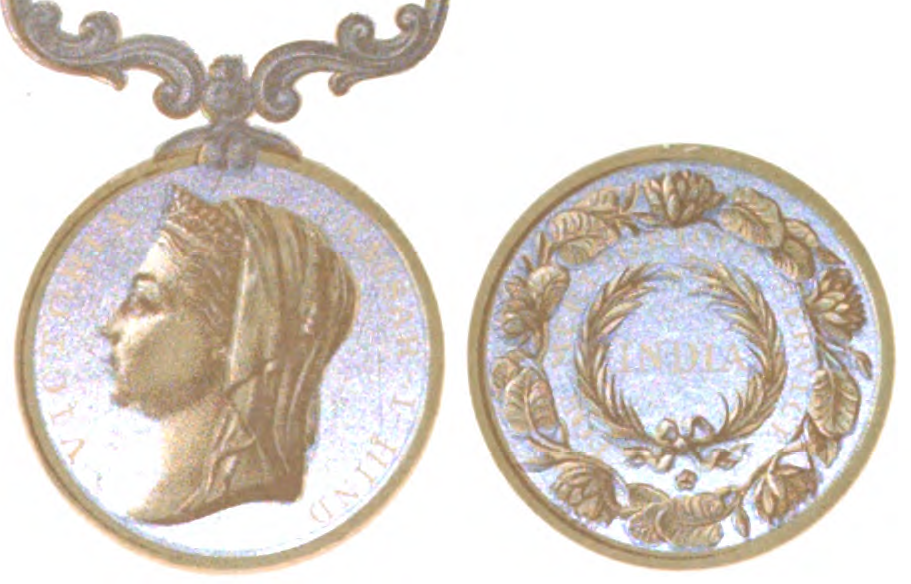
- Obverse and reverse of Victoria version of the medal
- Type: Long and meritorious service medal
- Awarded for: Long and meritorious service
- Presented by: British Raj
- Eligibility: Indians in the British Indian Army
- Status: No longer awarded
- Established: 1888
- Final award: 1947
- First version of ribbon Later version of the ribbon

Order of Wear
- Next (higher): Royal West African Frontier Force Long Service and Good Conduct Medal
- Next (lower): Police Long Service and Good Conduct Medal
- Related: Indian Long Service and Good Conduct Medal (for Indian Army)

The Indian Meritorious Service Medal (for Indian Army) was a long and meritorious service medal awarded to Indian non-commissioned officers in the British Indian Army.

== History ==
Established on 27 July 1888, the Indian Meritorious Service Medal could be awarded to one Daffadar or Havildar of each of the regiments of the Presidency armies. To be awarded the medal men must have served at least 18 years and had performed in a meritorious manner, with no courts-martial, and having been entered in the defaulters book fewer than five times. He must also have been recommended by his commanding officer. Recipients of the Indian Meritorious Service Medal had to surrender any previously awarded Indian Long Service and Good Conduct Medal.

== Appearance ==
The Indian Meritorious Service Medal is a circular silver medal 1.4 inches in diameter, designed by L.C. Wyon. The obverse depicts the effigy of the reigning sovereign. Around the edge is the inscription of the sovereign's regnal name and the title KAISAR-I-HIND. The reverse depicts an outer wreath of lotus flowers and leaves surrounding an inner wreath of palm leaves. Between the two wreaths is the inscription FOR MERITORIOUS SERVICE. Inside the inner wreath is the word INDIA.

== Works cited ==
- Mayo, John Horsley (1897). Medals and Decorations of the British Army and Navy, Volume 2. London: A. Constable.
- Steward, William Augustus (1915). War Medals and Their History. London: Stanley Paul & Company. p. 845.
