= Meritorious Service Medal (Australia) =

Australian Army medal awarded until 1975

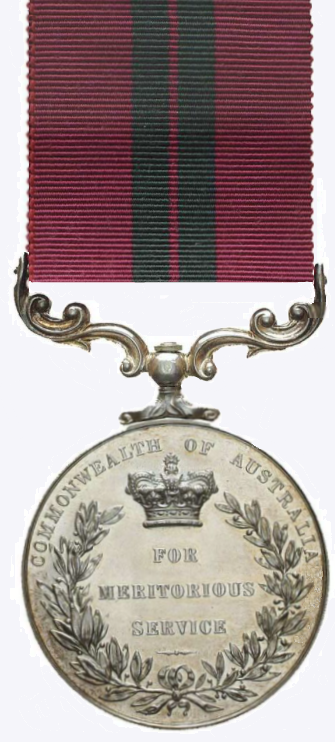
- Common reverse, 1903–1975
- Type: Service medal
- Awarded for: 22 years meritorious service in the Australian Army
- Country: Australia
- Presented by: Commonwealth of Australia
- Eligibility: Warrant officers, NCOs and other ranks
- Post-nominals: None
- Status: Superseded by the National Medal
- Established: 1902
- First award: 1903
- Final award: 1975
- Ribbon bar

Precedence
- Equivalent: Meritorious Service Medal (United Kingdom)

The Australian Meritorious Service Medal (1903–75) was awarded to warrant officers, non-commissioned officers and other ranks who had completed 22 years meritorious service with Australian Military Forces, and who had previously received the Army Long Service and Good Conduct Medal.

== History ==
=== Medal for long service (1903–75) ===
The Meritorious Service Medal was originally established in 1845 as a British decoration to reward army warrant officers and sergeants for long and meritorious service. Eligibility was extended in 1895 to local permanent forces in various parts of the British Empire, including the Australian colonies of New South Wales, Queensland, South Australia, Tasmania and Victoria. Each of these medals had a similar design, but was inscribed with the name of the colony on its reverse and had its own distinct ribbon. After the 1901 Federation of Australia, these medals were replaced by a common Australian version, first awarded in 1903.

The medal ceased to be awarded in 1975, when all Imperial long service awards were replaced by the Australian National Medal.

The medal is silver, with the reigning sovereign's profile on the obverse. The reverse has a small crown above a wreath surrounding the inscription 'FOR MERITORIOUS SERVICE, with 'COMMONWEALTH OF AUSTRALIA' above the crown. The medal is suspended from a crimson ribbon with two central dark green stripes.

=== Medal for gallantry or valuable service (1916–28) ===
In 1916 the award criteria for the medal were widened by the UK authorities to include immediate awards for non-operational gallantry or valuable service connected with the war effort. Australian forces were awarded approximately 1,222 Meritorious Service Medals on this basis, including 32 for gallantry. In 1928 this version of the medal ceased to be awarded.

Awards made for gallantry or valuable service were of the standard British type, without the words 'COMMONWEALTH OF AUSTRALIA' on the reverse, and with a crimson ribbon with a narrow white stripe at each edge and in the centre.
