= Meritorious Service Medal (United Kingdom) =

British military decoration

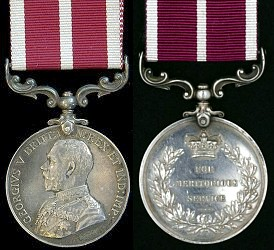
- First King George V version
- Type: Military medal
- Awarded for: Meritorious service by those military members who are of irreproachable character with at least 20 years of service and already hold the Long Service and Good Conduct Medal of their service
- Presented by: The United Kingdom
- Eligibility: Warrant officers and non-commissioned officers above the rank of corporal, or equivalent, who have served in the Royal Navy, Royal Marines, Regular Army or Royal Air Force.
- Post-nominals: None
- Status: Currently awarded
- Established: Army 1845; Marines 1849; Air Force 1918; Navy 1919
- Ribbon bar of the Army, Navy, Marine and RAF (current) medal Ribbon bar of the Air Force medal (1918–1928)

Precedence
- Next (higher): Royal Household Long and Faithful Service Medal
- Next (lower): Accumulated Campaign Service Medal

The Meritorious Service Medal is a British medal awarded to Senior Non Commissioned Officers and Warrant Officers of the British armed forces for long and meritorious service. From 1916 to 1928, eligibility was extended to cover both valuable services by selected other ranks irrespective of length of service, and for gallantry not in the face of the enemy.

Eligibility was widened in December 1977, with the medal now awarded on the same basis to all arms of the British armed forces.

== History ==
The Meritorious Service Medal was instituted on 19 December 1845 for the British Army, to recognise long and meritorious service by warrant officers and non-commissioned officers of the rank of sergeant and above, with a small number of early awards bestowed for gallantry. Recipients were granted an annuity, the amount of which was based on rank.

The first woman to be awarded the medal was Warrant Officer Marion Dickson Mackay, Women's Royal Army Corps, in 1966.

=== First World War ===
During the First World War, as approved by Royal Warrant on 4 October 1916, non-commissioned officers below the rank of Sergeant and men became eligible for the immediate award of the Meritorious Service Medal, without annuity, for valuable services. A further amending warrant on 3 January 1917 confirmed that the medal could be awarded for acts of gallantry in the performance of military duty, not necessarily on active service, or in saving or attempting to save the life of an officer or soldier. For acts of gallantry, however, only the Meritorious Service Medal (United Kingdom) was awarded, irrespective of the recipient's nationality, and not one of the various versions awarded by the Dominions. A clasp to the Meritorious Service Medal was instituted by Royal Warrant on 23 November 1916, that could be awarded to holders of the medal for subsequent acts of gallantry, but not for further long or other valuable service. Seven clasps were awarded.

Five members of the Chinese Labour Corps received the medal for their service during the war, including First Class Ganger Yen Teng Feng who, after an explosion at a depot, spent four hours drenching unexploded stacks of ammunition with water.

Awards for gallantry ceased after 7 September 1928, as they were honoured by the Empire Gallantry Medal, with the medal reverting to its original purpose of rewarding long and meritorious service in the army.

=== Royal Navy and Royal Marines ===
The medal for Royal Marines was instituted in 1849, and awarded on the same basis as the army medal. As a gallantry medal, it was awarded six times, until superseded by the Naval Conspicuous Gallantry Medal in 1874. As with the Army, from 1916 NCOs of the Royal Marines could receive the medal for valuable service in the field. Awards were discontinued in 1928.

The Royal Navy's medal was instituted in 1919, for gallantry not in the face of the enemy and for meritorious service by petty officers and senior naval ratings. It was not awarded after 1928 and was superseded by the Empire Gallantry Medal and the British Empire Medal.

For awards up to 1928, Royal Navy and Marine recipients were, by custom, allowed to use the letters MSM after their name.

Since 1977, the medal has resumed as an award for long and meritorious service by senior petty officers and NCOs in the Royal Navy, Royal Marines and the Queen Alexandra's Royal Naval Nursing Service.

=== Royal Air Force ===
The Royal Air Force version of the medal was instituted in 1918, for meritorious service not involving flight. It was superseded in 1928 by the Empire Gallantry Medal and the British Empire Medal. Awards of the medal began again in 1977 using the same criteria as the Army.

=== The Dominions ===
Meritorious Service Medals were previously awarded by a number of the Dominions, on a similar basis as the British award. These include Australia, Canada, India, New Zealand and South Africa.

== Current criteria ==
Following historic variations between the medals awarded in each of the armed forces, including slight differences in design and in the criteria for the award, the same medal has, since 1977, been issued for all of the services. To be awarded the MSM, an individual must have "good, faithful, valuable and meritorious service, with conduct judged to be irreproachable throughout". Other ranks must have at least twenty years' service, must already hold Long Service and Good Conduct Medals, and for the Army and the Royal Air Force must have reached the equivalent rank of sergeant. Officers of any service can also be considered for the medal immediately after being commissioned, provided they meet the other criteria.

The number of MSMs awarded is limited: no more than fifty-one a year may be awarded in the Royal Navy and Royal Marines combined, eighty-nine in the Army and sixty in the Royal Air Force, and in practice these numbers are not reached.

== Design ==
The medal is silver and has the sovereign's profile on the obverse, on the reverse a small crown and a wreath surrounding the inscription For Meritorious Service. The recipient's name, rank and unit are inscribed on the rim. If a sovereign is shown in naval uniform, then the medal was awarded for service at sea or with a Naval or Royal Marines unit on land. The obverse design varied by monarch, with George V having at least three effigy variations, while George VI had variations in legend.

Queen Victoria
An effigy of the young Queen Victoria wearing a diadem, facing left. Legend: VICTORIA REGINA
King Edward VII
An effigy of the King in Field Marshal's uniform, facing left. Legend: EDWARDVS VII REX IMPERATOR
King George V
An effigy of the King in Field Marshal's uniform, facing left. Legend: GEORGIVS V BRITT : OMN : REX ET IND : IMP :
King George V
A crowned coinage effigy, facing left. Legend: GEORGIVS * V * D * G * BRITT * OMN REX * ET * INDIAE * IMP *
King George VI
A bareheaded effigy, facing left. One of two legends: GEORGIVS VI D : G : BR : OMN :REX ET INDIAE IMP: or GEORGIVS VI DEI GRA; BRITT :OMN : REX FID : DEF :
Queen Elizabeth II
A bareheaded effigy of the Queen, facing right. Legend: ELIZABETH II DEI GRATIA REGINA

King Charles III

A bareheaded effigy of the King, facing right. Legend: CHARLES III DEI GRATIA REX FID DEF

=== Ribbon ===
The medal's ribbon has had various colours:

- Army, 1845–1916: crimson
- Army, 1916–1917: crimson with white edges
- Army, 1917–: crimson with white edges and a white centre stripe
- Royal Navy: crimson with white edges and a white centre stripe
- Royal Marines: dark blue
- Royal Marines (award in the field, 1916–1919): crimson with white edges and a white centre stripe
- Royal Air Force, 1918–1928: half blue half crimson with white edges and a white centre stripe
- Royal Air Force, 1977–: crimson with white edges and a white centre stripe

== See also ==
- Meritorious Service Medal (Australia)
- Meritorious Service Medal (Cape of Good Hope)
- Meritorious Service Medal (India)
- Meritorious Service Medal (Natal)
- Meritorious Service Medal (New Zealand)
- Meritorious Service Medal (South Africa)
- Meritorious Service Medal (United States)
- British and Commonwealth orders and decorations
