= Meritorious Service Medal (New Zealand) =

New Zealand Defence Force award

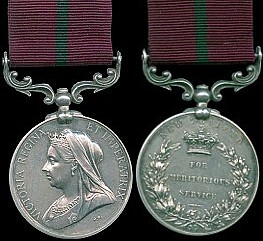
- Queen Victoria version
- Type: Medal for long service and meritorious service
- Awarded for: Twenty one years of long and meritorious service
- Country: New Zealand
- Presented by: the Monarch of the United Kingdom of Great Britain and Ireland, and Empress of India
- Eligibility: Warrant Officers and Senior Non-Commissioned Officers of the New Zealand Defence Force
- Status: To be superseded by the New Zealand Defence Meritorious Service Medal
- Established: 28 April 1898
- Ribbon bar

Precedence
- Next (higher): New Zealand Suffrage Centennial Medal
- Equivalent: Meritorious Service Medal (United Kingdom); Meritorious Service Medal (Cape of Good Hope)
- Next (lower): New Zealand Armed Forces Award

The New Zealand Meritorious Service Medal is a meritorious and long service award for members of the New Zealand Defence Force. Initially established on 28 April 1898 as the Meritorious Service Medal (New Zealand), only members of the New Zealand Army were eligible for award. In 1985, a Royal Warrant established the current criteria for the medal making all members of the Army, Navy, and Air Force eligible for the award. Members of the defence forces above the rank of sergeant, who have at least 21 years of service, and hold their service's Long Service and Good Conduct Medal are eligible for the medal. The New Zealand Meritorious Service Medal is to be replaced by the New Zealand Defence Meritorious Service Medal, though holders of the superseded medal are still entitled to continue wearing it.

== Appearance ==
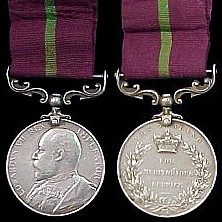
King Edward VII version

The medal is silver and circular in shape. The obverse bears the effigy of the Sovereign of New Zealand, surrounded by the inscription ELIZABETH II DEI GRATIA REGINA FID. DEF. The reverse bears the inscription For Meritorious Service surrounded by a laurel wreath, surmounted by a royal crown. Above the crown is the inscription New Zealand.

The medal is suspended by a ribbon, 32 mm in width, of crimson with a narrow centre stripe of green.
