= Long Service and Good Conduct Medal =

Long Service and Good Conduct Medal is a service medal awarded to personnel in various branches of the armed forces of the United Kingdom and the territories that are or were at some point a part of the British Empire or Commonwealth of Nations.

Examples include:

United Kingdom

- Army Long Service and Good Conduct Medal (British Army)
- Medal for Long Service and Good Conduct (Military) (British Army)
- Naval Long Service and Good Conduct Medal (1830) (Royal Navy and Royal Marines)
- Naval Long Service and Good Conduct Medal (1848) (Royal Navy and Royal Marines)
- Royal Air Force Long Service and Good Conduct Medal (Royal Air Force)
- Special Reserve Long Service and Good Conduct Medal
- Volunteer Long Service Medal
- Volunteer Officers' Decoration (VD)

Colonies and Dominions of the British Empire

- Army Long Service and Good Conduct Medal (Cape of Good Hope)
- Army Long Service and Good Conduct Medal (Natal)
- Long Service and Good Conduct Medal (New Zealand)
- Medal for Long Service and Good Conduct (South Africa) (pre-1952)
- Permanent Forces of the Empire Beyond the Seas Medal
- Volunteer Long Service Medal for India and the Colonies
- Volunteer Officers' Decoration for India and the Colonies (VD)

South Africa post-1952

- Good Service Medal, Bronze
- Good Service Medal, Gold
- Good Service Medal, Silver
- Long Service Medal, Bronze (Venda)
- Long Service Medal, Gold (Venda)
- Long Service Medal, Silver (Venda)
- Medal for Distinguished Conduct and Loyal Service
- Medal for Long Service and Good Conduct, Bronze (Bophuthatswana)
- Medal for Long Service and Good Conduct, Gold (Bophuthatswana)
- Medal for Long Service and Good Conduct, Silver (Bophuthatswana)
- Medal for Long Service, Bronze (Ciskei)
- Medalje vir Troue Diens
- Permanent Force Good Service Medal
- Union Medal
