= Long Service Medal =

Long Service Medal could mean:

- Army Long Service and Good Conduct Medal of the British Army
- Army Long Service and Good Conduct Medal (Cape of Good Hope)
- Army Long Service and Good Conduct Medal (Natal)
- Long Service Medal (Military) (Singapore) of the Singapore Armed Forces
- Medal for Long Service and Good Conduct (Military) of the British Army
- Medal for Long Service and Good Conduct (South Africa)
- Naval Long Service and Good Conduct Medal (1830) of the Royal Navy and Royal Marines
- Naval Long Service and Good Conduct Medal (1848) of the Royal Navy and Royal Marines
- Royal Air Force Long Service and Good Conduct Medal of the Royal Air Force
- Wehrmacht Long Service Award
