= Medal for Long Service and Good Conduct (South Africa) =

- Type: Military long service medal
- Awarded for: 18 years service and good conduct
- Country: South Africa
- Presented by: the Monarch of the United Kingdom and the Dominions of the British Commonwealth, and Emperor of India
- Eligibility: Permanent Force Other Ranks, extended to Officers c. 1940
- Status: Discontinued in 1952
- Established: 1939
- Final award: 1952
- Ribbon Bar

Order of wear
- Next (higher): Accumulated Campaign Service Medal
- Equivalent: Army Long Service and Good Conduct Medal; Army Long Service and Good Conduct Medal (Cape of Good Hope); Army Long Service and Good Conduct Medal (Natal); Permanent Forces of the Empire Beyond the Seas Medal; Medal for Long Service and Good Conduct (Military)
- Next (lower): Naval Long Service and Good Conduct Medal (1830)

The Medal for Long Service and Good Conduct (South Africa) (Medalje vir Langdurige Diens en Goeie Gedrag) is a distinctive South African version of the British Medal for Long Service and Good Conduct (Military). It was awarded to members of the Permanent Force of the Union of South Africa who had completed eighteen years of reckonable service.

The British Medal for Long Service and Good Conduct (Military) replaced the Army Long Service and Good Conduct Medal, while the South African and other territorial versions of the new medal replaced the Permanent Forces of the Empire Beyond the Seas Medal which had been instituted in 1910 for award to other ranks of the Permanent Forces of the Dominions and Colonies of the British Empire.

== Origin ==
The United Kingdom's Army Long Service and Good Conduct Medal was instituted by King William IV in 1830. On 31 May 1895, Queen Victoria authorised the institution of territorial versions of the Army Long Service and Good Conduct Medal, as well as of the Distinguished Conduct Medal and the Meritorious Service Medal, for the Dominions and Colonies. In 1910, King Edward VII instituted the Permanent Forces of the Empire Beyond the Seas Medal to replace the several territorial versions of the Army Long Service and Good Conduct Medal.

== Institution ==
On 23 September 1930, King George V cancelled the May 1895 Warrant of Queen Victoria in so far as it relates to the grant of medals for long service. Simultaneously, the Army Long Service and Good Conduct Medal as well as the Permanent Forces of the Empire Beyond the Seas Medal were replaced by the institution of the Medal for Long Service and Good Conduct (Military).

The new medal was instituted as one medal to reward the long service and good conduct of warrant officers, non-commissioned officers and men of all the Permanent Forces of the Home Country and the Dominions, Colonies and Protectorates of the British Empire, and the Indian Army. A subsidiary title was included for the new medal, to denote in which Permanent Force or Regular Force the recipient was serving upon qualifying for the award of the medal. This took the form of a bar attached to the suspender of the Medal, inscribed "Regular Army" on medals awarded to members of the British Army, or with the name of the respective country or colony on the medals awarded by them.

Apart from the subsidiary titles, all but one of the medals were identical. The exception was the Medal for Long Service and Good Conduct (South Africa) which was introduced in December 1939, since the inscriptions on the bar as well as on the reverse of the medal were bilingual, in Afrikaans and English on the bar and in English and Afrikaans on the medal reverse. Instead of the name of the country, South Africa followed the British example and displayed the inscriptions "Staande Mag" and "Permanent Force" on the suspender bar.

== Award criteria ==
The medal was initially only awarded to warrant officers and other ranks who had completed eighteen years of qualifying service in the Permanent Force, but during and after the Second World War officers could also be awarded this medal if they had completed at least twelve of their eighteen years of service in the ranks. War service, subject to certain conditions, was counted as double time.

A Clasp to the medal was introduced in 1940 and could be awarded for thirty years of service. An officer became eligible for the award of the clasp if twenty-two or more of the thirty years of service had been in the ranks and provided that the other criteria had been met.

== Order of wear ==
In the order of wear prescribed by the British Central Chancery of the Orders of Knighthood, the Medal for Long Service and Good Conduct (South Africa) ranks on par with the Medal for Long Service and Good Conduct (Military). It takes precedence after the Accumulated Campaign Service Medal and before the Naval Long Service and Good Conduct Medal (1830).

=== South Africa ===
With effect from 6 April 1952, when a new South African set of decorations and medals was instituted to replace the British awards used to date, the older British decorations and medals which were applicable to South Africa continued to be worn in the same order of precedence but, with the exception of the Victoria Cross, took precedence after all South African decorations and medals awarded to South Africans on or after that date. Of the official British medals which were applicable to South Africans, the Medal for Long Service and Good Conduct (South Africa) takes precedence as shown.

- Preceded by the Permanent Forces of the Empire Beyond the Seas Medal.
- Succeeded by the Volunteer Officers' Decoration for India and the Colonies (VD).

== Description ==
Obverse

The medal was struck in silver and is a disk, 36 millimetres in diameter and with a raised rim. It bears the effigy of King George VI and is inscribed "GEORGIVS VI D: G: BR: OMN: REX ET INDIAE IMP:" around the perimeter, with the inscription beginning and ending at the eight o'clock position.

Reverse

The reverse is plain with a raised rim and bears the English and Afrikaans inscriptions "FOR LONG SERVICE AND GOOD CONDUCT" and "VIR LANGDURIGE DIENS EN GOEIE GEDRAG", each language in four lines and the languages separated by a 12 millimetres long line. The name of the recipient was impressed on the rim of the medal.

Suspender

The fixed suspender has a bar attached to its top which bears, on the obverse only, the Afrikaans and English inscriptions "STAANDE MAG" and "PERMANENT FORCE" in two lines. The suspender is affixed to the medal by means of a single-toe claw and a pin through the upper edge of the medal.

Ribbon

The ribbon is 32 millimetres wide and crimson, edged with white bands, each 3 millimetres wide.

== Discontinuation ==
Award of the Medal for Long Service and Good Conduct (South Africa) was discontinued on 6 April 1952. The medal was replaced by the Union Medal, which could be awarded to both officers and other ranks who had completed eighteen years of qualifying service in the Permanent Force.
