= Army Long Service and Good Conduct Medal =

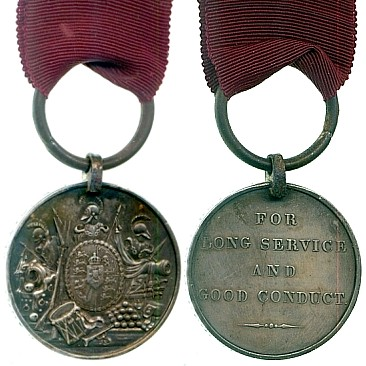
- King William IV version with ring suspender
- Type: Military long service medal
- Awarded for: Until 1870: 21 years infantry or 24 years cavalry service From 1870: 18 years service and good conduct
- Country: United Kingdom
- Presented by: the King of the United Kingdom of Great Britain and Ireland, and King of Hanover
- Eligibility: Permanent Force Other Ranks
- Status: Discontinued in 1930
- Established: 30 July 1830
- First award: 1830
- Ribbon Bars until and from 1916

Order of wear
- Next (higher): Accumulated Campaign Service Medal
- Equivalent: Army Long Service and Good Conduct Medal (Cape of Good Hope); Army Long Service and Good Conduct Medal (Natal); Permanent Forces of the Empire Beyond the Seas Medal; Medal for Long Service and Good Conduct (Military)
- Next (lower): Naval Long Service and Good Conduct Medal (1848)

The Army Long Service and Good Conduct Medal was instituted by King William IV in 1830. The medal remained in use for 100 years, until it was replaced by the Medal for Long Service and Good Conduct (Military) in 1930. During that time the reverse of the medal remained virtually unchanged, while the design of the obverse was altered during the reigns of Queen Victoria, King Edward VII and King George V.

== Institution ==
The Army Long Service and Good Conduct Medal was instituted by King William IV in 1830, for award to soldiers for long service and good conduct. It was the first non-campaign medal of the British Army.

The obverse of the original medal showed a Trophy of Arms that incorporated a central shield bearing the Royal Coat of Arms, with the House of Hanover Shield in its centre. On the Queen Victoria version, introduced after her succession to the throne in 1837, the Hanover emblem was removed from the central shield. Upon the succession of King Edward VII to the throne in 1901, his effigy was placed on the medal's obverse, followed by the effigy of King George V in 1910.

== Award criteria ==
The medal was initially awarded to soldiers in the ranks who had completed 21 years of service in the infantry or 24 years in the cavalry. From 1870 the qualifying period was reduced and the medal was awarded to non-commissioned officers and men who had completed eighteen years of irreproachable service, irrespective whether the service was in the infantry or the cavalry. From 1894 onwards, 'service of a soldier under 18 years of age may be included in the 18 years required to qualify.'

A recipient who was subsequently awarded the Meritorious Service Medal had to stop wearing the Army Long Service and Good Conduct Medal.

== Adoption ==
On 31 May 1895 Queen Victoria authorised Dominion and Colonial governments to adopt various military medals, including the Army Long Service and Good Conduct Medal, and to award them to their local military forces. Territories that took advantage of the authorisation include Canada, Cape of Good Hope, India, Natal, New South Wales, New Zealand, Queensland, South Australia, Tasmania, Victoria and, from 1901, the Commonwealth of Australia.

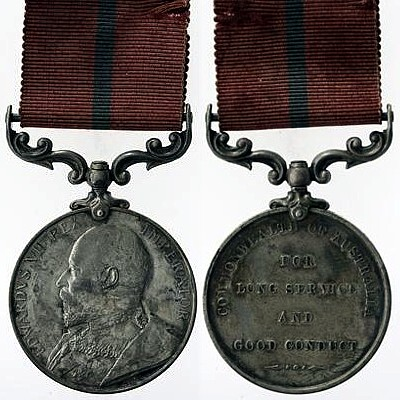
Commonwealth of Australia version

These territorial medals were identical to the Victoria and Edward VII versions of the medal, but with the name of each respective territory inscribed in a curved line above the usual inscription on the reverse of their respective medals. In addition, instead of a plain crimson ribbon, the ribbon of each territorial medal has a 4 millimetres wide band added in the centre, in a colour to represent the specific territory.

The award of these territorial versions of the medal was discontinued when the Permanent Forces of the Empire Beyond the Seas Medal was instituted in 1910 as a single common award for long service and good conduct in the Permanent or Regular Forces of the Dominions and Colonies.

== Order of wear ==
In the order of wear prescribed by the British Central Chancery of the Orders of Knighthood, the Army Long Service and Good Conduct Medal and its territorial versions rank on par with the Medal for Long Service and Good Conduct (Military) that replaced it in 1930. It takes precedence after the Accumulated Campaign Service Medal and before the Naval Long Service and Good Conduct Medal (1830).

== Description ==
The medal was struck in silver and is a disk, 36 millimetres (1.42 inches) in diameter and 3 millimetres (0.12 inches) thick. Apart from the different obverse designs that came into use with each successive monarch, the suspension of the medal evolved over the years from a small or large ring to a plain curved bar suspender, and eventually an ornamented scroll pattern suspender that was initially a swivelling type and finally a fixed non-swivelling type.

Reverse

The reverse of all versions of the medal is smooth with a raised rim and bears the inscription "FOR LONG SERVICE AND GOOD CONDUCT" in four straight lines in the centre. The inscription is underlined by two spear blades, which evolved from three tied balls between the two blades on early versions of the medal to three separate balls between the blades on later versions.

Ribbon

The ribbon was plain crimson from the medal's institution until 1916, initially 1 inch (25 millimetres) wide for the early small ring suspender medals and thereafter 1 1/4 inches (32 millimetres) wide for the subsequent medals with a large ring or bar suspenders. The same plain crimson ribbon was used with the Victoria Cross, but with a miniature button emblem of the Cross worn on the ribbon bar in undress.

From June 1916 a new ribbon was used, at times crimson or sometimes reddish violet, and edged with 3 millimetres wide white bands.

== Versions ==
=== King William IV ===
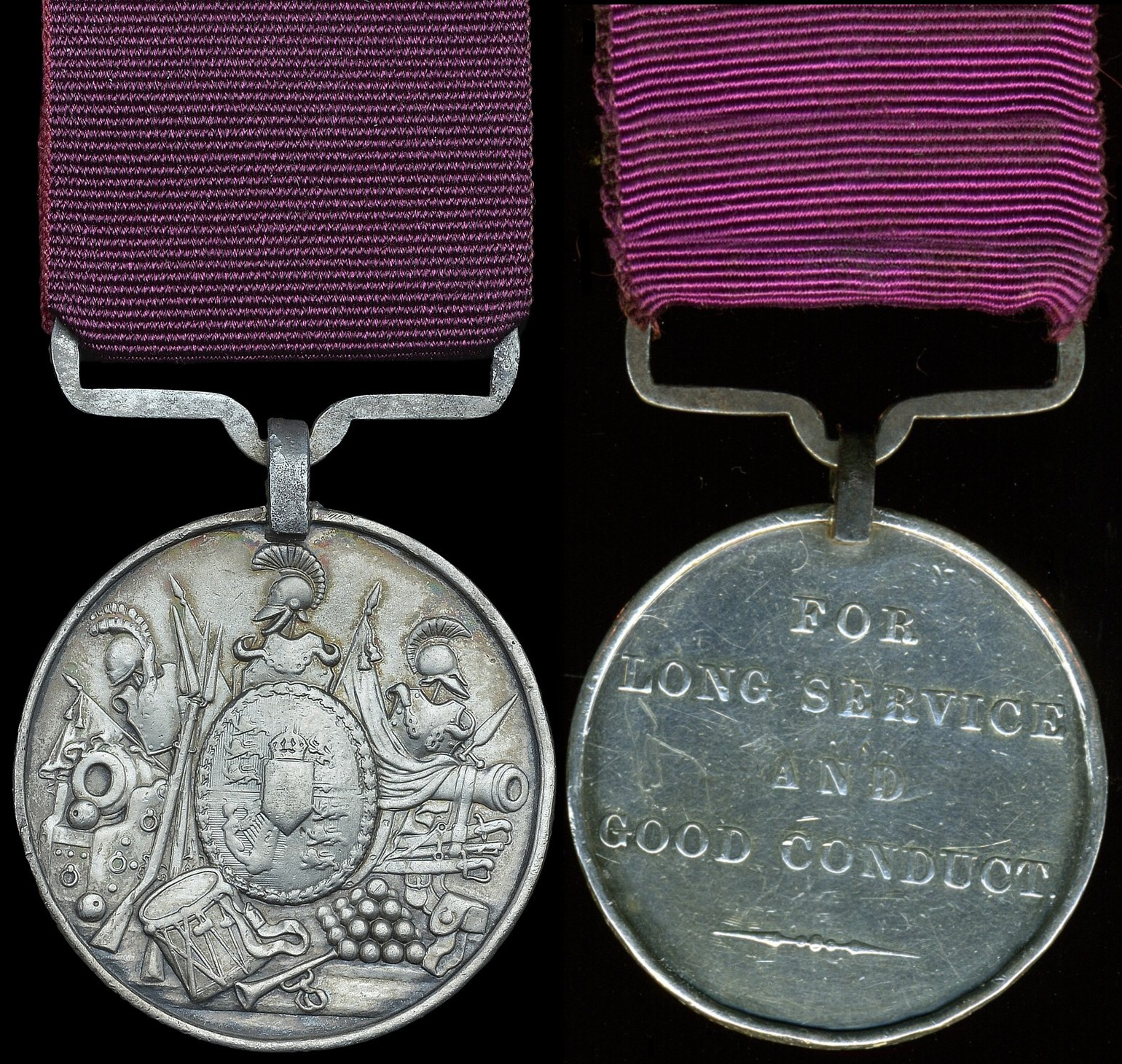
William IV version with curved bar suspender

The King William IV version of the medal was struck in 1830. Since he was the King of the United Kingdom of Great Britain and Ireland and King of Hanover, the obverse depicted a Trophy of Arms that incorporated a central shield bearing the Royal Coat of Arms, with the House of Hanover Shield in its centre.

The obverse of this medal was designed by Benedetto Pistrucci, who also created the Saint George and the Dragon design which was used on the British gold sovereigns and crowns that first appeared during the Great Recoinage of 1816.

The first suspender was a clip with a small ring, but a larger ring was used from 1831, as depicted in the main picture above. Some of the later King William versions of the medal were suspended from a bar formed from rectangular wire, with a "U" shape on the lower part to pass through the steel clip that attached it to the medal, as depicted alongside.

=== Queen Victoria ===
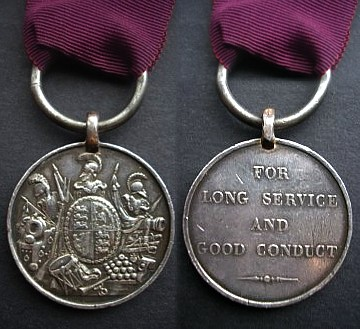
Victoria version with ring suspender

In 1837, upon the coronation of Queen Victoria, the personal union of the United Kingdom and Hanover ended as a result of differing succession laws. In terms of Salic Law, Hanover could only be inherited by a male heir, with the result that Hanover's throne was inherited by Victoria's uncle Ernest Augustus, younger brother of King William IV.

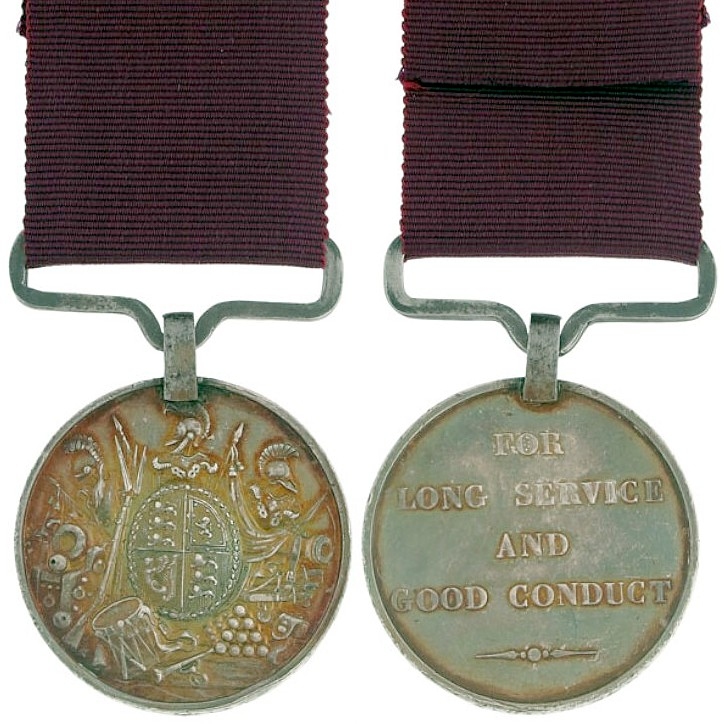
Victoria version with curved bar suspender

On the Queen Victoria version of the medal, the House of Hanover Shield was therefore removed from the central shield on the obverse. The same Victorian obverse design was also used for the original version of the Distinguished Conduct Medal that was instituted in 1854.

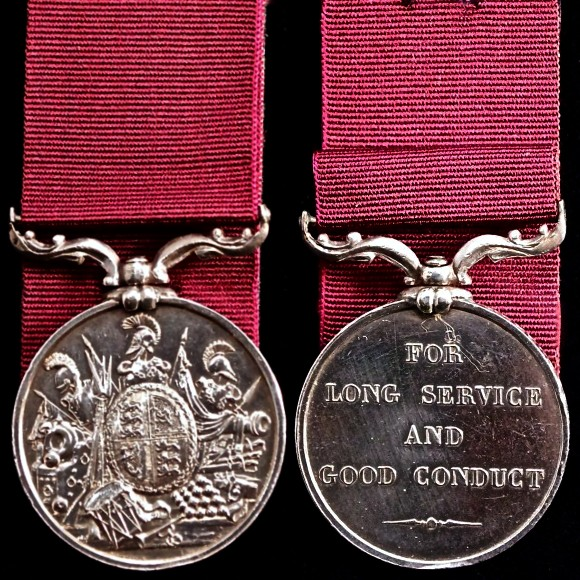
Victoria version with scroll suspender

The reverse remained unaltered, while the suspender was still either a large ring or a rectangular wire bar, attached to the medal with an apparently silver clip.

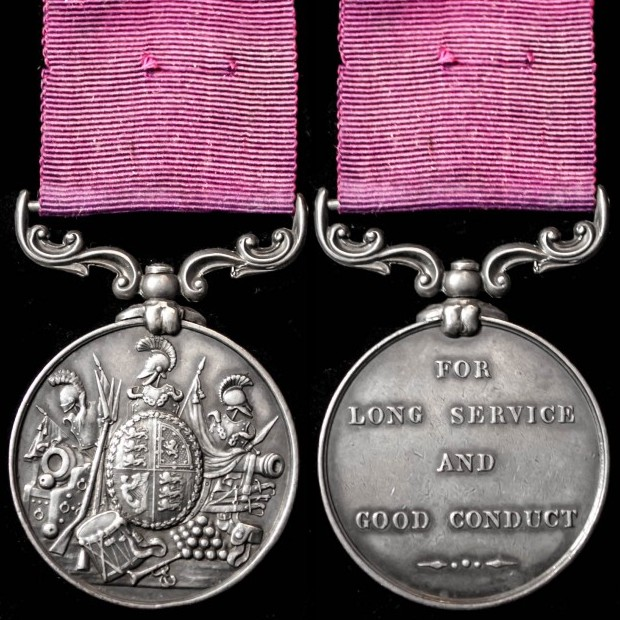
Victoria version with small lettering

Due to the large number of these medals that were awarded during the long reign of Queen Victoria, new dies had to be cut from time to time, which resulted in differences in appearance. In 1855 a Victoria version of the medal with new swivelling scroll suspender began to be produced. The suspender was affixed to the medal by means of a double-toe claw and a horizontal pin through the upper edge of the medal.

From 1874 a fourth version of the Victoria medal appeared, with smaller lettering on the reverse and with the underline to the inscription now two spear blades separated by three separate balls. The medal also had a redesigned and more elaborate scroll suspender.

The Victoria version of the medal was awarded up to the Army Order of July 1902, post-dating her death.

=== King Edward VII ===
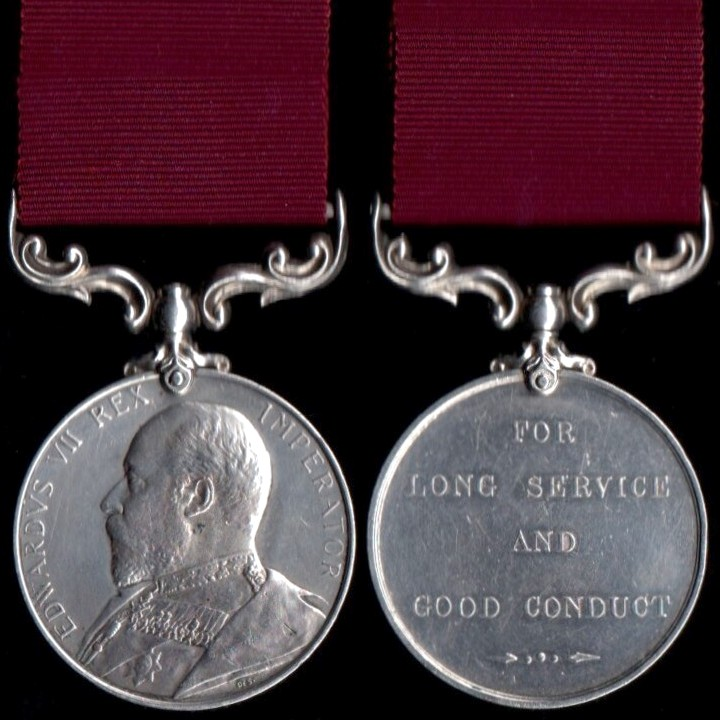
Edward VII version

After the death of Queen Victoria, the obverse of the Army Long Service and Good Conduct Medal was changed to an effigy of the ruling monarch. The obverse of the Edward VII version, instituted in 1901, shows the King in Field Marshal's uniform, facing left, and is inscribed "EDWARDVS VII REX IMPERATOR" around the perimeter.

The reverse of the medal remained unchanged, but the swivelling scroll suspender on this and subsequent versions was affixed to the medal by means of a single-toe claw and a horizontal pin through the upper edge of the medal.

The Edward VII version of the medal was awarded up to the Army Order of April 1911, post-dating his death.

=== King George V ===
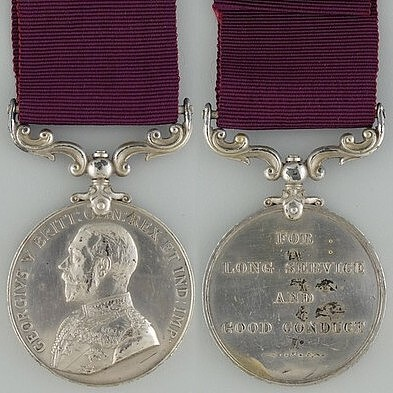
George V version

The obverse of the George V version, instituted in 1910, shows the King in Field Marshal's uniform, facing left. It is inscribed "GEORGIVS V BRITT: OMN: REX ET IND: IMP:" around the perimeter.

In 1916 a new ribbon began to be used for the medal, as published in Army Order 183 of June 1916, to distinguish it from the ribbon of the Victoria Cross. It was still crimson, but edged with 3 millimetres wide white bands. In 1920 the swivelling scroll suspender was altered to a fixed non-swivelling type. The means of attachment to the medal remained a single-toe claw and a pin through the medal's upper edge.

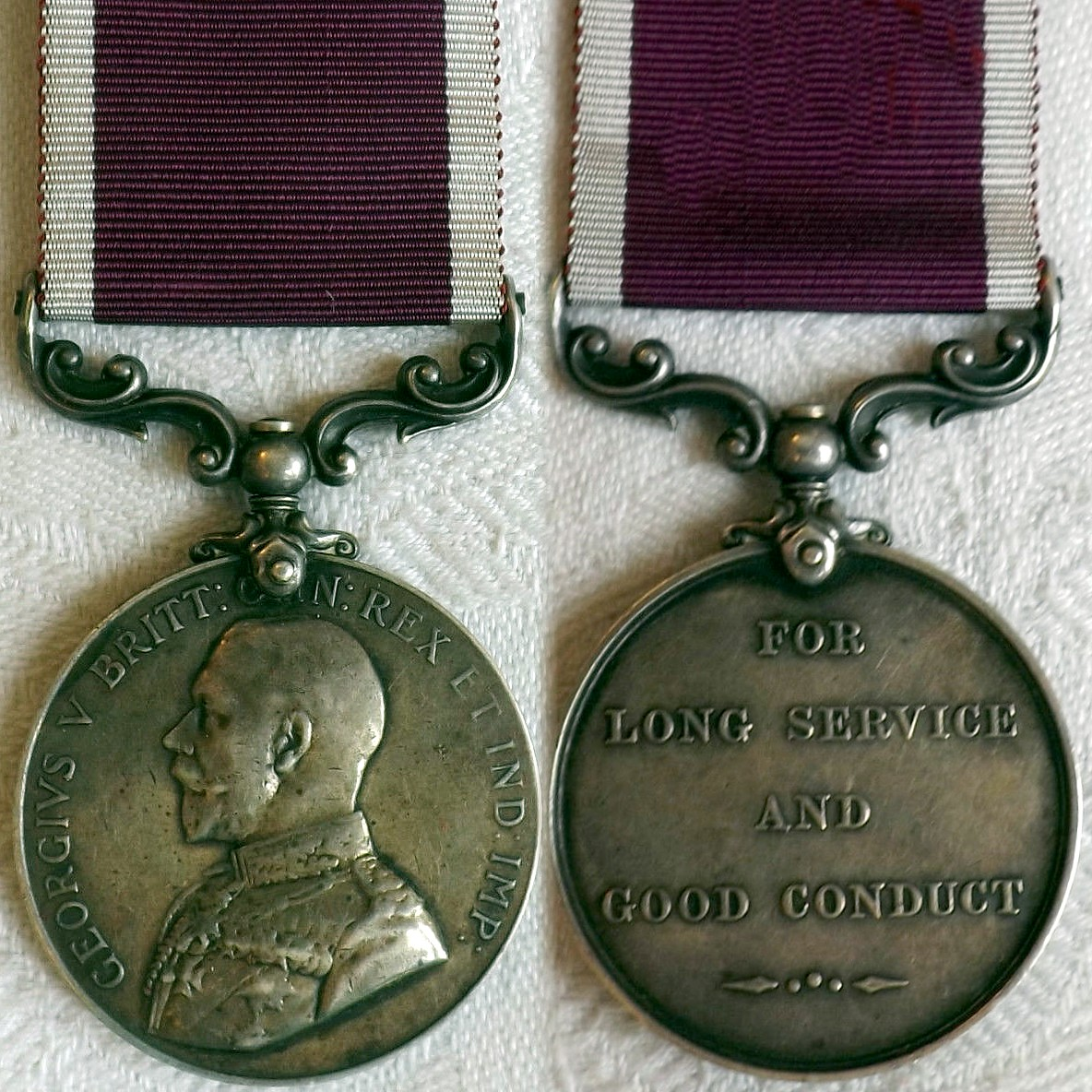
George V version with new ribbon and swivelling suspender

Apart from the new ribbon, two other changes to the British long service and good conduct medal structure occurred during the reign of King George V. In 1910 the territorial versions of the Army Long Service and Good Conduct Medal were discontinued and replaced by the Permanent Forces of the Empire Beyond the Seas Medal, as a single common award for long service and good conduct in the Permanent or Regular Forces of the Dominions and Colonies.

While the Royal Navy already had the Naval Long Service and Good Conduct Medal (1848), the birth of aerial warfare during the First World War and the establishment of the Royal Air Force in 1918 led to the institution of the Royal Air Force Long Service and Good Conduct Medal in 1919.

== Discontinuation ==
On 23 September 1930, 100 years after it had been instituted, the Army Long Service and Good Conduct Medal was replaced, along with the Permanent Forces of the Empire Beyond the Seas Medal, by the Medal for Long Service and Good Conduct (Military) as a single medal for the British Army and all regular and permanent military forces of the British Empire. This new medal once again had various territorial versions, but this time in the form of subsidiary titles inscribed on a bar attached to the suspender of the medal, rather than on the medal reverse.
