= Stanley Herbert Crump =

Brigadier Stanley Herbert Crump CBE, DSO
- Born: 25 January 1889
- Died: 13 July 1974 (aged 85); Lower Hutt, New Zealand
- Military career
- Allegiance: New Zealand
- Branch: New Zealand Army
- Service years: 1914–1947
- Rank: Brigadier
- Unit: New Zealand Army Service Corps
- Commands: Commander Royal Army Service Corps, 2 NZEF (1939–1945); Commanding Officer, J Force (1947)
- Conflicts: First World War (Egypt, Sinai, Palestine); Second World War (Greece, North Africa)
- Awards: Commander of the Order of the British Empire (CBE); Distinguished Service Order (DSO)

Brigadier Stanley Herbert Crump, CBE, DSO (1889–1974) was a senior New Zealand Army officer and military logistician who served as Commander Royal Army Service Corps (CRASC) of the 2nd New Zealand Expeditionary Force (2 NZEF) during the Second World War. He commanded New Zealand Army Service Corps (NZASC) units from 1939 to 1945 and later served as Commanding Officer of J Force in 1947. He was the only New Zealand officer to remain continuously in brigade- or divisional-level command throughout the entire war.

== Early life and education ==
Crump was born in 1889 and was educated at Wellington College. He joined the New Zealand Territorial Force in December 1914 following the outbreak of the First World War.

== First World War ==
During the First World War, Crump served with the New Zealand Expeditionary Force in Egypt and the Sinai–Palestine campaign. He held supply and transport appointments with mounted formations, gaining experience in desert logistics and mobile operations.

== Inter-war service ==
After returning to New Zealand in 1919, Crump joined the Permanent Forces and resumed service with the NZASC. Over the next two decades, he held a succession of increasingly senior administrative and logistical appointments within the New Zealand Military Forces.

During the inter-war period, Crump played a significant role in sustaining and modernising Army Service Corps capability. He oversaw aspects of the gradual transition from horse-drawn transport to motorised logistics, reflecting broader technological and organisational changes within the Army. At the same time, he was required to maintain operational effectiveness under the severe financial constraints imposed during the Great Depression, when defence funding was substantially reduced.

His principal appointments during this period included:

- Officer in Charge, New Zealand Army Service Corps – 7 May 1923
- Assistant Quartermaster-General (AQMG) – 1 July 1924
- Deputy Assistant Quartermaster-General – 1 October 1924
- Deputy Adjutant and Quartermaster-General – 1 June 1931

Despite his appointment to Quartermaster-General staff roles, Crump retained his position as Officer in Charge of the NZASC combining corps leadership with senior administrative responsibilities at Army level. These dual roles placed him at the centre of logistics policy, organisational development, and sustainment planning during a formative period in the evolution of New Zealand’s military logistics system.

== Second World War ==
=== Commander, New Zealand Army Service Corps (1939–1945) ===
At the outbreak of the Second World War, Crump was appointed Commander Royal Army Service Corps (CRASC) of the 2nd New Zealand Expeditionary Force. From 1939 to 1945 he commanded NZASC units responsible for transport, supply, petrol distribution, and catering for the 2nd New Zealand Division.

He embarked with the First Echelon in January 1940 and served in Greece and North Africa. His responsibilities included ensuring the sustained delivery of ammunition, petrol, rations and water across extended supply lines. The mobility of the 2nd New Zealand Division during the North African campaign depended heavily on effective mechanical transport and fuel distribution.

His performance was recognised in the New Zealand Gazette of 21 September 1944, which recorded:

This officer commanded NZASC, 2 NZEF since its formation and has served in the field in direct command of NZASC units in the campaigns in Greece, Libya and Egypt. His gallant bearing under fire, his personal leadership in difficult situations, and his determination to ensure supplies of ammunition, petrol, rations and water reaching the Division have inspired all his units with his own aggressive spirit.

Crump was appointed a Commander of the Order of the British Empire (CBE) and made a Companion of the Distinguished Service Order (DSO) for his wartime service.

== Command of J Force ==
In 1947, Crump was appointed Commanding Officer of J Force, New Zealand’s contribution to the British Commonwealth Occupation Force in Japan. He served with J Force until 18 April 1949, overseeing New Zealand logistical and administrative support within the occupation framework.

Upon completion of his service in Japan, Crump returned to New Zealand and was reposted to the Regular Force. He was subsequently placed on the retired list in January 1950, concluding more than three decades of military service.

== Reputation ==
Crump was regarded as a determined and energetic commander who combined organisational skill with personal courage. In Julia Millen’s history of the Corps, Salute to Service (1997), he was referred to as the “Father of the Service”, reflecting the high regard in which he was held within the Army Service Corps.

Despite the importance of his role, Crump received less public recognition than combat commanders such as Bernard Freyberg or Howard Kippenberger. Subsequent historical reassessment has emphasised the central role of logistics in mechanised warfare and re-evaluated his contribution accordingly.

== Death ==
Stanley Herbert Crump died in 1974, aged 85. He was accorded a full military funeral at St. James’ Church, Lower Hutt.

== Medals and awards ==
- Commander of the Order of the British Empire (CBE)
- Distinguished Service Order (DSO)
- 1914–15 Star
- British War Medal (1914–1920)
- Victory Medal with oak leaf
- The 1939–1945 Star
- Africa Star
- Italy Star
- The War Medal 1939–1945
- The New Zealand War Service Medal
