= Permanent Forces of the Empire Beyond the Seas Medal =

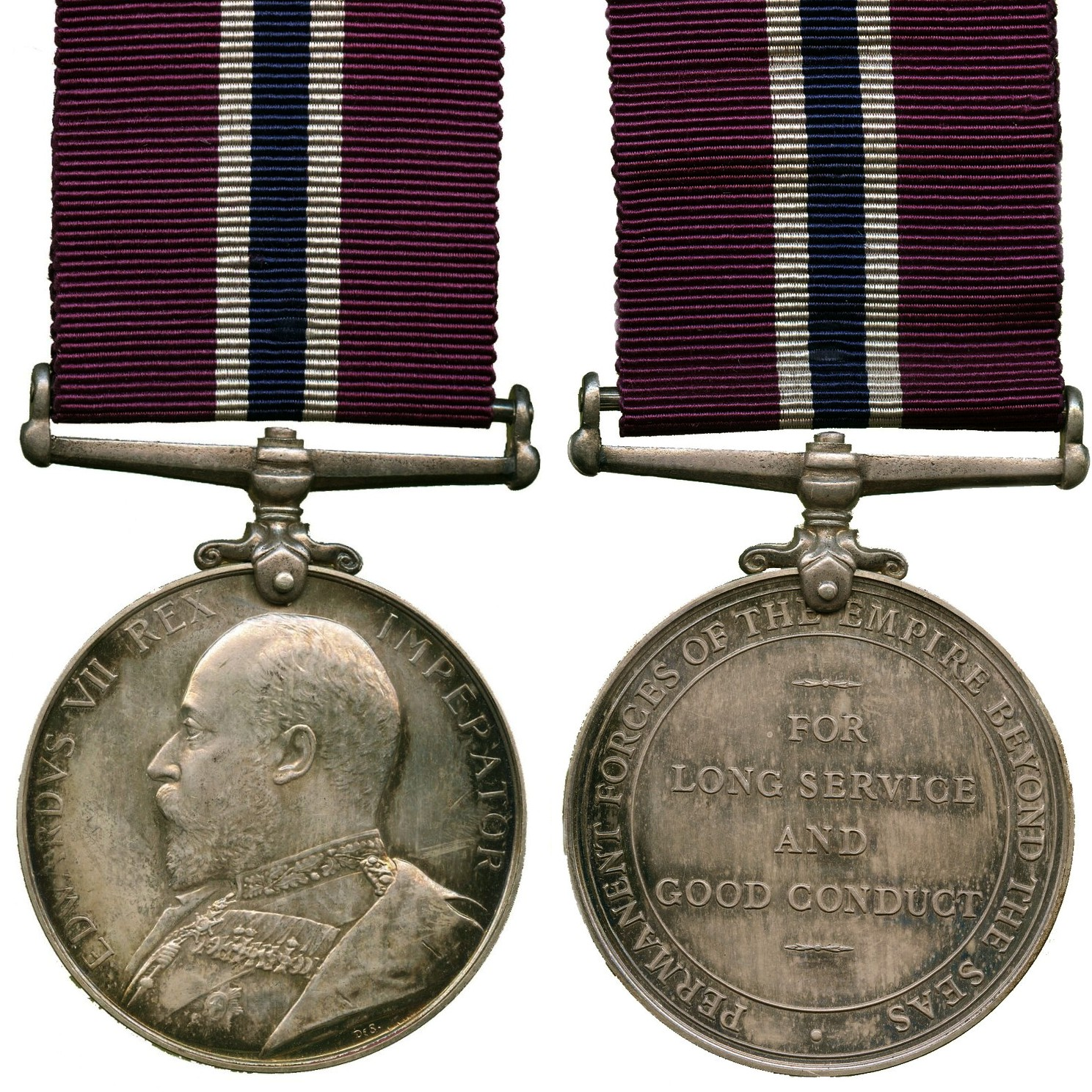
- King Edward VII version
- Type: Military long service medal
- Awarded for: 18 years service and good conduct
- Country: United Kingdom
- Presented by: the Monarch of the United Kingdom and the British Dominions, and Emperor of India
- Eligibility: Permanent Force Other Ranks of the Dominions and Colonies
- Status: Discontinued in 1930
- Established: 1910
- Final award: 1930

Order of Wear
- Next (higher): Accumulated Campaign Service Medal
- Equivalent: Army Long Service and Good Conduct Medal; Army Long Service and Good Conduct Medal (Cape of Good Hope); Army Long Service and Good Conduct Medal (Natal)
- Next (lower): Naval Long Service and Good Conduct Medal (1830)

The Permanent Forces of the Empire Beyond the Seas Medal is a long service and good conduct medal, instituted for award to other ranks of the Permanent Forces of the Dominions and Colonies of the British Empire. The medal, also known as the Permanent Overseas Forces Long Service and Good Conduct Medal, was established in 1910 as a single common award to supersede the several local versions of the Army Long Service and Good Conduct Medal which were being awarded by the various territories.

Along with the Army Long Service and Good Conduct Medal, the Permanent Forces of the Empire Beyond the Seas Medal was, in turn, superseded in 1930 by the Medal for Long Service and Good Conduct (Military), which once again had various territorial versions.

== Origin ==
The United Kingdom's Army Long Service and Good Conduct Medal was instituted by King William IV in 1830. The original medal had the Royal Coat of Arms with the badge of Hanover on the obverse, while on the Queen Victoria version, introduced upon her succession to the throne in 1837, the Hanover emblem was replaced by a Trophy of Arms which incorporated a central shield bearing the Royal Coat of Arms. Upon the succession of King Edward VII to the throne in 1901, his effigy was placed on the medal's obverse. The medal's ribbon was plain crimson from 1830 until 1917, when white bands were added to the edges.

On 31 May 1895, Queen Victoria authorised Colonial governments to adopt, amongst others, the Army Long Service and Good Conduct Medal and to award it to other ranks of their local permanent military forces. Territories which took advantage of the authorisation include Canada, Cape of Good Hope, India, Natal, New South Wales, New Zealand, Queensland, South Australia, Tasmania and Victoria. Their respective versions of the Army Long Service and Good Conduct Medal were identical to the Queen Victoria version of the United Kingdom's medal, but with the names of the respective territories inscribed in a curved line above the inscription "FOR LONG SERVICE AND GOOD CONDUCT" on the reverse. All these territorial medals had ribbons in the same crimson colour as that of the British medal, but with a 4 millimetres wide band in the centre in a colour to represent each territory.

Second versions of most of these medals, with the effigy of King Edward VII on the obverse, were awarded from 1902. The reverse of these medals remained the same for all but the five Australian territories. Since the Commonwealth of Australia had been formed on 1 January 1901, the five Queen Victoria versions of the medal for New South Wales, Queensland, South Australia, Tasmania and Victoria were replaced by a single King Edward VII version with the inscription "COMMONWEALTH OF AUSTRALIA" in a curved line on the reverse.

== Institution ==
The Permanent Forces of the Empire Beyond the Seas Medal was established by King Edward VII in 1910 and superseded the several territorial versions of the Army Long Service and Good Conduct Medal which were being awarded by the various territories of the British Empire.

Like the United Kingdom's Army Long Service and Good Conduct Medal, the Permanent Forces of the Empire Beyond the Seas Medal was instituted as an Army award, since members of the Royal Navy were eligible for the award of the Naval Long Service and Good Conduct Medal instead. From 1 February 1920, when the South African Air Force was established as the first independent Air Force outside the United Kingdom, eligibility for award was extended to members of the Air Forces of the Empire as they were being established as independent Air Forces, separate from the respective Armies.

== Award criteria ==
The Permanent Forces of the Empire Beyond the Seas Medal could be awarded to warrant officers, non-commissioned officers and men who had completed eighteen years of irreproachable service in the ranks of a Permanent Force of any of the Dominions and Colonies of the British Empire. The medal was unique to the Empire "beyond the seas" and could not be awarded for long service in the Permanent Force in the United Kingdom, where the Army Long Service and Good Conduct Medal continued to be awarded.

While the medal was created by Royal Warrant, issued by the British Government, and was struck and named by the Royal Mint in London, the actual administration of each award of the medal was delegated to the respective territorial governments of the Empire.

== Order of wear ==
In the order of wear prescribed by the British Central Chancery of the Orders of Knighthood, the Permanent Forces of the Empire Beyond the Seas Medal ranks on par with the United Kingdom's Army Long Service and Good Conduct Medal and its territorial versions, and the Medal for Long Service and Good Conduct (Military). They all take precedence after the Accumulated Campaign Service Medal and before the Naval Long Service and Good Conduct Medal (1830).

=== South Africa ===
With effect from 6 April 1952, when a new South African set of decorations and medals was instituted to replace the British awards used to date, the older British decorations and medals which were applicable to South Africa continued to be worn in the same order of precedence but, with the exception of the Victoria Cross, took precedence after all South African orders, decorations and medals awarded to South Africans on or after that date. Of the official British medals which were applicable to South Africans, the Permanent Forces of the Empire Beyond the Seas Medal takes precedence as shown.

- Preceded by the Army Long Service and Good Conduct Medal (Natal).
- Succeeded by the Medal for Long Service and Good Conduct (South Africa).

== Description ==
The Permanent Forces of the Empire Beyond the Seas Medal was struck in silver and is a disk, 36 millimetres (1.42 inches) in diameter and 3 millimetres (0.12 inches) thick. The medal is mounted from a single-toe claw, affixed to the medal by means of a horizontal pin through the upper edge of the medal and with double-scroll claw supports on the rim. The mount attaches to a straight, swiveling suspension bar.

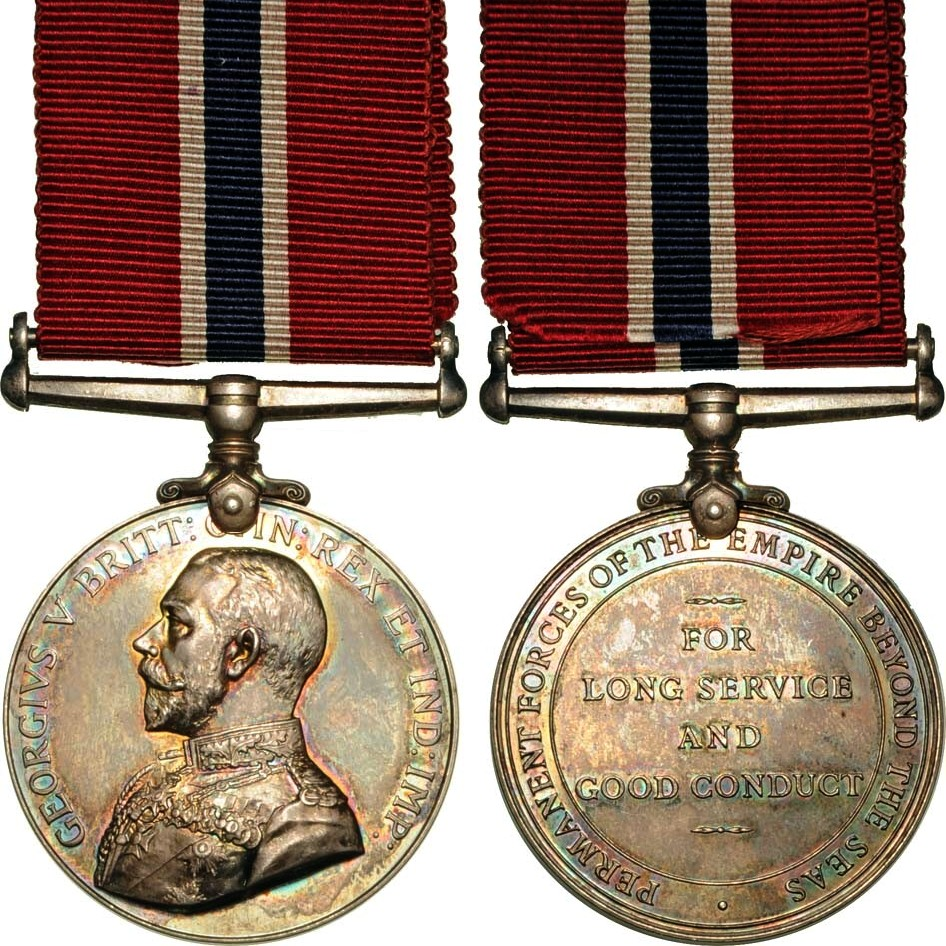
King George V version

Obverse

The obverse of the first version of the medal has a raised rim and depicts the effigy of King Edward VII in the uniform of a Field Marshal, facing left. It is inscribed "EDWARDVS VII REX IMPERATOR" around the perimeter.

The second version of the medal was instituted after the coronation of King George V on 22 June 1911 and depicts his effigy in the uniform of a Field Marshal, facing left. It is inscribed "GEORGIVS V BRITT: OMN: REX ET IND: IMP:" around the perimeter.

Reverse

The reverse is smooth with a raised rim. Around the perimeter, between the circumferences of two concentric circles, it bears the inscription "PERMANENT FORCES OF THE EMPIRE BEYOND THE SEAS" and, in the centre "FOR LONG SERVICE AND GOOD CONDUCT" in four lines.

Ribbon

The ribbon is 32 millimetres wide, with an 11½ millimetres wide crimson band and a 2½ millimetres wide white band, repeated in reverse order and separated by a 4 millimetres wide dark blue band.

== Recipients ==
In Canada, 839 medals were awarded to members of the Canadian Army, and one to a member of the Royal Canadian Air Force.

== Discontinuation ==
The Permanent Forces of the Empire Beyond the Seas Medal and the United Kingdom's Army Long Service and Good Conduct Medal were both superseded on 23 September 1930, when a new Royal Warrant was promulgated by King George V to establish a single Medal for Long Service and Good Conduct (Military) for the British Army and all regular and permanent military forces of the British Empire. This medal once again had various territorial versions, but this time in the form of subsidiary titles inscribed on a bar attached to the suspender of the medal, rather than on the medal reverse. One exception was the South African version, which had a bilingual inscription on the medal reverse.
