= Desmond Rice =

British Army officer (1924–2020)

Major-General Sir Desmond Hind Garrett Rice, KCVO, CBE (1924 – 14 July 2020) was a British Army officer and courtier. He was Director of Manning (Army) between 1977 and 1978 and Vice-Adjutant-General between 1978 and 1979; he was then Colonel of 1st The Queen's Dragoon Guards from 1980 to 1986 and simultaneously served as Secretary of the Central Chancery of the Orders of Knighthood between 1980 and 1989.

Rice was appointed an Officer of the Order of the British Empire in 1970 and promoted to Commander six years later. In 1985, he was also appointed a Commander of the Royal Victorian Order and promoted to Knight Commander on retirement from the Central Chancery of Orders of Knighthood in 1989.

He died on 14 July 2020 at the age of 95.
