= Army Long Service and Good Conduct Medal (Natal) =

British Colonial Army medal

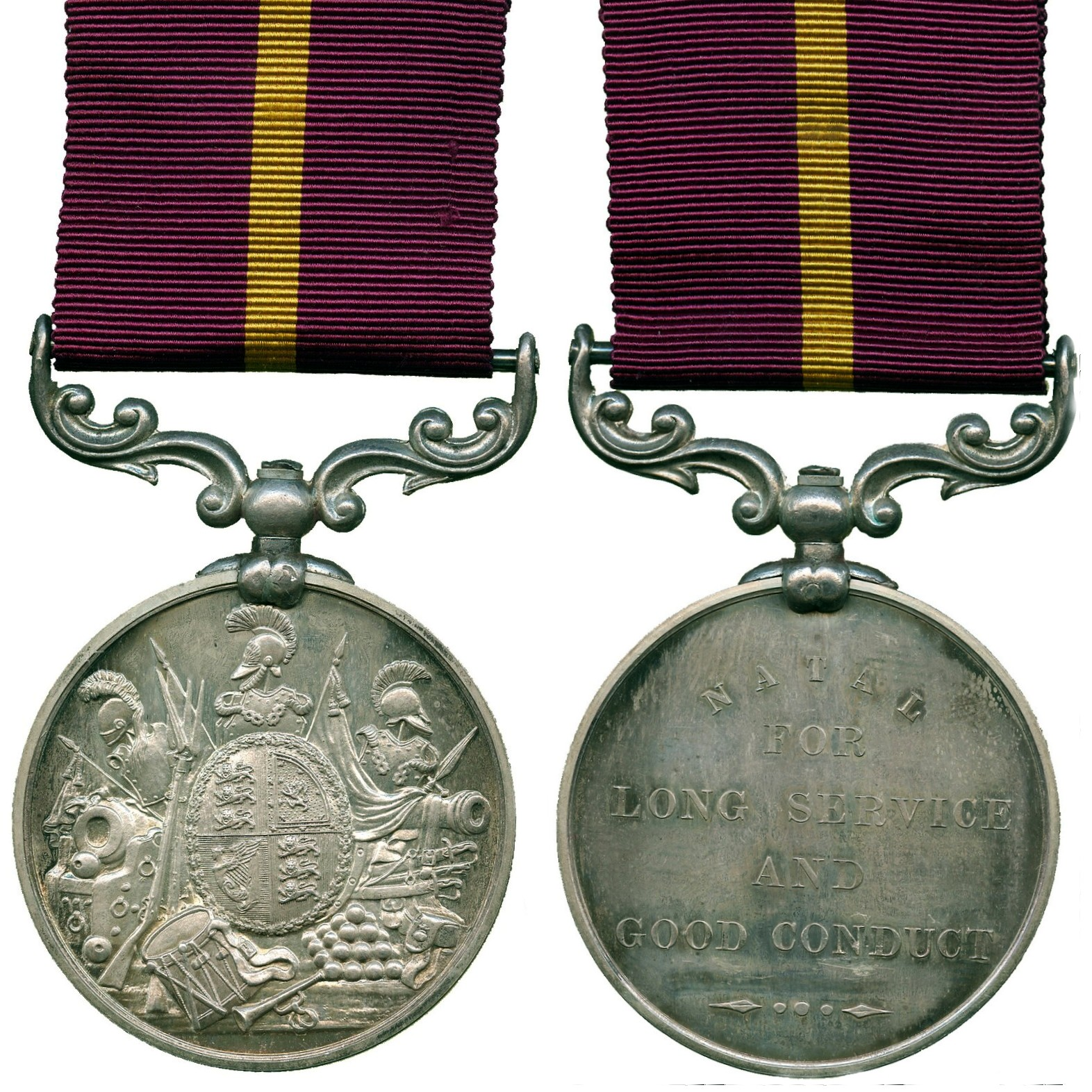
- Queen Victoria version
- Type: Military long service medal
- Awarded for: 18 years service and good conduct
- Country: Colony of Natal
- Presented by: the Monarch of the United Kingdom of Great Britain and Ireland, and Empress of India
- Eligibility: Permanent Force Other Ranks
- Status: Discontinued in 1910
- Established: 1897 (Victoria); 1901 (Edward VII)
- Ribbon Bar

Order of wear
- Next (higher): Accumulated Campaign Service Medal
- Equivalent: Army Long Service and Good Conduct Medal; Army Long Service and Good Conduct Medal (Cape of Good Hope); Permanent Forces of the Empire Beyond the Seas Medal
- Next (lower): Naval Long Service and Good Conduct Medal (1830)

In May 1895, Queen Victoria authorised Colonial governments to adopt various British military medals and to award them to their local military forces. The Colony of Natal introduced this system in August 1895 and, in 1897, instituted the Army Long Service and Good Conduct Medal (Natal).

== Origin ==
The United Kingdom's Army Long Service and Good Conduct Medal was instituted by King William IV in 1830. The original version had the Royal Coat of Arms with the badge of Hanover on the obverse, while on the Queen Victoria version, introduced upon her succession to the throne in 1837, the Hanover emblem was replaced by a Trophy of Arms which incorporated a central shield bearing the Royal Coat of Arms. Upon the succession of King Edward VII to the throne in 1901, his effigy was placed on the medal's obverse. The medal's ribbon was plain crimson from 1830 until 1917, when white bands were added to the edges.

The medal was originally awarded to soldiers of good conduct who had completed 21 years of service in the infantry or 24 years in the cavalry. From 1870, the qualifying period was reduced and the medal was awarded to soldiers of good conduct who had completed 18 years of service.

== Natal Colonial Forces ==
In the late 19th century, the military forces of the Colony of Natal consisted of the para-military Natal Police and a Volunteer Force, which was reorganised as the Natal Militia in 1904. The Natal Police and Natal Militia were amalgamated to form the Natal Colonial Forces in 1908.

== Institution ==
On 31 May 1895, Queen Victoria authorised Dominion and Colonial governments to adopt various military medals and to award them to their local military forces. The Colony of Natal introduced this system in August 1895. In 1897, one of three known medals which were instituted by Natal in terms of this authority was the Army Long Service and Good Conduct Medal (Natal). The Natal medal ranks on par with its British counterpart in the order of wear.

Other territories which took advantage of the authorisation include Canada, Cape of Good Hope, India, New South Wales, New Zealand, Queensland, South Australia, Tasmania, Victoria and, from 1901, the Commonwealth of Australia.

A second version of the medal, with the effigy of King Edward VII on the obverse, was awarded from 1901. The reverse of the medal remained the same, while the obverse of both versions is the same as that of their respective British counterparts.

== Award criteria ==
The Army Long Service and Good Conduct Medal (Natal) was awarded to non-commissioned officers and men who had completed eighteen years of irreproachable service in the ranks of the Natal Police or the Permanent Force of the Natal Colonial Forces. A recipient who was subsequently awarded the Meritorious Service Medal, had to stop wearing the Army Long Service and Good Conduct Medal.

== Order of wear ==
In the order of wear prescribed by the British Central Chancery of the Orders of Knighthood, the Army Long Service and Good Conduct Medal (Natal) ranks on par with the United Kingdom's Army Long Service and Good Conduct Medal and the Medal for Long Service and Good Conduct (Military). It takes precedence after the Accumulated Campaign Service Medal and before the Naval Long Service and Good Conduct Medal (1830).

=== South Africa ===
With effect from 6 April 1952, when a new South African set of decorations and medals was instituted to replace the British awards used to date, the older British decorations and medals applicable to South Africa continued to be worn in the same order of precedence but, with the exception of the Victoria Cross, took precedence after all South African orders, decorations and medals awarded to South Africans on or after that date. Of the official British medals which were applicable to South Africans, the Army Long Service and Good Conduct Medal (Natal) takes precedence as shown.

- Preceded by the Army Long Service and Good Conduct Medal (Cape of Good Hope).
- Succeeded by the Permanent Forces of the Empire Beyond the Seas Medal.

== Description ==
The medal was struck in silver and is a disk, 36 millimetres (1.42 inches) in diameter and 3 millimetres (0.12 inches) thick. The suspender is an ornamented scroll pattern swivelling type, affixed to the medal by means of a claw and a horizontal pin through the upper edge of the medal. On the Queen Victoria version, the suspender mount is a double-toe claw, while the King Edward VII version has a single-toe claw.

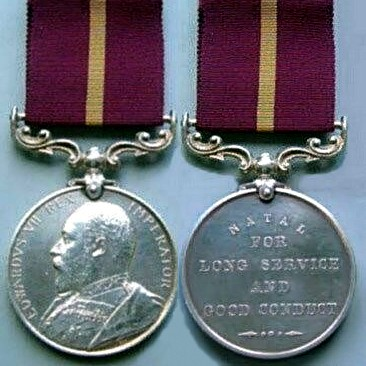
King Edward VII version

Obverse

The obverse of the Queen Victoria version of the Army Long Service and Good Conduct Medal (Natal) is identical to that of the Queen Victoria version of the Distinguished Conduct Medal and shows a Trophy of Arms, incorporating a central shield bearing the Royal Coat of Arms, without any inscription. The King Edward VII version has the effigy of the King and is inscribed "EDWARDVS VII REX IMPERATOR" around the perimeter. Both versions have a raised rim.

Reverse

The reverse of both versions is smooth with a raised rim and bears the inscriptions "NATAL" in a curved line at the top and "FOR LONG SERVICE AND GOOD CONDUCT" in four straight lines in the centre. The inscriptions are underlined by three dots between two spear blades at the bottom.

Ribbon

While the ribbon of the British Army Long Service and Good Conduct Medal was plain crimson until mid-1916, the ribbon of the Natal medal is 32 millimetres wide and crimson, with a 4 millimetres wide light yellow band in the centre.

== Discontinuation ==
Of the four Colonies which were to form the Union of South Africa in 1910, the Cape of Good Hope and the Colony of Natal adopted their own territorial versions of the Army Long Service and Good Conduct Medal. The award of these medals was discontinued when the Union of South Africa was established in 1910 and began to award the Permanent Forces of the Empire Beyond the Seas Medal, instituted in that same year as a single common award for long service and good conduct in the Permanent Forces of the Dominions and Colonies.
