= Royal Air Force Long Service and Good Conduct Medal =

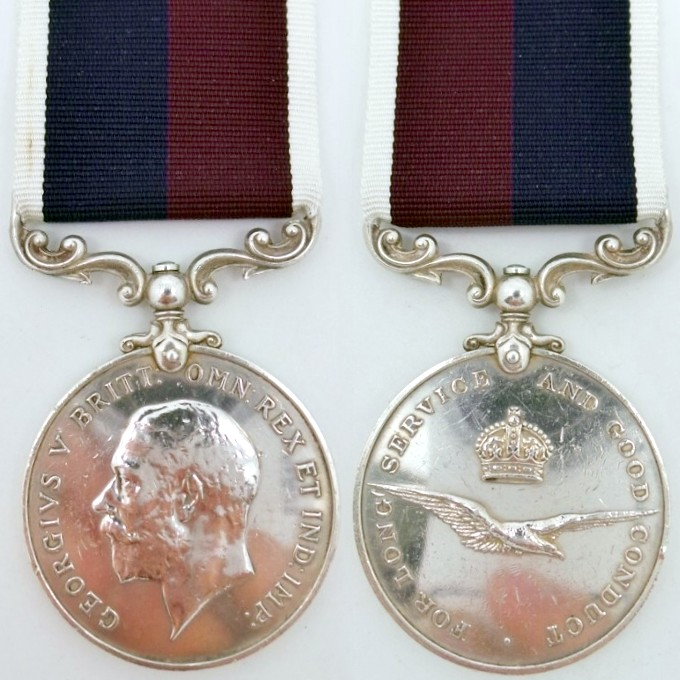
- King George V version
- Type: Military long service medal
- Awarded for: 18 years service until 1977; 15 years service from 1977
- Country: United Kingdom
- Presented by: the Monarch of the United Kingdom and the British Dominions, and Emperor of India
- Eligibility: Air Force Other Ranks; Conditionally to officers from 1947; All regular members from 2016
- Status: Current
- Established: 1919
- First award: October 1919
- Ribbon Bar

Order of wear
- Next (higher): Royal Air Force Meritorious Service Medal (1918–1928)
- Next (lower): Medal for Long Service and Good Conduct (Ulster Defence Regiment)

The Royal Air Force Long Service and Good Conduct Medal is a medal awarded to regular members of the Royal Air Force in recognition of long service. It was instituted by King George V in 1919, the year following the establishment of the world's first independent air force. At first, the medal was awarded to Regular Force non-commissioned officers and airmen of the Royal Air Force. The award criteria were later relaxed to also allow the award of the medal to officers who had served a minimum period in the ranks before being commissioned. Since 2016, it is awarded to all regular members of the RAF, including officers who had never served in the ranks.

== Overview ==
In the complex British honours system, there were distinct awards for officers and men for each service arm, Navy, Army and Air Force, and for each type of service, Regular Force or Reserve components. Regular Force officers were not eligible for any long service awards since, as they held a commission, they were expected to serve honourably and for a long period of time. Reserve Force officers were eligible for various long service decorations that granted them the use of post-nominal letters, while Reserve Force other ranks were eligible for various long service and good conduct medals, but without post-nominals.

== Institution ==
The Royal Air Force - the world's first Air Force - was established on 1 April 1918 by the amalgamation of the Royal Flying Corps of the Army and the Royal Naval Air Service of the Navy. Regular Force other ranks of the new "junior service" had earlier been eligible for the award of either the Army Long Service and Good Conduct Medal or the Naval Long Service and Good Conduct Medal (1848), depending on their service of origin. In the year following the establishment of the Royal Air Force, on 1 July 1919, the Royal Air Force Long Service and Good Conduct Medal was instituted by King George V, and the first awards of the medal were announced in October 1919.

== Award criteria ==
When it was instituted, the medal could be awarded to Regular Force Royal Air Force non-commissioned officers and airmen after eighteen years of unblemished service. The qualifying period was reduced to fifteen years with effect from 1 December 1977.

Eligibility

An airman became eligible for the award of the medal upon completion of eighteen (later fifteen) years of reckonable service from the date of attestation or age 17½, whichever was later. However, there were a number of offences which would normally preclude award of the medal. Awards were only made after a thorough check of an airman's record of service. The award of the medal required the recommendation of the individual's commanding officer and it could therefore only be awarded to serving personnel.

Prior to 1944 up to four years of the required total could have been earned in either the Royal Navy or British Army before the serviceman had transferred to the Royal Air Force. Prior to 1945 the medal could be awarded for distinguished service in wartime or emergency, without the time served or good conduct requirement having to be fulfilled.

Clasp

From 1944 a clasp to the medal could be awarded for additional periods of eighteen (later fifteen) years of good service. As of 1 Oct 16, a clasp is awarded for each period of ten years of unblemished service.

Officers

Regular Force officers were traditionally not eligible for any long service awards. From 1947, announced in AMO A576, Royal Air Force Officers also became eligible for the award of the medal, but only if at least twelve of the fifteen years of their service had been in the ranks and provided that the conduct requirements for the award of the medal had been met. Also from that date, an officer became eligible for the award of the clasp if at least twenty-two of the thirty years of his or her service had been in the ranks and provided that the conduct requirements had been met.

Effective from 1 October 2016, but with eligibility backdated to 29 July 2014, all Officers become eligible for the award, following 15 years service without any disciplinary records.

== Order of wear ==
In the order of wear prescribed by the British Central Chancery of the Orders of Knighthood, the Royal Air Force Long Service and Good Conduct Medal takes precedence after the Royal Air Force Meritorious Service Medal (1918–1928) and before the Medal for Long Service and Good Conduct (Ulster Defence Regiment).

== Description ==
The medal was struck in silver and is a disk, 36 millimetres (1.42 inches) in diameter.

Obverse

The obverse of the medal shows the effigy of the reigning monarch, King George V, on the first version. Two versions of the medal each were produced during the reigns of King George VI and Queen Elizabeth II.

Reverse

The reverse of the medal remained unchanged through all versions of the obverse and bears the Royal Air Force eagle with outstretched wings, surmounted by the crown and with the inscription "FOR LONG SERVICE AND GOOD CONDUCT" around the circumference.

Clasp

The Clasp bears the image of an eagle with outstretched wings, surmounted by the crown. In undress uniform a silver rosette on the ribbon bar denotes the award of the clasp.

Ribbon

The ribbon is 32 millimetres wide with a 3 millimetres wide white band, a 13 millimetres wide dark blue band, a 13 millimetres wide crimson band and a 3 millimetres wide white band.

== Versions ==
=== King George V ===
The first version of the medal has a raised rim and shows King George V bareheaded, facing left. It is inscribed "GEORGIVS V BRITT: OMN: REX ET IND: IMP:" around the perimeter. The initials "BM" on the truncation of the King's neck are those of the designer of the obverse, Bertram Mackennal, an Australian sculptor.

The medal has a swiveling ornamented scroll pattern suspender, attached to the medal with a single-toe claw and a horizontal pin through the upper edge of the medal, with double scroll claw supports on the medal rim.

=== King George VI ===
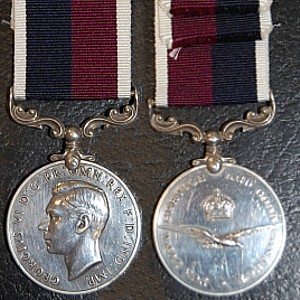
King George VI version 1

The first King George VI version appeared after he succeeded to the throne on 11 December 1936. The medal also has a raised rim and shows the King bareheaded and facing left. The medal is inscribed "GEORGIVS VI D: G: BR: OMN: REX F: D: IND: IMP." around the perimeter.

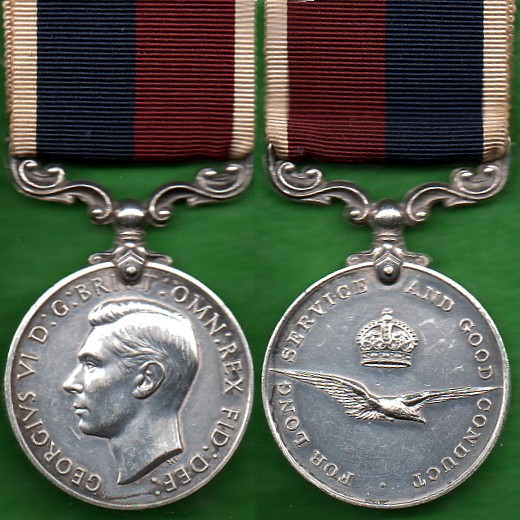
King George VI version 2

A second King George VI version, inscribed "GEORGIVS VI D: G: BRITT: OMN: REX FID: DEF:" around the perimeter, appeared c. 1948 following the granting of independence to India, when the King's official title changed from "Monarch of the United Kingdom and the Dominions of the British Commonwealth, and Emperor of India" to "Monarch of the United Kingdom and the Dominions of the British Commonwealth, and Monarch of India".

The initials "HP" below the truncation of the King's neck are those of the designer of the obverse of the medal, Thomas Humphrey Paget, an English medal and coin designer.

Both versions of the medal have non-swiveling ornamented scroll pattern suspensions, attached to the medal with a single-toe claw and a horizontal pin through the upper edge of the medal, with double scroll claw supports on the medal rim.

=== Queen Elizabeth II ===
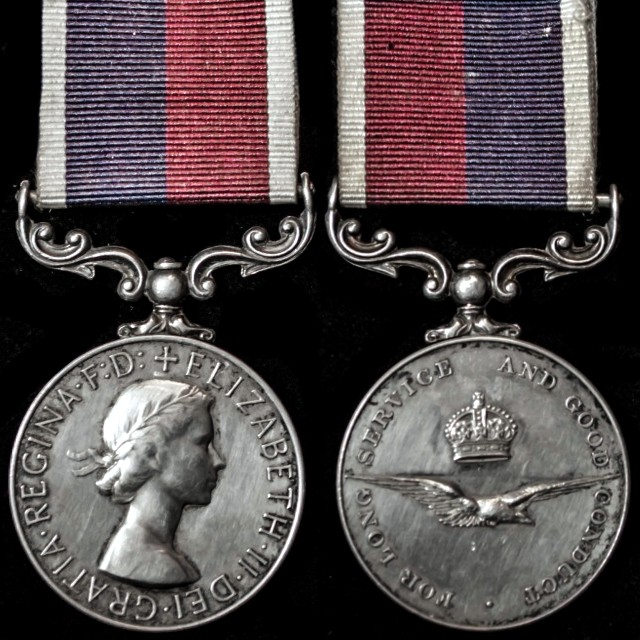
Queen Elizabeth II version 1

The first Queen Elizabeth II version appeared after she succeeded to the throne on 6 February 1952. The medal shows a bareheaded effigy of the Queen, facing right and wearing a laurel crown, and is inscribed "ELIZABETH•II•DEI•GRATIA•REGINA•F:D:", reading around from a cross at the top. The effigy was designed by Mary Gillick and was also used on general-circulation coinage for the United Kingdom from 1953, as well as in cameo form on British commemorative postage stamps since 1966.

A second Queen Elizabeth II version was introduced in 1980, with the Queen depicted wearing the Saint Edward crown, the traditional British coronation crown.

The Queen Elizabeth II versions reverted to swiveling suspenders. While the double scroll claw supports of the earlier versions were retained, the suspender is affixed to the top of the medal rim without the hitherto used claw and pin attachment. However, some version one medals were issued with the same attachment as the King George VI version.

== Dominion Air Forces ==
=== Royal Australian Air Force ===
The Royal Air Force Long Service and Good Conduct Medal ceased to be awarded to members of the Royal Australian Air Force in 1975, when it was replaced by the National Medal (Australia) in the Australian system of honours and awards.

=== Royal Canadian Air Force ===
The Royal Canadian Air Force Long Service and Good Conduct Medal was instituted on 1 August 1944. Until 31 August 1957 it could be awarded for eighteen years service and good conduct to Permanent Force warrant officers, non-commissioned officers and airmen of the Royal Canadian Air Force who had enrolled prior to 1 September 1939, when the medal was superseded by the Canadian Forces' Decoration.

The Royal Canadian Air Force order that announced the institution of the medal stated that it would have a bar inscribed "CANADA", similar to the Medal for Long Service and Good Conduct (Canada). However, since no such medal was ever struck, the Royal Air Force Long Service and Good Conduct Medal was awarded to Canadians instead during the period concerned. Altogether 487 of these medals, most of them the King George VI versions, were awarded to Canadians between 1 August 1944 and 31 August 1957.

=== Royal New Zealand Air Force ===
From 1947 until the Royal New Zealand Air Force Long Service and Good Conduct Medal was instituted in 1985, the Royal Air Force Long Service and Good Conduct Medal was also awarded to non-commissioned officers and airmen of the Royal New Zealand Air Force who had completed fifteen years of unblemished service.

== Notable recipients ==
- Charity Bick GM, at age 16 the youngest ever recipient of the George Medal.
- Wilfred Bowes OBE, Special Investigation Branch who investigated the "Great Escape" murders by the Gestapo in 1944.

== Proposed discontinuation ==
In March 2015 a proposed intention to introduce a single new long service medal for all three Service Arms was announced by the United Kingdom's Government, to replace the Medal for Long Service and Good Conduct (Military), the Naval Long Service and Good Conduct Medal (1848) and the Royal Air Force Long Service and Good Conduct Medal. The proposed medal was to be awarded after fifteen years of service, regardless of rank, and while the good conduct element of the award criteria would have remained, it would only have applied to the last five years of the fifteen-year aggregate time served requirement. With this medal officers, who have had no medallic recognition for long service unless they were commissioned after serving at least twelve years in the ranks, would have also been rewarded for their dedication.

== Extended eligibility ==
In September 2016, it was formally announced in Defence Instruction 2016DIN09-023, that plans for a new medal had been shelved and the current RAF LS&GC would continue with revised regulations, that all RAF Officers will become eligible for its award effective from 1 October 2016 with the eligibility being backdated to 29 July 2014 (published in Chapter 5 to JSP761 (Honours and Awards in the Armed Forces) and Queen's Regulations of the Royal Air Force.

== Bibliography ==
- Brooks, Chris; Routledge, Jim (2009). The Royal Air Force Long Service and Good Conduct Medal, 1919-1941. Orders & Medals Research Society. ISBN 978-0-95-392077-8.
- Hayward; Birch; Bishop (2006). British Battles and Medals (7th ed.). London: Spink. ISBN 1-902040-77-5.
