= Indian Long Service and Good Conduct Medal (for Indian Army) =

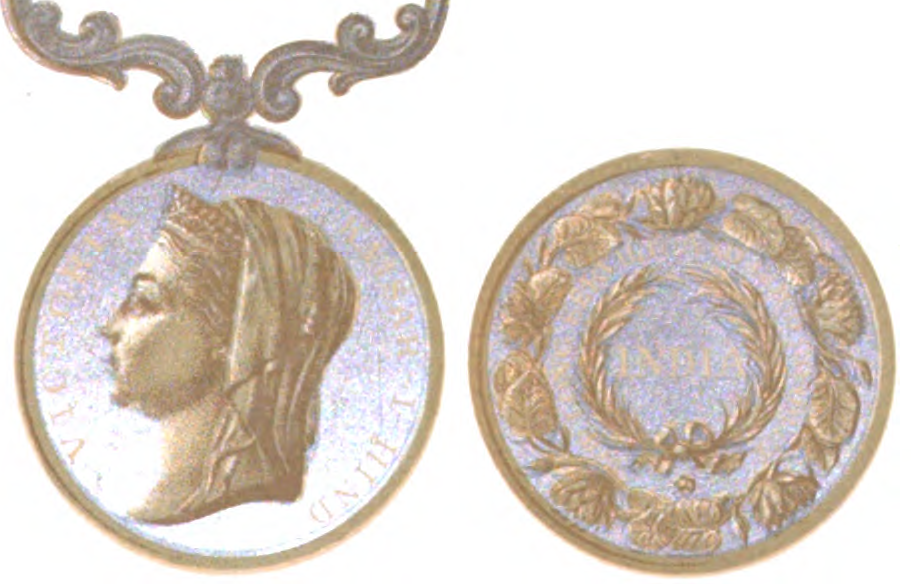
- Obverse and reverse of Victoria version of the medal
- Type: Service medal
- Awarded for: Long and efficient service
- Presented by: British Raj
- Eligibility: Indians in the British Indian Army
- Status: No longer awarded
- Established: 1888
- Final award: 1947
- First version of ribbon Later version of the ribbon

Order of Wear
- Next (higher): Medal for Long Service and Good Conduct (Ulster Defence Regiment)
- Next (lower): Royal West African Frontier Force Long Service and Good Conduct Medal

The Indian Long Service and Good Conduct Medal was a long service medal awarded to Indian other ranks in the British Indian Army.

== History ==
Established on 27 July 1888, the Indian Long Service and Good Conduct Medal could be awarded to sowars, sepoys, as well as lance-dafadars, naiks, and lance-naiks of the British Indian Army. To be awarded the medal men must have served at least 20 years and had performed in a meritorious manner, with no courts-martial, and having been entered in the defaulters book fewer than five times. He must also have been recommended by his commanding officer.

== Appearance ==
The Indian Meritorious Service Medal is a circular silver medal 1.4 inches in diameter, designed by L.C. Wyon. The obverse depicts the effigy of the reigning sovereign. Around the edge is the inscription of the sovereign's regnal name and the title KAISAR-I-HIND in the earlier versions. The later versions of the medal's obverse have the standard Royal Titles. The reverse depicts an outer wreath of lotus flowers and leaves surrounding an inner wreath of palm leaves. Between the two wreaths is the inscription FOR LONG SERVICE AND GOOD CONDUCT. Inside the inner wreath is the word INDIA.

== Works cited ==
- Mayo, John Horsley (1897). Medals and Decorations of the British Army and Navy, Volume 2. London: A. Constable.
