= Medal for Long Service and Good Conduct (Ulster Defence Regiment) =

- Ribbon of the medal
- Type: Long service medal
- Awarded for: 15 years efficient service
- Presented by: United Kingdom
- Eligibility: Full-time members of the Ulster Defence Regiment
- Status: No longer awarded
- Established: 1982

Order of Wear
- Next (higher): Royal Air Force Long Service and Good Conduct Medal
- Next (lower): Indian Long Service and Good Conduct Medal (Indian Army)

The Medal for Long Service and Good Conduct (Ulster Defence Regiment) was a long service medal of the United Kingdom, established in 1982. The medal was awarded to full-time members of the Ulster Defence Regiment upon the completion of 15 years of efficient service.

== Criteria ==
The medal was awarded to those full-time soldiers of the permanent cadre of the Ulster Defence Regiment who has completed 15 years of irreproachable service and were recommended for the medal by their commanding officer. Those members who completed a further 15 years of irreproachable service were eligible for a clasp to the medal to denote this subsequent award.

Officers who were full-time members of the permanent cadre of the Ulster Defence Regiment and had served 12 years in the ranks were eligible award of the medal upon completion of 15 years of irreproachable service. Those officers who already held the medal and completed a further 15 years of irreproachable service were eligible for a clasp, provided seven of those years were in the ranks.

== Appearance ==
The medal is circular, 36 mm in diameter, made of silver colored metal. The obverse bears the effigy of Queen Elizabeth II wearing the Imperial State Crown. Surrounding the effigy along the edge of the medal is the inscription ELIZABETH II DEI GRATIA REGINA FID.DEF. The reverse bears the text FOR LONG SERVICE AND GOOD CONDUCT, in 4 lines on plain background. The medal is suspended from a non-swiveling, ornately designed bar with scrolled supports, the bar bears the letters, U.D.R on a textured background. The medal hangs from a 32 mm wide purple ribbon, with a centre stripe 3 mm wide in dark green, and 3 mm wide white edge stripes.
