= Medal for Long Service and Good Conduct (Military) =

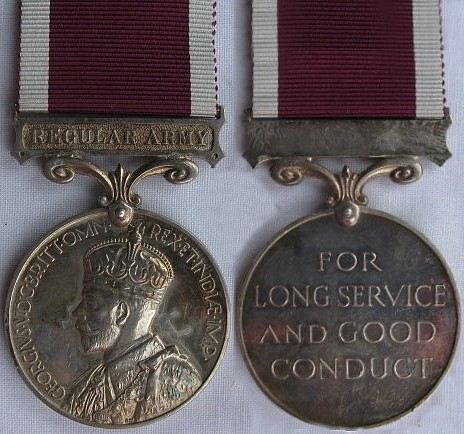
- King George V version
- Type: Military long service medal
- Awarded for: 18 years service until 1977; 15 years service from 1977
- Country: United Kingdom
- Presented by: the Monarch of the United Kingdom and the British Dominions, and Emperor of India
- Eligibility: UK Armed Forces other ranks Conditionally to officers from 1947; Female soldiers from 1955; British officers from 2016
- Clasps: Instituted in 1944 for 15 years additional service 10 years service from 2016
- Status: Currently awarded
- Established: 1930
- First award: 1930
- Ribbon Bar

Order of wear
- Next (higher): Accumulated Campaign Service Medal
- Equivalent: Medal for Long Service and Good Conduct (South Africa)
- Next (lower): Naval Long Service and Good Conduct Medal (1830)
- Related: Army Long Service and Good Conduct Medal

The Medal for Long Service and Good Conduct (Military) is a medal awarded to regular members of the armed forces. It was instituted by King George V in 1930 and replaced the Army Long Service and Good Conduct Medal as well as the Permanent Forces of the Empire Beyond the Seas Medal. The medal was originally awarded to Regular Army warrant officers, non-commissioned officers and men of the UK Armed Forces. It also had a number of territorial versions for the Permanent Forces of the British Dominions. The eligibility criteria were relaxed in 1947 to also allow the award of the medal to officers who had served a minimum period in the ranks before being commissioned. Since 2016, the eligibility was widened to include officers who had never served in the ranks, and so the medal can now be awarded to all regular members of the British Armed Forces who meet the required length of service.

== Overview ==
In the complex British honours system, there were distinct awards for officers and men of the Navy, Army and Air Force, and separate awards for the Regular Force or Reserve components. Regular Force officers were not eligible for any long service awards since, as they held a commission, they were expected to serve honourably and for a long period of time. Reserve Force officers were eligible for various long service decorations that granted them the use of post-nominal letters, while Reserve Force other ranks were eligible for various long service and good conduct medals, but without post-nominals.

== Predecessors ==
The United Kingdom's Army Long Service and Good Conduct Medal was instituted by King William IV in 1830.

In 1895 Queen Victoria authorised Colonial governments to adopt, amongst others, this medal and to award it to other ranks of their own permanent military forces. Territories that took advantage of the authorisation include Canada, Cape of Good Hope, India, Natal, New South Wales, New Zealand, Queensland, South Australia, Tasmania, Victoria and, from 1902, the Commonwealth of Australia. Each territorial version of the medal had the name of the respective territory inscribed in a curved line above the inscription on the reverse.

In 1910 the Permanent Forces of the Empire Beyond the Seas Medal was instituted as a single common award to supersede these territorial versions of the Army Long Service and Good Conduct Medal.

== Institution ==
On 23 September 1930 the Medal for Long Service and Good Conduct (Military) was instituted by King George V as a single medal for the regular other ranks of the British Army and those of all Permanent Forces of the British Empire. The new medal, which replaced the Army Long Service and Good Conduct Medal as well as the Permanent Forces of the Empire Beyond the Seas Medal, once again had various territorial versions, this time in the form of subsidiary titles inscribed on a bar attached to the suspender of the medal rather than on the medal's reverse.

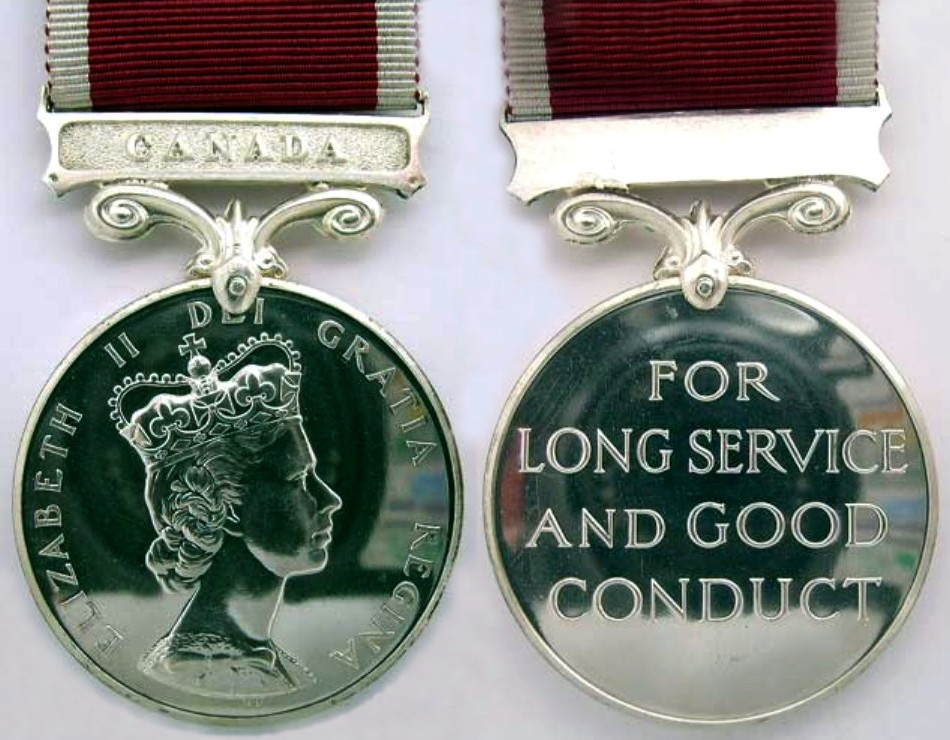
The Medal for Long Service and Good Conduct with the Canada clasp

These subsidiary titles are "Regular Army" on the bar of the medal for the British Army and the name of the dominion country on the bars of the medals for Australia, Canada, India and New Zealand. Apart from the bars, all but one of the medals are identical. The Medal for Long Service and Good Conduct (South Africa), introduced in December 1939, is the exception since the inscriptions on its bar as well as on the reverse of the medal are bilingual, in Afrikaans and English on the bar and in English and Afrikaans on the medal reverse. Instead of the name of the country, the South African medal displays the all-capital inscriptions "Staande Mag" and "Permanent Force" in two lines on the suspender bar.

== Award criteria ==
When it was instituted, the medal could be awarded to Regular Force warrant officers, non-commissioned officers and men of the British Army after eighteen years of unblemished service. Qualifying service included service rendered by a soldier whilst under the age of eighteen, while service in West Africa and in certain parts of the Anglo-Egyptian Sudan was reckoned two-fold as qualifying service.

The medal and the clasp could initially only be awarded to men, but on 9 February 1955 the criteria were amended by Queen Elizabeth II to also apply to women members of the Armed Forces of the United Kingdom and of the Permanent Forces of member countries of the Commonwealth.

The qualifying period was reduced to fifteen years with effect from 1 December 1977. Possibly at the same time, the criteria in respect of reckonable service whilst under the age of eighteen was amended to be from date of attestation or age 17½, whichever is later.

Eligibility

The Medal for Long Service and Good Conduct (Military) may be awarded to members of the UK Armed Forces who have completed eighteen (later fifteen) years of reckonable service. However, there were a number of offences which would normally preclude award of the medal and awards are only made after a thorough check of a soldier's service record. The award of the medal required the recommendation of the individual's commanding officer and it could therefore only be awarded to serving personnel. Eligibility criteria were amended in 2016

Clasp

On 26 August 1944 a clasp to the medal was instituted by King George VI. The clasp could be awarded to holders of the Medal for Long Service and Good Conduct (Military) for additional periods of eighteen (later fifteen) years of good service, reckoned from the date of the Army Order that announced their respective earlier awards. Holders of the earlier Army Long Service and Good Conduct Medal were not awarded the clasp, but were instead awarded the Medal for Long Service and Good Conduct (Military) in addition to the discontinued earlier medal.

The reckoning method was amended by King George VI on 1 May 1947 to be from the qualifying date for the award of the Long Service and Good Conduct Medal (Military) or the Army Long Service and Good Conduct Medal.

In October 2016, regulations were changed allowing the award of the clasp after an additional 10 years of service that meets conduct criteria.

Officers

Regular Force officers were traditionally not eligible for any long service awards. From 1 May 1947 British Army officers also became eligible for the award of the medal, but only if at least twelve of their eighteen (later fifteen) years of qualifying service had been in the ranks before being commissioned and provided that the conduct requirements for the award of the medal had been met.

Also from that date, an officer became eligible for the award of the clasp or, for holders of the discontinued Army Long Service and Good Conduct Medal, the award of the Medal for Long Service and Good Conduct (Military) in addition to the earlier medal, if at least nine of the eighteen years of the second qualifying period of service had been in the ranks and provided that the conduct requirements had been met.

Effective October 2016, officers who were serving in the Regular Army on or after 29 July 2014 are eligible for award of the Long Service and Good Conduct Medal. To be eligible for the medal officers must have had 15 years Regular Army service with a clear disciplinary record. Subsequent service of 10 years is recognized with a clasp, so long as the individual has continued to have a clear disciplinary record.

== Order of wear ==
In the order of wear prescribed by the British Central Chancery of the Orders of Knighthood, the Medal for Long Service and Good Conduct (Military) and its territorial versions rank on par with the Army Long Service and Good Conduct Medal and the Permanent Forces of the Empire Beyond the Seas Medal that it had replaced. It takes precedence after the Accumulated Campaign Service Medal and before the Naval Long Service and Good Conduct Medal (1830).

== Description ==
The medal was struck in silver and is a disk, 36 millimetres (1.42 inches) in diameter.

Obverse

The obverse of the medal shows the effigy of the reigning monarch. Two versions of the medal each were produced during the reigns of King George VI and Queen Elizabeth II. All versions of the medal have the same ornamented scroll pattern suspender, attached to the bottom of a bar inscribed "REGULAR ARMY" and affixed to the medal with a single-toe claw and a horizontal pin through the upper edge of the medal.

Reverse

The reverse of the medal remained unchanged through all versions of the obverse. It is smooth, with a raised rim, and bears the inscription "FOR LONG SERVICE AND GOOD CONDUCT" in four lines. The reverse of the bar is smooth and undecorated on all versions.

Clasp

The Clasp displays the image of the Army Crest. In undress uniform a silver rosette on the ribbon bar denotes the award of the clasp.

Ribbon

The ribbon is identical to the one that was introduced for the Army Long Service and Good Conduct Medal in June 1916. It is 32 millimetres wide and crimson or sometimes reddish violet, edged with 3 millimetres wide white bands.

== Versions ==
King George V

The first version of the medal, depicted at the head of the article, has a raised rim and the obverse shows the crowned effigy of King George V, in Coronation robes and facing left. It is inscribed "GEORGIVS•V•D•G•BRITT•OMN•REX•ET•INDIÆ•IMP•" around the perimeter.

King George VI

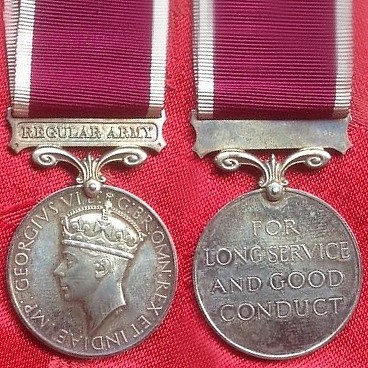
King George VI version 1

The first King George VI version appeared after he succeeded to the throne on 11 December 1936. The medal also has a raised rim and shows the crowned effigy of the King, facing left. The medal is inscribed "GEORGIVS VI D: G: BR: OMN: REX ET INDIÆ: IMP:" (George VI, by the Grace of God, of all the British, King, and Emperor of India) around the perimeter, reading from the eight o'clock position.

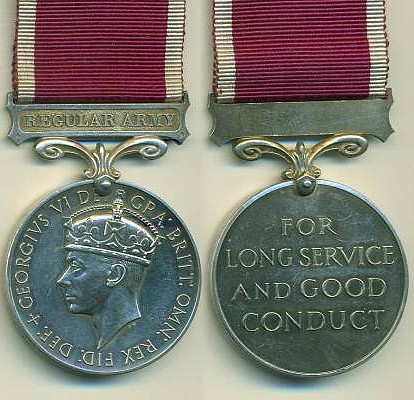
King George VI version 2

A second King George VI version appeared in 1949 following the granting of independence to British India & Pakistan, when the wording of King's official title changed from "of all of the British, King, Defender of the Faith, and Emperor of India" to "of all of the British, King, Defender of the Faith", as he independently became King of India and King of Pakistan. This version is inscribed "GEORGIVS VI DEI: GRA: BRITT: OMN: REX FID: DEF:" around the perimeter, reading from a cross at the eight o'clock position.

Queen Elizabeth II

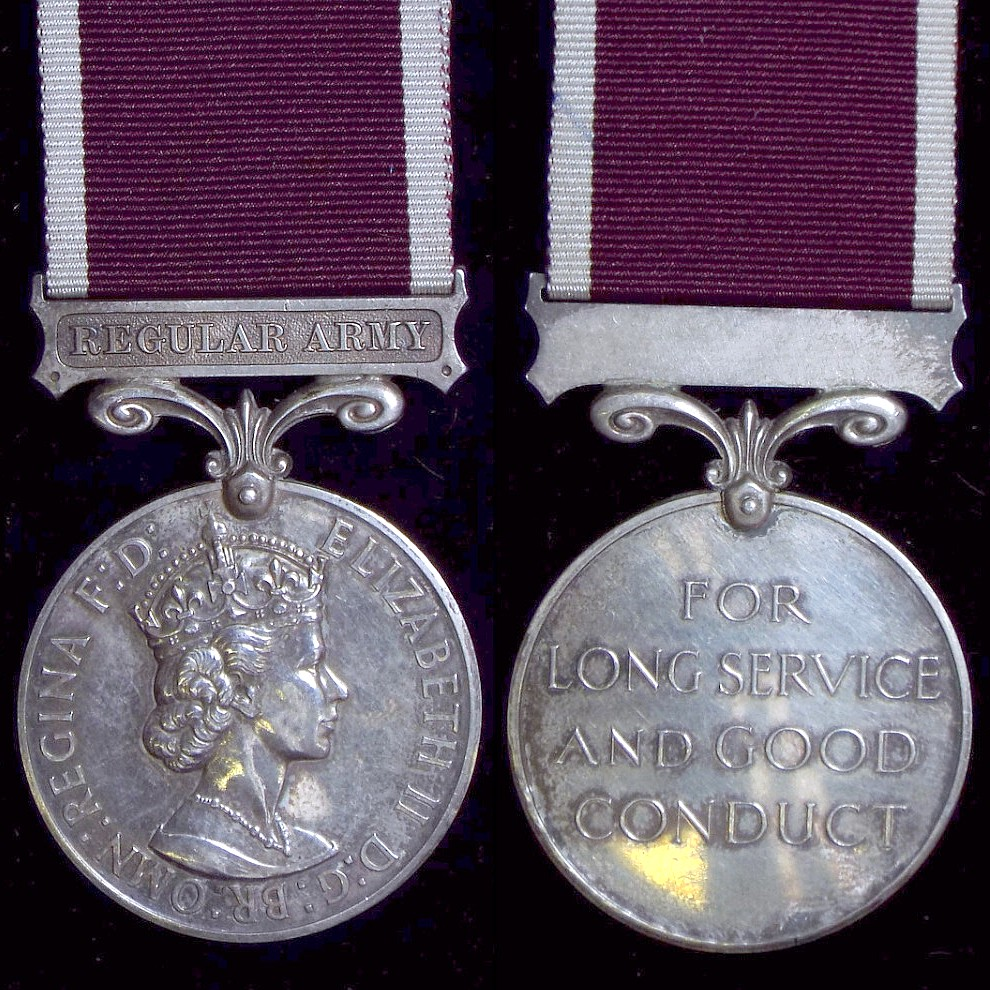
Queen Elizabeth II version 1

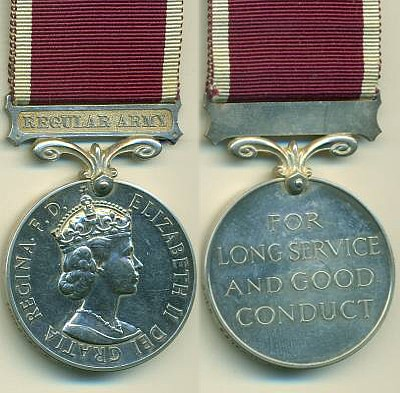
Queen Elizabeth II version 2

The first Queen Elizabeth II version appeared after she succeeded to the throne on 6 February 1952. The medal shows a crowned effigy of the Queen, facing right, and is inscribed "ELIZABETH II D: G: BR: OMN: REGINA F: D:", reading around from the top. The effigy was designed by sculptor Cecil Thomas OBE and was used on a number of medals.

After her Coronation on 2 June 1953, a second Queen Elizabeth II version was introduced in 1954, with the same effigy as before but inscribed "ELIZABETH II DEI GRATIA REGINA. F. D.", also reading around from the top, after the change in her official style and title was made after her coronation to read Elizabeth II, by the grace of God, Queen, Defender of the Faith. This version of the medal remained in use until 1980.

== Notable recipients ==
- Ian Bailey MM, who received the Military Medal for actions during the Falklands War of 1982.
- Moira Cameron, the first woman Yeoman Warder at the Tower of London.
- Keith Payne VC AM, Australian recipient of the Victoria Cross.
- Kim Hughes GC, British Army George Cross recipient.

== 2016 revision ==
In October 2016, it was announced that the Long Service and Good Conduct Medals of the respective services would be extended to all personnel irrespective of rank, who meet the requirements of award. The key requirement is any period of 15 years' service in the Regular Army starting from the day of attestation irrespective of age without any entries on the individual's disciplinary record. This change is retroactive to those officers still serving in the Regular Army from 29 July 2014. Additionally, the period required for the award of the clasp has been reduced from 15 to 10 years with a back date to 29 July 2014 for officers and to 1 October 2016 for other ranks.

== Bibliography ==
- Hayward; Birch; Bishop (2006). British Battles and Medals (7th ed.). London: Spink. ISBN 1-902040-77-5.
- McCreery, Christopher (2010). The Canadian Forces' Decoration (PDF). Ottawa: Department of National Defence. ISBN 978-1-100-54293-5. OCLC 779682934.
