= Accumulated Campaign Service Medal =

Accumulated Campaign Service Medal and Accumulated Campaign Service Medal 2011
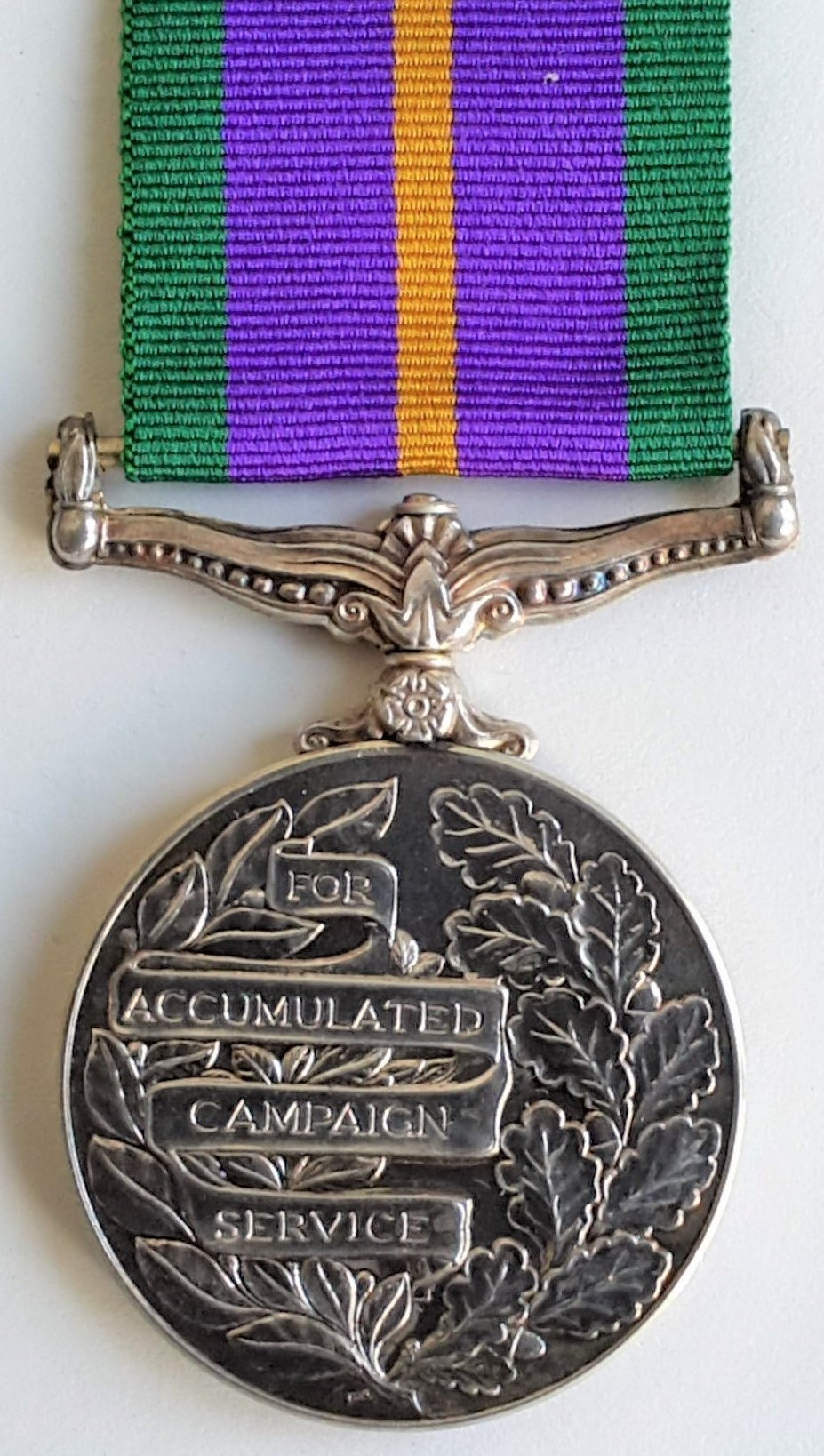
- Reverse of medal with ribbon of the Accumulated Campaign Service Medal
- Type: Campaign Service Medal
- Awarded for: Accumulated Campaign Service Medal: 1,080 days campaign service before 1 Jan 2008; Accumulated Campaign Service Medal 2011: 720 days campaign service
- Description: Silver, 36mm diameter
- Presented by: UK and Commonwealth
- Eligibility: British and Commonwealth forces
- Campaign: Various
- Status: Currently awarded
- Established: January 1994; Amended 1 July 2011
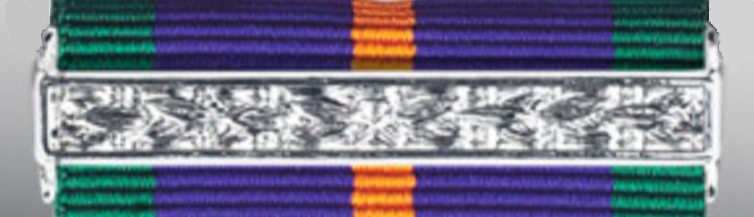
- Ribbon: Accumulated Campaign Service Medal Ribbon: Accumulated Campaign Service Medal 2011 Clasp for a second award

Precedence
- Next (higher): Meritorious Service Medal (United Kingdom)
- Next (lower): Naval Long Service and Good Conduct Medal (1848) or Medal for Long Service and Good Conduct (Military) or Royal Air Force Long Service and Good Conduct Medal
- Related: General Service Medal (1962)

The Accumulated Campaign Service Medal and the Accumulated Campaign Service Medal 2011 are medals awarded by King Charles III to members of his Armed Forces to recognise long campaign service. The original Accumulated Campaign Service Medal, instituted in January 1994, was awarded to holders of the General Service Medal (1962) who had completed 36 months (1,080 days) of accumulated campaign service. The replacement Accumulated Campaign Service Medal 2011 is now currently awarded to holders of various campaign service medals who have completed 24 months (720 days) of campaign service.

== Description ==
The Royal Warrant for the Accumulated Campaign Service Medal specifies that

... the medal shall be circular in form and be silver, that it shall bear on the obverse the Crowned Effigy of the Sovereign and on the reverse the description "FOR ACCUMULATED CAMPAIGN SERVICE" set within a four part ribbon surrounded by a branch of oak leaves with laurel and olive leaves woven through the motto ribbon.

The medal ribbon is the purple and green ribbon of the General Service Medal (1962) with an added central gold stripe denoting excellence. The Accumulated Campaign Service Medal 2011 uses the same medal, but with a ribbon with two central gold stripes.

The Accumulated Campaign Service Medal is hallmarked on the rim to the right of the suspension fixing. The 2011 version of the medal is not hallmarked.

== Criteria ==
The Accumulated Campaign Service Medal was originally awarded to holders of the General Service Medal (1962) who had completed accumulated campaign service of 36 months since 14 August 1969. A clasp was awarded for each further period of 36 months campaign service. When the ribbon only is worn, a silver rosette is worn on the ribbon for each clasp, with a single gold rosette indicating four clasps. Criteria for part-time members of the Royal Irish Regiment were similar but with 1,000 days replacing 36 months.

The Accumulated Campaign Service Medal is currently awarded to those who have completed 1,080 days, aggregated by 1 January 2008, in theatres which would have merited a General Service Medal 1962 (e.g. for operations in Northern Ireland or air operations in Iraq), an Operational Service Medal for Afghanistan, an Operational Service Medal for Sierra Leone or an Iraq Medal.

The criteria for the medal were substantially revised in 2011. The qualifying period was reduced from 1,080 to 720 days (36 to 24 months), the medal was retitled the 'Accumulated Campaign Service Medal 2011' and the ribbon was redesigned. Qualification for the Accumulated Campaign Service Medal 2011 was also restricted to only those serving from 1 January 2008.

In 2019, the MOD Medal Office paused awarding the ACSM 2011 after concerns were raised that the Ministry of Defence was incorrectly applying the ‘double medaling’ principle to restrict qualification. The MOD initiated a review of the qualifying criteria and the results were made public on 30 July 2021. The review restored the previous less restrictive criteria and also announced that serving and former Service personnel, previously deemed ineligible for the ACSM 2011, can re-apply.

As at 11 February 2015, the Ministry of Defence had issued 50,548 ACSM 1994 medals and clasps and 10,280 ACSM 2011 medals and clasps.
