= Naval Long Service and Good Conduct Medal (1848) =

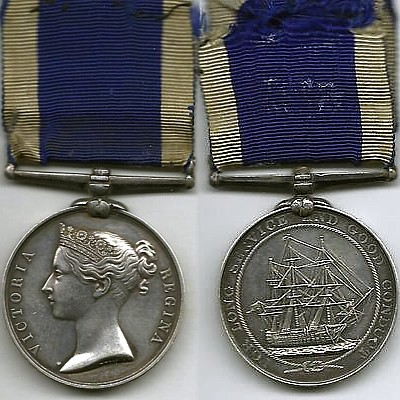
- 1848 Queen Victoria version, with 1½" wide suspender and ribbon
- Type: Military long service medal
- Awarded for: 21, 10, 15 years service, as prescribed from time to time
- Country: United Kingdom
- Presented by: the Monarch of the United Kingdom of Great Britain and Ireland
- Eligibility: Naval Other Ranks, Officers from the ranks from 1981, all Officers from 2016
- Status: Current
- Established: 1848
- First award: 1848
- Ribbon Bars until and from 1874

Order of wear
- Next (higher): Medal for Long Service and Good Conduct (Military)
- Equivalent: Naval Long Service and Good Conduct Medal (1830)
- Next (lower): Medal for Meritorious Service (Royal Navy 1918-1928)

The Naval Long Service and Good Conduct Medal (1848) is a long service medal awarded to regular members of His Majesty's Naval Service. It was instituted by Queen Victoria to replace the Naval Long Service and Good Conduct Medal (1830), and could be awarded to other ranks and men serving in the Royal Navy and Royal Marines. Since 2016, after a number of changes in eligibility, all regular members of the Royal Navy and Royal Marines (ratings, marines and officers) who have completed fifteen years of reckonable service can be awarded the medal.

== Origin ==
The Naval Long Service and Good Conduct Medal (1830) was introduced on 20 November 1830 and ratified by King William IV on 24 August 1831. This medal, known as the "anchor type", could only be awarded to selected other ranks, ratings or marines after altogether 21 years of service and good conduct. It remained in use until 1847, ten years into the reign of Queen Victoria.

== Institution ==
The Naval Long Service and Good Conduct Medal (1848) was instituted by Queen Victoria to replace the Naval Long Service and Good Conduct Medal (1830). The new medal could still only be awarded to other ranks, ratings and marines, but from March 1981 it could also be awarded to officers who had completed at least twelve years of service in the ranks before being commissioned.

== Award criteria ==
When it was instituted in 1848, the medal could be awarded after 21 years of unblemished service. The qualifying period was reduced to ten years in 1874, and then increased again to fifteen years, as per Fleet Circular No 36L dated 21 November 1884.

Generic text to describe the long service medal was recycled for each of the three services on the Ministry of Defence website. Whilst the qualifying period was reduced in 1977 from eighteen to fifteen years service for the Army and RAF, this reduction was not applicable for the Royal Navy. This comment was erroneously appearing on their website from 12 December 2012 to 7 December 2016. As a consequence, other online sources indicate the qualifying period for the Royal Navy was extended to eighteen years, and that the time served requirement was finally reduced to fifteen years with effect from 1 December 1977. This is not borne out by neither primary sources nor by the service histories of the medal recipients. The regulations were last updated on 1 October 2016.

Eligibility

Any other rank, rating or marine who had completed fifteen years of reckonable service and who held three good conduct badges, became eligible to receive the medal. Since there were a number of offences which would normally preclude the award of the medal, awards were only made after a thorough check of a sailor's service record. The award of the medal required the recommendation of the individual's commanding officer and it could therefore only be awarded to serving personnel. Along with the medal, a recipient was paid a gratuity.

The first good conduct badge could be awarded upon completion of two years service, with the required standard of conduct not falling below "Very Good". The second could be granted after a further four years, or six years total service, and the third after another six years, or twelve years total service. Further good conduct badges could be awarded every six years. When in uniform, a large inverted chevron was worn on the lower left forearm to denote the award of a good conduct badge, with subsequent awards represented by additional chevrons.

Clasp

During the reign of King George V a clasp to the medal was introduced. The clasp can be awarded for an additional fifteen years of service, subject to the same requirements as those for the award of the medal.

Officers

Regular Force officers were not previously eligible for any long service awards since, as they held a commission, they were expected to serve honourably and for a long period of time. From March 1981 officers also became eligible for the award of the medal, but only if at least twelve of the fifteen years of service had been in the ranks and provided that the conduct requirements for the award of the medal had been met. Also from that date, an officer became eligible for the award of the clasp if at least twenty-two of the thirty years of his or her service had been in the ranks and provided that the conduct requirements had been met. This changed in October 2016 when officers who had not previously served in the ranks were also granted eligibility, providing their record was clear of disciplinary entries.

== Order of wear ==
In the order of wear prescribed by the British Central Chancery of the Orders of Knighthood, the Naval Long Service and Good Conduct Medal (1848) ranks on par with the Naval Long Service and Good Conduct Medal (1830) that it replaced. It takes precedence after the Medal for Long Service and Good Conduct (Military) and before the Medal for Meritorious Service (Royal Navy 1918–1928).

== Description ==
The medal was struck in silver and is a disk, 36 millimetres (1.42 inches) in diameter, slightly larger than the earlier "anchor type" medal of 1830, which is 34 millimetres (1.34 inches) in diameter.

Obverse
The obverse of the medal shows the effigy of the reigning monarch. Since the medal was instituted in 1848, seven obverse versions have been awarded, with two versions each during the reigns of Queen Victoria and King George V.

Reverse
The reverse shows a starboard broadside view of HMS Victory, a three-masted ship of the line and Lord Nelson's flagship at the Battle of Trafalgar in 1805. The ship is encircled by a rope tied with a reef knot at the foot and with the words "FOR LONG SERVICE AND GOOD CONDUCT" around the circumference between the rope and the raised rim.

The design on the reverse has remained virtually unaltered through all versions of the medal. Generally speaking, the two early Queen Victoria versions with a wide suspender had a slightly different reverse with a larger flag at the masthead of the ship, while the later narrow suspender and subsequent versions had a more triangular flag.

Clasp
The clasp bears a laurel leaf design. When the ribbon bar alone is worn, a silver rosette on the ribbon denotes the award of a clasp.

Ribbon
The original 1848 ribbon, worn with the original wide suspender version of the medal, is 38 millimetres wide and Navy blue, with 7 millimetres wide white edges. Along with the second version of the medal with its narrower suspender that was introduced in 1874, the ribbon dimensions were changed to 32 millimetres wide and Navy blue, with 6½ millimetres wide white edges.

== Versions ==
=== Queen Victoria ===
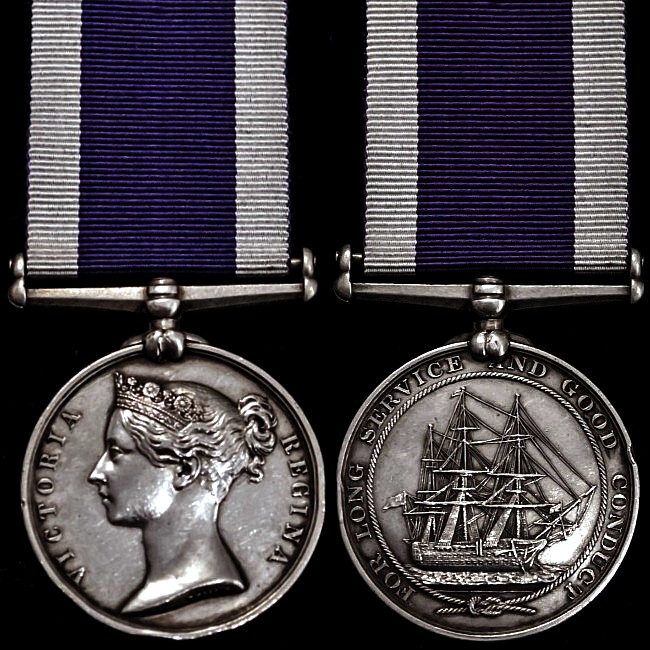
1874 Queen Victoria version, with 1¼" wide suspender and ribbon

The first version of the medal has the effigy of Queen Victoria on the obverse and was designed by William Wyon, the chief engraver at the Royal Mint from 1828 until his death. The reverse has the image of HMS Victory that would remain virtually unchanged through all subsequent versions of the medal. The details of the recipient were either engraved or, after 1877, impressed around the edge of the medal, showing his service number, rank and name and also the name of a Naval rating's ship or shore establishment, or a Marine's division.

Two versions of the Queen Victoria obverse were produced. An estimated 100 of the medals have the year "1848" in relief below Queen Victoria's bust. These medals were struck in error using the die for the Naval General Service Medal (1847).

Two versions of suspender were also produced. The first medals, including the dated ones, had a straight suspender that was wide enough to accept the 38 millimetres (1½ inches) wide ribbon. The suspender was changed to a narrower width in 1875, to accept a new 32 millimetres (1¼ inches) wide ribbon. Both types of suspender were swivelling and were affixed to the medal by means of a double-toe claw and a horizontal pin through the upper edge of the medal.

=== King Edward VII ===
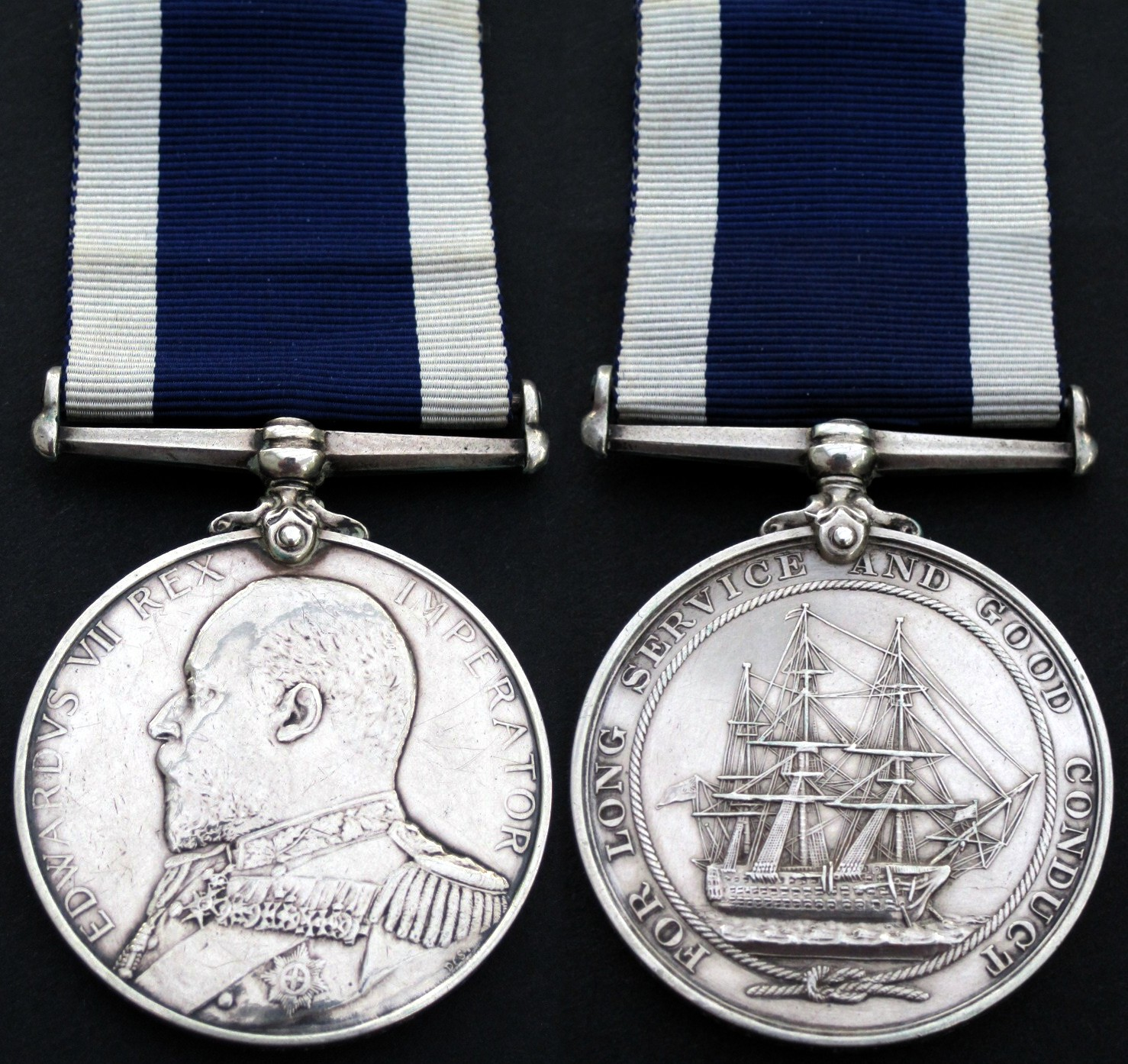
King Edward VII version

The King Edward VII version appeared after his succession to the throne on 22 January 1901. The obverse has a raised rim, with the King's effigy in Admiral's uniform, facing left and inscribed "EDWARDVS VII REX IMPERATOR" around the perimeter. The initials "De S" below the epaulette on the King's left shoulder are those of the engraver, British medallist George William de Saulles.

The medal has a swivelling bar suspension, attached to the medal with a single-toe claw and a horizontal pin through the upper edge of the medal, with double scroll claw supports on the medal rim.

=== King George V ===
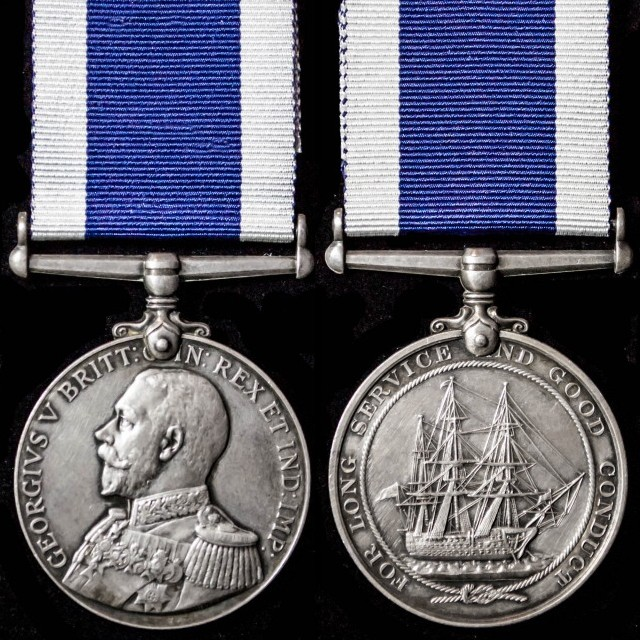
King George V version 1

King George V succeeded to the throne on 6 May 1910. Two versions of obverse were awarded during his reign, both with raised rims. The first version shows the King in Admiral's uniform, facing left and inscribed "GEORGIVS V BRITT: OMN: REX ET IND: IMP:" around the perimeter.

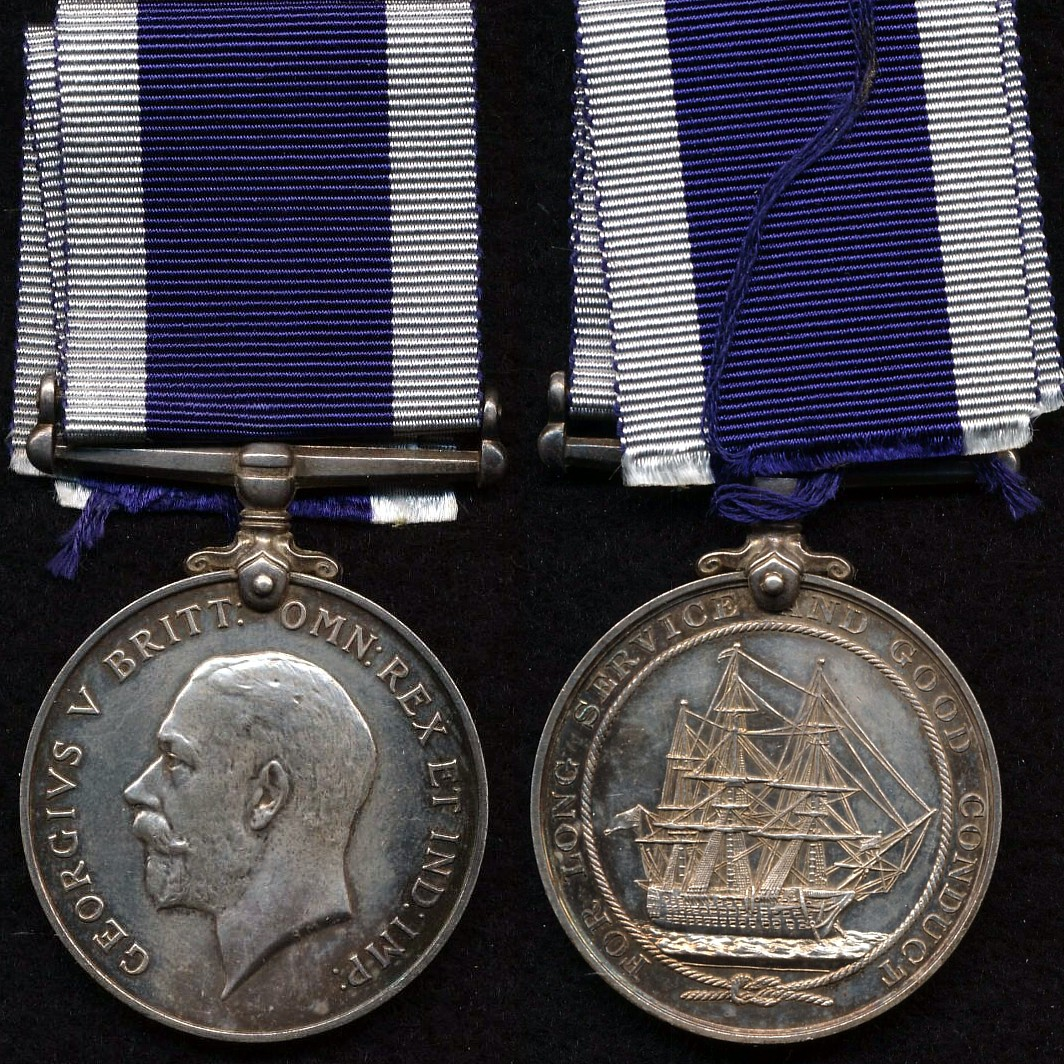
King George V version 2

The second version with the coinage effigy appeared in the 1920s and shows the King bareheaded and facing left. The inscription around the perimeter on this version of the medal is the same as on the first. The initials "BM" on the truncation of the King's neck are those of the designer of the obverse, Bertram Mackennal, an Australian sculptor.

Both versions have non-swivelling bar suspensions, attached to the medal with a single-toe claw and a horizontal pin through the upper edge of the medal, with double scroll claw supports on the medal rim.

=== King George VI ===
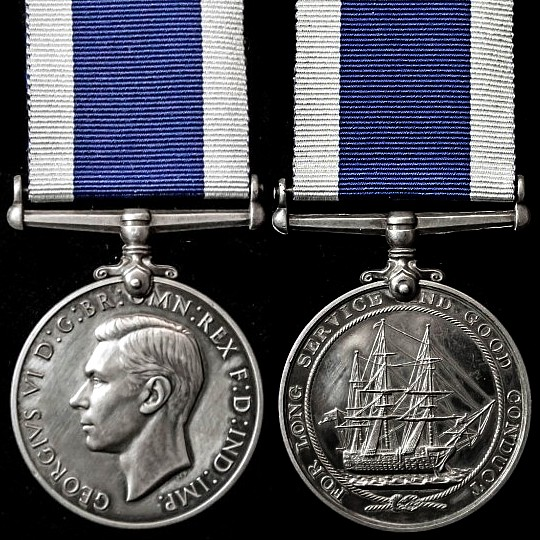
King George VI version

The King George VI version appeared after he succeeded to the throne on 11 December 1936. The medal also has a raised rim and shows the King bareheaded and facing left. The medal is inscribed "GEORGIVS VI D: G: BR: OMN: REX F: D: IND: IMP." around the perimeter.

The initials "HP" below the truncation of the King's neck are those of the designer of the obverse of the medal, Thomas Humphrey Paget, an English medal and coin designer.

This version of the medal also has a non-swiveling bar suspension, attached to the medal with a single-toe claw and a horizontal pin through the upper edge of the medal, with double scroll claw supports on the medal rim.

=== Queen Elizabeth II ===
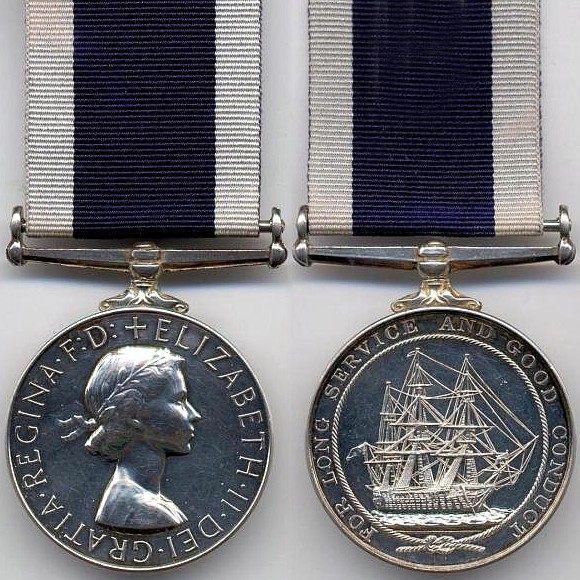
Queen Elizabeth II version

The Queen Elizabeth II version appeared after she succeeded to the throne on 6 February 1952. The medal shows a bareheaded effigy of the Queen, facing right, and is inscribed "ELIZABETH•II•DEI•GRATIA•REGINA•F:D:", reading around from a cross at the top. The effigy was designed by Mary Gillick and was also used on general-circulation coinage for the United Kingdom from 1953, as well as in cameo form on British commemorative postage stamps since 1966.

The Queen Elizabeth II version reverted to swivelling suspenders. While the double scroll claw supports of the earlier versions were retained, the suspender is attached to the top of the medal rim without the hitherto used claw and pin attachment.

== Notable recipients ==
- Claude Choules, the last surviving Royal Navy combat veteran of World War I.
- Bill Stone, British Royal Navy World War I and World War II Veteran.

== 2016 revision ==
In October 2016, it was announced that the Long Service and Good Conduct Medals of the respective services would be extended to all personnel serving in the Regular Forces, including officers, who meet the requirements of award. The medal will be awarded for any period of fifteen years service free of any disciplinary entries, regardless of rank. This change is retroactive to those officers still in the Regular Forces from 29 July 2014. Additionally, clasps will be awarded for an additional 10 years of eligible service with a back date to 29 July 2014 for officers and to 1 October 2016 for other ranks.

== Bibliography ==
- Cole-Mackintosh, Ronnie (2009). The Designers and Engravers of British Official Medals. The Orders and Medals Research Society. ISBN 978-09539207-6-1.
- Douglas-Morris, Kenneth (2010) [1991]. Naval long service medals 1830-1990. Uckfield, East Sussex: Naval & Military Press. ISBN 978-1-84-342174-0.
- McCreery, Christopher (2010). The Canadian Forces' Decoration (PDF). Ottawa: Directorate of Honours and Recognition, National Defence. OCLC 779682934.
