= Naval Long Service and Good Conduct Medal (1830) =

- Medal to RICHARD SPARLING, Serjeant Royal Marines, H.M.S. VESTAL, 22 Years
- Type: Military long service medal
- Awarded for: Selected ratings after 21 years service and good conduct
- Country: United Kingdom
- Presented by: the King of the United Kingdom of Great Britain and Ireland, and King of Hanover
- Eligibility: Naval ratings
- Status: Discontinued in 1847
- Established: 14 August 1831
- First award: 20 November 1830
- Final award: 27 November 1847

Highlights
- Total: Approximately 740
- Ribbon Bar

Order of wear
- Next (higher): Medal for Long Service and Good Conduct (Military)
- Equivalent: Naval Long Service and Good Conduct Medal (1848)
- Next (lower): Medal for Meritorious Service (Royal Navy 1918-1928)

The Naval Long Service and Good Conduct Medal (1830) of the United Kingdom was introduced in 1830 and ratified by King William IV in 1831. It could only be awarded to selected Navy ratings after altogether 21 years of service and good conduct. The medal remained in use until 1847, when it was replaced by the Naval Long Service and Good Conduct Medal (1848).

== Institution ==
The Naval Long Service and Good Conduct Medal (1830), formally instituted on 24 August 1831 by King William IV, the "Sailor King", was first awarded on 20 November 1830. Since the medal was created for award to Navy ratings, its institution was historic considering that ratings had never, up to that time, been considered worthy of a medal for any reason. The medal remained in use until 1847, ten years into the reign of Queen Victoria. The last award was on 27 November 1847, before it was replaced by the Naval Long Service and Good Conduct Medal (1848).

== Award criteria ==
The medal could be awarded to selected Royal Navy and Royal Marines ratings after altogether 21 years of service and irreproachable behaviour, (Note: The following is stated in the Order in Council dated 24 August 1831. Those 'having served above twenty-one years, who shall have behaved invariably well in such, and be in possession of Certificates of good conduct throughout his former service, and be in the Captain's opinion in every respect deserving to be so rewarded; when the Person or Persons so reported by the Captain or Commander shall be paid a Gratuity... And all men receiving the said Gratuity will be afterwards entitled to wear a Silver Medal the size of a half-crown, at the third button-hole of their jackets') counted from the man's twentieth birthday for Navy ratings and from his eighteenth for Marines. Seamens' service was usually non-continuous as a result of the then current enlistment practice.

Before 1853 and when the country was not at war, the Royal Navy was a part-time establishment, commissioned officers excepted. In the case of ratings, only a few seamen gunners were allowed to enlist full-time from 1832, when they were offered renewable five-year or seven-year engagements, while all other ratings were casually enlisted.

A rating, referring to the seaman's rate or task on the ship, was enlisted onto a ship's complement when the ship was commissioned. The medal was awarded according to a quota system to only a few selected and qualified ratings of a ship's company, with the number of awards based on the total complement of the ship, and only when the ship was decommissioned and its ratings paid off at the end of a period of time, usually a minimum of three years. Along with the medal, a recipient was paid a gratuity of £15 for petty officers or sergeants Royal Marines, and £5 for seamen and marines.

As a result of the quota system for award, only a small number of medals could be awarded each time a ship was decommissioned. In general, about one in one hundred ratings of a ship's complement, upon recommendation by the Captain, was awarded the medal upon decommissioning. Many eligible men who had the time qualification did not receive the medal if the ship they had been serving on was too small to justify medals for all of its qualified ratings and many recipients were therefore considered lucky if they managed to receive the medal. During the eighteen years it was in use, only approximately 740 of these medals were awarded.

Officers were ineligible for the medal and it was only awarded to Warrant Officers on rare occasions.

== Order of wear ==
Inverted reverse medal to RICHARD BOND, Master at Arms, H.M.S. ISIS, 25 Years

Bar suspender medal to WILLIAM JAGO, Carpenter's Mate, H.M.S. VICTORY, 21 Years

Cracked die medal to JEREMIAH McCOY, Gunners Mate, H.M.S. RACER, 24 Years

In the order of wear prescribed by the British Central Chancery of the Orders of Knighthood, the Naval Long Service and Good Conduct Medal (1830) ranks on par with the Naval Long Service and Good Conduct Medal (1848) that replaced it. It takes precedence after the Medal for Long Service and Good Conduct (Military) and before the Medal for Meritorious Service (Royal Navy 1918–1928).

== Description ==
The Naval Long Service and Good Conduct Medal (1830), commonly known as the "anchor type" long service medal, remained unchanged during the reigns of King William IV and Queen Victoria. The medal was struck in silver and is a disk, 34 millimetres (1.34 inches) in diameter, somewhat smaller than subsequent Victorian medals.

Obverse

The obverse bears a fouled Naval anchor or "killick", surmounted by a Queen's crown and surrounded on both sides by an oak wreath. The entire is encircled by a rope inside the raised rim of the medal.

Reverse

The reverse is inscribed "FOR LONG SERVICE AND GOOD CONDUCT" around the circumference, reading around from the bottom, and the inscription is encircled by a rope inside the raised rim of the medal. In the centre of the disk is an encircled space to allow the recipient's details to be engraved. Approximately nine "inverted reverse" medals are known to exist, where the medal was struck with one of the dies 180° out of position and on which the inscription is read around from the top, illustrated alongside by the medal awarded to Richard Bond.

The engraving of the recipient's details include his name in block capital letters, his rate in flowing script, the name of his ship in block capital letters and his number of years of service in flowing script. With the exception of Able Seaman, ranks are never shown on these medals.

Suspender

Suspension is by a small ring passing through a hole at the top of the medal. Since the tiny ring did not readily accept the 1 1/2 inches (38 millimetres) wide plain Navy blue ribbon, many recipients had the suspension altered to a loop, large ring or one of a variety of bar suspenders, illustrated alongside and in the main picture by the medals awarded to Richard Sparling, Richard Bond and William Jago.

== Recipients ==
Only approximately 740 of these medals were awarded during the eighteen years from 1830 to 1847. The first award was to John Herring on 20 November 1830 and the last to William Bone on 27 November 1847.

== Discontinuation ==
Part of the reason for the discontinuation of the anchor type medal was that the reverse die disintegrated as a result of repeated use. The flaws in the die can be discerned on the later versions of the medal, awarded from c. 1844, and are very noticeable in the lower left quadrant of the reverse on medals awarded in 1846 and 1847, illustrated alongside by the medal awarded to Jeremiah McCoy.

The Naval Long Service and Good Conduct Medal (1848) that replaced the anchor type medal was of a completely new design, 36 millimetres (1.42 inches) in diameter, with the effigy of Queen Victoria on the obverse, the image of a three-masted man-of-war on the reverse and a new Navy blue ribbon with white edges.

== Notes and citations ==
Notes

Citations

== Bibliography ==
- The Navy List, Corrected to the 20th March 1834. London: John Murray. 1834.
- Cole-Mackintosh, Ronnie (2009). The Designers and Engravers of British Official Medals. The Orders and Medals Research Society. ISBN 978-09539207-6-1.
- Douglas-Morris, Kenneth (2010) [1991]. Naval long service medals 1830-1990. Uckfield, East Sussex: Naval & Military Press. ISBN 978-1-84-342174-0.
