= Central Chancery of the Orders of Knighthood =

The Central Chancery of the Orders of Knighthood, or simply the Central Chancery, is an office of the Lord Chamberlain's department within the Royal Household of the Sovereign of the United Kingdom. It is responsible for the administration of orders of chivalry and some aspects of honours in general. It does not deal with nominations or decisions on appointments, but rather administers the appointment procedures and investitures, and provides the insignia. It is a small office, with eight staff in 2019.

== History and duties ==
The office was established by King Edward VII in April 1904 in response to the recommendations of a committee set up in 1902 to consider changes to the administration of the honours system. The new office replaced the ad hoc arrangements which had evolved over time. The Central Chancery is headed by a Secretary, who is assisted by an Assistant Secretary.

Since 1991, the Secretary of the Central Chancery has been the same individual who serves as Assistant Comptroller to the Lord Chamberlain's Office, and currently serves ex-officio as the registrar of the Royal Victorian Order and of the Order of the British Empire.

Since 1931, the office has been held by retired and active duty officers of the Armed Forces.

The current secretary, Lt.Col. Stephen Segrave, took part in the Royal Procession at the 2023 Coronation, leading the contingent representing orders of chivalry and gallantry award holders.

== List of secretaries ==
- Sir Francis Morgan Bryant CB CVO CBE ISO (1916–1931)
- Rear Admiral Philip John Hawkins Lander Row CB CVO (1931–1932)
- Commander Dudley Colles KCB KCVO OBE (1932–1936)
- Major Sir Henry Hudson Fraser Stockley KCVO OBE (1936–1946)
- Brigadier Sir Ivan de la Bere KCVO CB CBE (1946–1960)
- Major General Sir Cyril Harry Colquhoun KCVO CB OBE (1960–1968)
- Major General Sir Peter Bernard Gillett KCVO CB CBE (1968–1979)
- Major General Sir Desmond Hind Garrett Rice KCVO CBE (1980–1989)
- Lieutenant Colonel Sir Walter Ross GCVO OBE GCStJ DL (1989–1991)
- Lieutenant Colonel Anthony Charles McClure Mather CBE (1991–1999)
- Lieutenant Colonel Robert Guy Cartwright LVO (1999–2005)
- Lieutenant Colonel Sir Alexander Fergus Matheson of Matheson, 8th Baronet LVO DL (2005–2014)
- Lieutenant Colonel Sir James Michael Vernon KCVO (2014–2019)
- Lieutenant Colonel Stephen Segrave (2019–present)
