= King's Medal for Champion Shots =

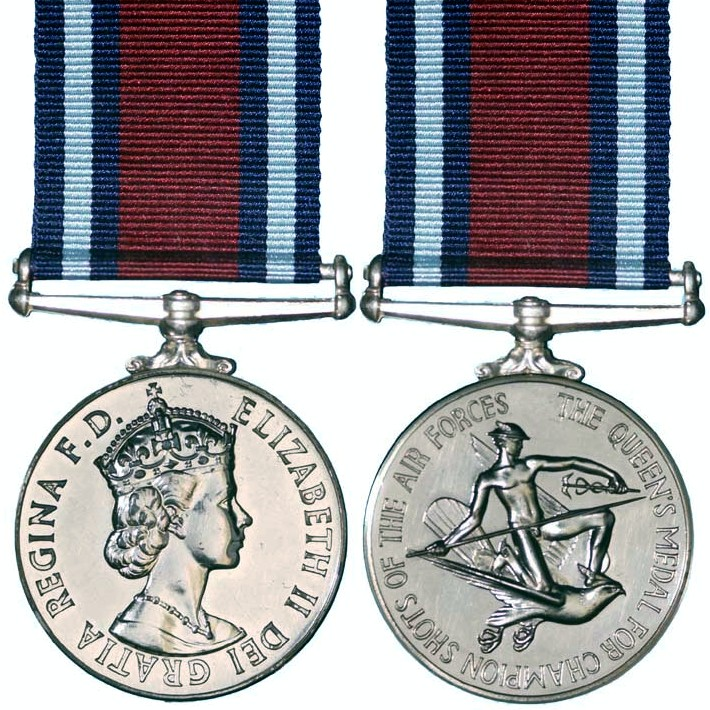
Queen's Medal for Champion Shots of the Air Forces

King's Medal for Champion Shots are a family of medals, awarded to the champions of small arms firing competitions held in several British Commonwealth countries and in several armed forces branches. The King's Medals should not be confused with the King's Prize, which is a rifle competition contested during the NRA Imperial Meeting at Bisley.

Notable medals in this family are:

- King's Medal for Champion Shots in the Military Forces (British, Dominion & Colonial Armies)
- King's Medal for Champion Shots of the Air Forces (British, Dominion & Colonial Air Forces)
- King's Medal for Champion Shots of the New Zealand Naval Forces (New Zealand Navy)
- King's Medal for Champion Shots of the Royal Navy and Royal Marines (British Naval forces)
- King's Medal for Champion Shot (Canadian Armed Forces)
- Champion Shots Medal (Australia) (Australian Defence Force)
