= Queen's Medal =

The Queen's Medal may refer to:

- Queen's Medal for Champion Shots, several UK and Commonwealth awards
- The Queen's South Africa Medal, awarded to military personnel who served in the Second Boer War between October 11, 1899, and May 31, 1902
- The Queen's Medal for Music
- Queen's Gold Medal for Poetry
- The Royal Medals of the Royal Society in London
- Queen's Medal, awarded at the Royal Military Academy Sandhurst
- Queen's Medal, awarded at the Royal Military College, Duntroon

== See also ==
- King's Medal (disambiguation)
