= King's Medal for Champion Shots of the Royal Navy and Royal Marines =

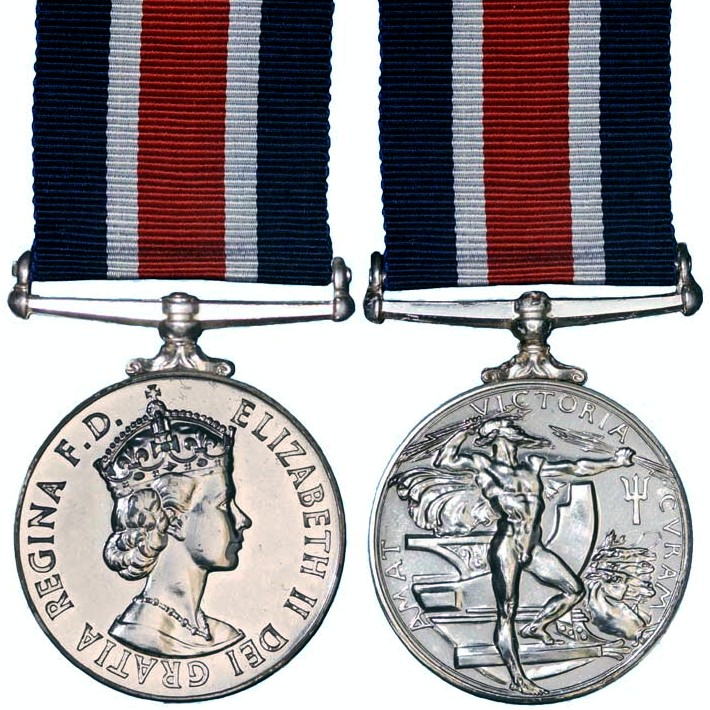
- Type: Military marksmanship medal
- Country: United Kingdom
- Presented by: the Monarch of the United Kingdom and the Commonwealth realms
- Eligibility: All ranks
- Clasps: Displaying year of award
- Status: Current
- Established: 1966
- First award: 1966
- Ribbon bar

Order of wear
- Next (higher): Northern Ireland Home Service Medal
- Next (lower): King's Medal for Champion Shots of the New Zealand Naval Forces
- Related: Naval Good Shooting Medal

The King's Medal for Champion Shots of the Royal Navy and Royal Marines was instituted in 1966. The medal is a Naval counterpart of the King's Medal for Champion Shots in the Military Forces and the King's Medal for Champion Shots of the Air Forces and is identical to the Queen's Medal for Champion Shots of the New Zealand Naval Forces that had been instituted in 1958. One medal can be awarded annually to the champion shot of a small-arms marksmanship competition, held by the Royal Navy and Royal Marines.

The reverse of the medal and the ribbon are identical to those of the Naval Good Shooting Medal, instituted by King Edward VII in 1903 as an award for outstanding naval gunnery and discontinued in 1914. In 1955 that medal's reverse and ribbon had been used for the Queen's Medal for Champion Shots of the New Zealand Naval Forces.

== Origin ==
The Medal for the Best Shot in the British Army, Infantry, was instituted by Queen Victoria in 1869 and was awarded, from 1870 to 1882, to the best shot of the annual Army shooting competition. In 1923 the medal was re-introduced by King George V and designated the King's Medal for Champion Shots in the Military Forces. This was followed by the institution of the Queen's Medal for Champion Shots of the Air Forces by Queen Elizabeth II in 1953. The two medals were awarded to the champions of annual Army and Air Force small-arms marksmanship competitions respectively, at central meetings in the United Kingdom and some countries of the British Commonwealth.

In 1955 New Zealand began to award a Naval version of these two medals, of which the reverse and the ribbon are identical to those of the Naval Good Shooting Medal of 1903. This medal was retrospectively approved by Royal Warrant in 1958.

== Institution ==
The Queen's Medal for Champion Shots of the Royal Navy and Royal Marines was instituted by Queen Elizabeth II in 1966 to replace the Naval Good Shooting Medal for naval gunnery champions, the awarding of which had been discontinued in 1914.

Every medal is awarded with a clasp, inscribed with the year of award and attached to the medal's suspension bar. Holders of the medal who qualify for a subsequent award, are awarded a clasp only, to be worn on the ribbon of the original medal and attached to the original or previous clasp. When medals are not worn, the award of second or further clasps are denoted on the ribbon bar by a silver rosette to denote the award of each additional clasp.

== Award criteria ==
The Medal may be competed for by any serving officers and ratings in the Royal Navy and any serving officers, non-commissioned officers and men of the Royal Marines. It is awarded annually to the winner of a competition, organised under service rifle championship conditions.

== Order of wear ==
In the order of wear prescribed by the British Central Chancery of the Orders of Knighthood, the King's Medal for Champion Shots of the Royal Navy and Royal Marines takes precedence after the Northern Ireland Home Service Medal and before the King's Medal for Champion Shots of the New Zealand Naval Forces.

== Description ==
The medal was struck in silver and is a disk, 36 millimetres (1.42 inches) in diameter, with a raised rim on each side and suspended from a straight silver bar.

Obverse

The obverse bears the crowned effigy of Queen Elizabeth II and is circumscribed "ELIZABETH II DEI GRATIA REGINA F. D.", reading around from the top. The effigy was designed by sculptor Cecil Thomas OBE and was also used on a number of other medals.

Reverse

The reverse is identical to that of the Naval Good Shooting Medal and King's Medal for Champion Shots of the New Zealand Naval Forces. It bears a representation of a naked and cloaked Neptune, grasping thunderbolts in both hands and with his right arm drawn back in the act of hurling the missiles. Behind him is the prow of a Roman trireme, drawn by three sea horses. Above the horses, a trident is depicted on the table of the medal. The inscription is "AMAT VICTORIA CVRAM" (Victory delights in care), as required by King Edward VII. The design dates back to 1904, when the Deputy Master of the Royal Mint invited students of the Modelling School of the Royal College of Art in South Kensington to submit designs for the reverse of the Naval Good Shooting Medal. The winning design was submitted by Miss Margaret Winser, while the original die was engraved by George de Saulles.

Clasps

Since the medal can be won multiple times, each subsequent award is indicated by the award of another clasp, which displays the year of the subsequent award. The clasps are designed to be attached to the suspender and to each other with rivets, in roller chain fashion. When medals are not worn, the award of second and subsequent clasps are denoted by silver rosettes on the ribbon bar. Since it is impossible to sew more than four rosettes onto a single ribbon bar, gold rosettes were introduced to provide for situations where more than five championships have been won. One champion, Warrant Officer T.A. Sands of the Royal Marines, has already won the award six times.

Ribbon

The ribbon is 32 millimetres wide with an 8 millimetres wide dark blue band and a 3½ millimetres wide white band, repeated in reverse order and separated by a 9 millimetres wide dark crimson band. It is identical to the ribbons of the Naval Good Shooting Medal and King's Medal for Champion Shots of the New Zealand Naval Forces.

== Recipients ==
The first Naval small-arms championship to compete for the medal took place in 1966 and the first medal was won by Aircraft Articifer First Class R.J.S. Curtis of the Royal Navy. Since then, the Royal Navy Small Arms Meeting has been held annually on the National Rifle Ranges, Bisley, Surrey, except in 1991 when no competition was held as a result of the Gulf War. The competition consists of a series of combat shooting matches encompassing attack, defence, fighting in built-up area and close quarter battle shooting scenarios.

Recipients
Year	Rank	Name	Service
1966	Aircraft Artifcer 1st class	R.J.S. Curtis	Royal Navy
1967	Sgt	W.V. Holmes	Royal Marines
1968	CSgt	P. Mercier	Royal Marines
1969	Sgt	W.V. Holmes	Royal Marines
1970	Lt	R.W.J. Walker	Royal Marines
1971	Marine Engineering Artificer First Class	D.G.W. Gladwin	Royal Navy
1972	Cpl	J. Tilley	Royal Marines
1973	Chief Aircraft Artificer (AE)	T.G. Watson	Royal Navy
1974	CAA	R.J.S. Curtis	Royal Navy
1975	Lt	G. McKay	Royal Navy
1976	Cpl	B.P. Barker	Royal Marines
1977	WO2	I.M. Laidlaw	Royal Marines
1978	WO2	A.F. Wood	Royal Marines
1979	WO2	I.M. Laidlaw	Royal Marines
1980	Sgt	P.J. Hill	Royal Marines
1981	AEA1 (M)	N.J. Ball	Royal Navy
1982	Sgt	J.S. Chapman	Royal Marines
1983	Leading Weapons Electrical Mechanic (R)	C. Privett	Royal Navy
1984	Marine	C. Humphries	Royal Marines
1985	Marine	C. Humphries	Royal Marines
1986	POWEM (R)	C. Privett	Royal Navy
1987	Cpl	D.L. O'Connor	Royal Marines
1988	Marine	P. Nunn	Royal Marines
1989	Lt	P.R. Denning	Royal Marines
1990	Marine	R. Osborne	Royal Marines
1992	WO2	T.A. Sands	Royal Marines
1993	L Cpl	M.A. Cole	Royal Marines
1994	L Cpl	M.A. Cole	Royal Marines
1995	Lt (W)	Sally Roots	Royal Navy
1996	Marine	J.L. Waller	Royal Marines
1997	WO2	T.A. Sands	Royal Marines
1998	WO2	T.A. Sands	Royal Marines
1999	CPO	J. Crawford	Royal Navy
2000	Gy Sgt	D.W. Stovall	United States Marine Corps (British Royal Marines Exchange Program)
2001	WO2	T.A. Sands MBE	Royal Marines
2002	WO2	T.A. Sands MBE	Royal Marines
2003	AEM	J. Stead	Royal Navy
2004	AEM	J. Stead	Royal Navy
2005	Sgt	M.A. Cole	Royal Marines
2006	WO2	D.L. O'Connor MBE	Royal Marines
2007	CSgt	N. Gibbett	Royal Marines
2008	Cpl	J. Bloom	Royal Marines
2009	WO1 ET (WE)	J.S. Newell	Royal Navy
2010	Lt	D. Anderson	Royal Navy
2011	Lt	D. Anderson	Royal Navy
2012	Lt	D. Anderson	Royal Navy
2013		J. Bloom	Royal Marines
2014	AET	A. Fisher	Royal Navy
2015	Cpl	J. Bloom	Royal Marines
2016	Cpl	A. Kendrick	Royal Marines
2017	WO1 ET (WE)	J.S. Newell	Royal Navy
2018	Lt	J. Crawford	Royal Navy
2019	Marine	B. Wallace	Royal Marines
2022	WO1	G. Kendall	Royal Naval Reserve
2023	Sgt	T. Hughes	Royal Marines
2024	Cdr	C. Oldfield	Royal Navy
2025	Cpl	C. Wales	Royal Marines
2026	Sgt	A. Robinson	Royal Marines
