= Ulster Defence Regiment Medal =

- Ribbon of the medal
- Type: Long service medal
- Awarded for: 12 years efficient service
- Presented by: United Kingdom
- Eligibility: Part-time members of the Ulster Defence Regiment
- Post-nominals: UD (for awards to officers)
- Status: Replaced by the Northern Ireland Home Service Medal in 1992
- Established: 1982

Highlights
- Total: 1,254+

Order of Wear
- Next (higher): Volunteer Reserves Service Medal
- Next (lower): Northern Ireland Home Service Medal

The Ulster Defence Regiment Medal is a long service medal awarded to part-time members of the Ulster Defence Regiment. Established in 1982, the medal was awarded for 12 years of long and efficient service, with a bar being awarded for each subsequent six years of qualifying service. Officers awarded the medal were entitled to use the post-nominal UD. The medal was replaced by the Northern Ireland Home Service Medal in 1992. Full-time members of the Ulster Defence Regiment were eligible for the Medal for Long Service and Good Conduct (Ulster Defence Regiment) after 15 years of service.

== Appearance ==
Made of silver and 36 mm in diameter, the medal was designed by David Wynne and produced by the Royal Mint. The obverse bears a right facing effigy of Queen Elizabeth II wearing the Imperial State Crown. In relief around the edge is the inscription ELIZABETH II DEI GRATIA REGINA FID.DEF. The reverse depicts a harp, its upper left frame in the form of the head shoulders and wings of an angel. Above the harp a high relief crown. Surrounding the design are the words ULSTER DEFENCE REGIMENT. The medal hangs from a 32 mm dark green ribbon with a golden yellow centre stripe flanked by thin red stripes.

== Number awarded ==
The award of "UDR specific" long service medals had complex rules which meant that few were ever issued. The UDR medal was issued to only 1,254 personnel out of the 40,000 who served. From 1995 to 2008, 57 clasps were also issued. In that period, 35 medal applications and 3 clasp applications were refused.
