= King's Medal =

The King's Medal may refer to:

- H. M. The King's Medal, Swedish royal medal
- King's Medal of Merit, Norwegian award
- The King's South Africa Medal awarded to military personnel who served in the Second Boer War in South Africa on or after January 1, 1902, and had completed 18 months service before June 1, 1902
- The King's Medal for Courage in the Cause of Freedom and
- The King's Medal for Service in the Cause of Freedom, awarded by the British to foreign civilians who had furthered the British cause in the Second World War, especially in aiding the escape of Commonwealth personnel
- The Royal Medals of the Royal Society in London
- King's Medal (Duntroon): previously awarded to cadets at the Royal Military College, Duntroon

== See also ==
- Queen's Medal (disambiguation)
