= Northern Ireland Home Service Medal =

- Ribbon of the medal
- Type: Long service medal
- Awarded for: 12 years efficient service
- Presented by: United Kingdom
- Eligibility: Part-time members of the Ulster Defence Regiment and Royal Irish Regiment
- Established: 1992

Order of Wear
- Next (higher): Ulster Defence Regiment Medal
- Next (lower): Queen's Medal for Champion Shots

The Northern Ireland Home Service Medal is a long service medal awarded to members of the Ulster Defence Regiment and its successor the Royal Irish Regiment. Established in 1992, the medal is awarded for 12 years of long and efficient service. Clasps are awarded for six subsequent years of qualifying service. The medal replaced the Ulster Defence Regiment Medal.

== Criteria ==
The Northern Ireland Home Service Medal is awarded to recognize 12 years of part-time service with the Royal Irish Regiment. Clasps are awarded for six additional years of qualifying service. Recommendations for award of the medal are made in accordance with Royal Irish Regiment Regulations. Full-time members of the Royal Irish Regiment qualify for the Long Service and Good Conduct Medal.

== Appearance ==
The medal is silver, 36 mm in diameter. The obverse bears a right facing effigy of Queen Elizabeth II wearing the Imperial State Crown. In relief around the edge is the inscription ELIZABETH II DEI GRATIA REGINA FID.DEF. The reverse depicts a scroll with four lines of text FOR / HOME SERVICE / IN / NORTHERN IRELAND. Surmounting the scroll is a crown, with shamrocks on either side above, and laurels with a pair of harps below.
