= Naval Good Shooting Medal =

Naval Good Shooting Medal (Medal for Good Shooting (Naval))
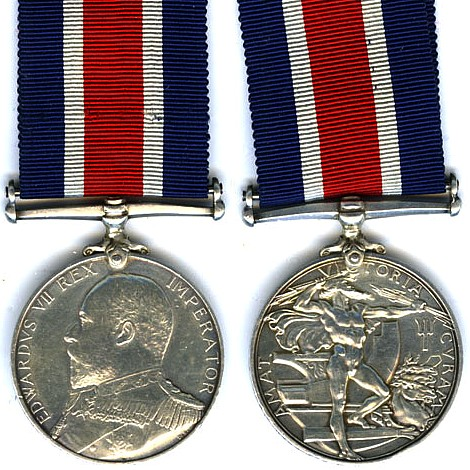
- King Edward VII version
- Type: Naval gunnery medal
- Awarded for: Naval gunnery champions
- Country: United Kingdom
- Presented by: the Monarch of the United Kingdom and the British Dominions, and Emperor of India
- Eligibility: All ranks
- Clasps: Displaying ship's name, year, bore and gun
- Status: Discontinued in 1966
- Established: 1903
- First award: 1903
- Final award: 1914
- Ribbon bar

Order of wear
- Next (higher): Colonial Auxiliary Forces Long Service Medal
- Next (lower): Militia Long Service Medal

The Naval Good Shooting Medal is a Naval gunnery medal that was instituted in 1902, for award to the gunner on each type of ship's gun in the fleet who achieved first place in the gunnery competitions held during the Annual Fleet Competitions. From 1903 to 1914 medals were awarded annually, until the competition was discontinued upon the outbreak of the First World War.

After being unawarded for 52 years, the medal was replaced in 1966 by the Queen's Medal for Champion Shots of the Royal Navy and Royal Marines, which is awarded annually to the champion shot of a Naval small-arms marksmanship competition, held by the Royal Navy and Royal Marines.

== Institution ==
The Naval Good Shooting Medal, listed in the official order of wear as the Medal for Good Shooting (Naval), was instituted by King Edward VII in 1902 as an award for outstanding Naval gunnery. In the United Kingdom the medal is unique, since all comparable medals were awarded for small-arms marksmanship championships.

== Award criteria ==
The medal was awarded to the gunner on each type of ship's gun in the fleet who achieved first place in the gunnery competitions, held during the Annual Fleet Competitions, from 1903 until the competition was discontinued upon the outbreak of the First World War in 1914. Holders of the medal who qualified for a subsequent award, were awarded a clasp to be worn on the ribbon of the original medal.

== Order of wear ==
In the order of wear prescribed by the British Central Chancery of the Orders of Knighthood, the Naval Good Shooting Medal takes precedence after the Colonial Auxiliary Forces Long Service Medal and before the Militia Long Service Medal.

== Description ==
The medal was struck in silver and is a disk, 36 millimetres (1.42 inches) in diameter, with a raised rim on each side and suspended from a straight silver bar. The recipient's number, name, rank, ship's name, year, gun bore and gun type are inscribed on the edge of the medal.

The medal's reverse design and the same ribbon was used in 1955 with the Queen's Medal for Champion Shots of the New Zealand Naval Forces and in 1966 with the Queen's Medal for Champion Shots of the Royal Navy and Royal Marines.

Obverse

The obverse bears the effigy of the reigning monarch, in the uniform of the Admiral of the Fleet. Two versions of obverse were awarded.

- The original King Edward VII version displays his effigy, facing left, and is circumscribed "EDWARDVS VII REX IMPERATOR". The initials "DES" below the epaulette on the King's left shoulder are those of the engraver, British medallist George de Saulles. The obverse is identical to that of the King Edward VII version of the Naval Long Service and Good Conduct Medal (1848).

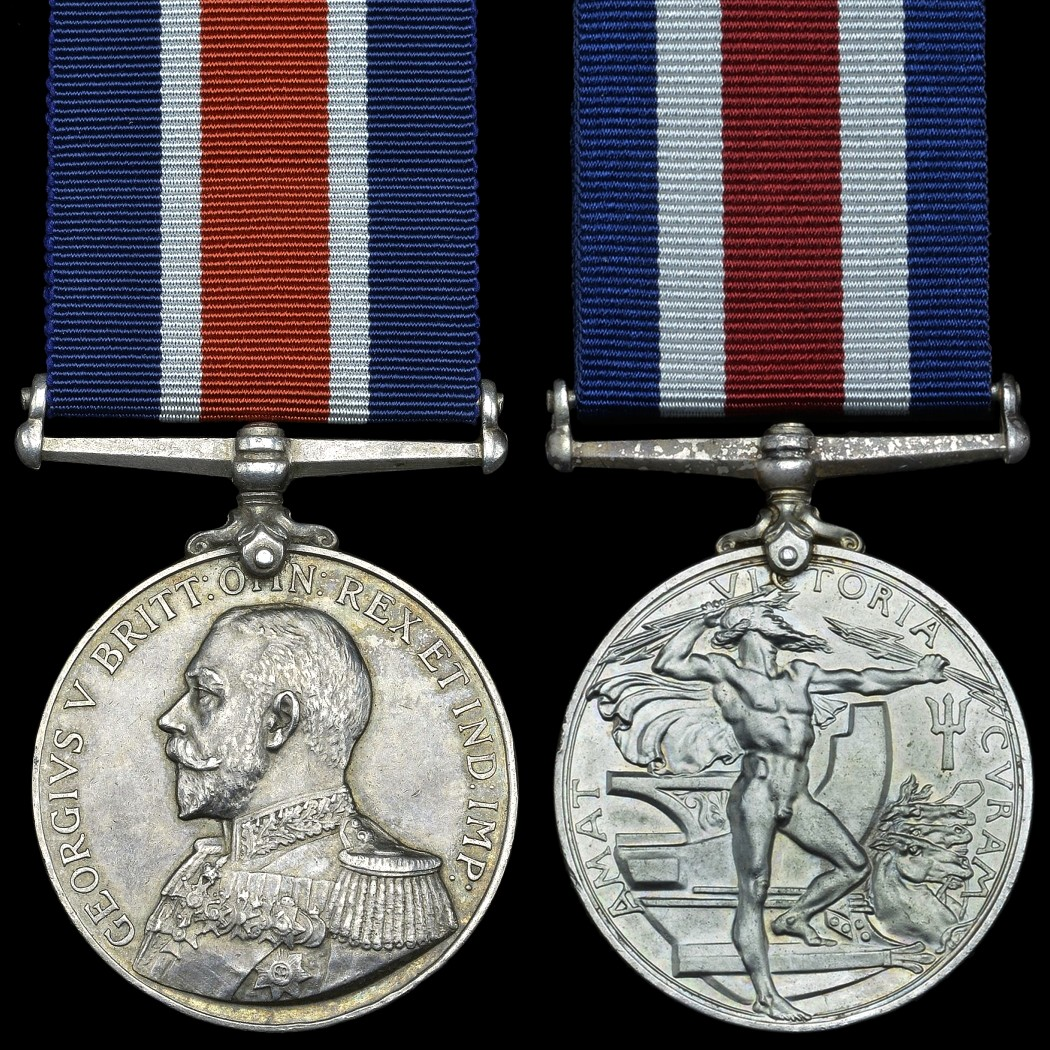
King George V version, showing both ribbon versions

- The King George V version displays his effigy, facing left, and is circumscribed "GEORGIVS V BRITT: OMN: REX ET IND: IMP:". The obverse is identical to that of the first King George V version of the Naval Long Service and Good Conduct Medal (1848).

Reverse

The reverse bears a representation of a naked and cloaked Neptune, grasping thunderbolts in both hands and with his right arm drawn back in the act of hurling the missiles. Behind him is the prow of a Roman trireme, drawn by three sea horses. Above the horses, a trident is depicted on the table of the medal. The inscription is "AMAT VICTORIA CVRAM" (Victory delights in care), as required by King Edward VII. The design came about when the Deputy Master of the Royal Mint invited students of the Modelling School of the Royal College of Art in South Kensington to submit designs for the reverse. The winning design was submitted by Miss Margaret Winser, while the die was engraved by George de Saulles.

Clasps

Since the medal could be won multiple times, each subsequent award is indicated by the award of a clasp which is inscribed with the ship's name, year, gun bore and gun type. The clasp was designed to be attached to the suspender with rivets, in roller chain fashion. The clasp depicted alongside was awarded to 208318 Able Seaman H. Croton of HMS Warrior who had won his medal in 1907, as the 1908 champion on the 7½ inch 50-calibre breech loading naval gun.

Ribbon

Two ribbon versions exist, one with wide white bands and another with narrow white bands. While both versions are seen on issued medals, the latter is the correct pattern. It is 32 millimetres wide with an 8 millimetres wide dark blue band and a 3½ millimetres wide white band, repeated in reverse order and separated by a 9 millimetres wide dark crimson band.

== Discontinuation ==
Although awarding of the medal ceased in 1914 upon the outbreak of the First World War, it was only officially discontinued in 1966. In that year, it was replaced by the Queen's Medal for Champion Shots of the Royal Navy and Royal Marines, instituted by Queen Elizabeth II for award to the winner of an annual Naval small-arms competition, organised under service rifle championship conditions.
