= King's Medal for Champion Shots of the New Zealand Naval Forces =

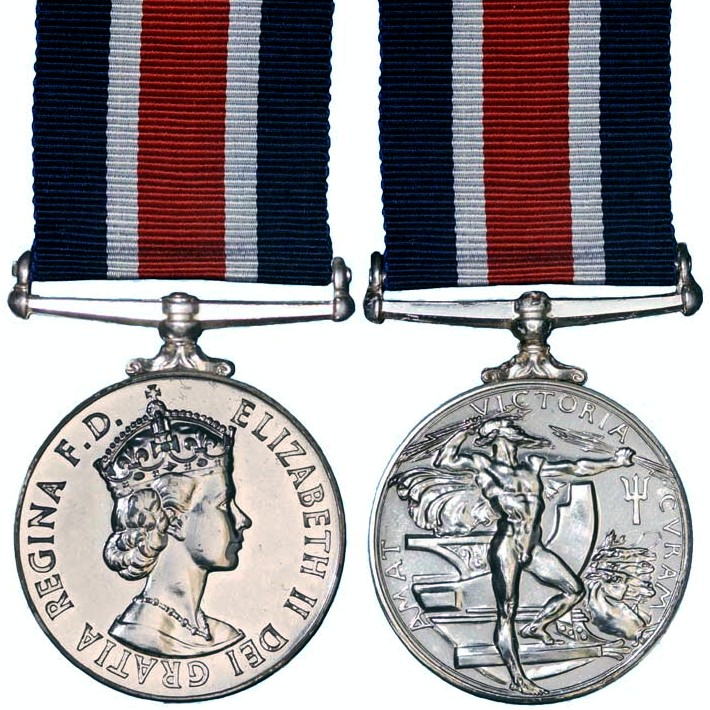
- Type: Military marksmanship medal
- Country: New Zealand
- Presented by: the Monarch of the United Kingdom and the Commonwealth realms
- Eligibility: All ranks
- Clasps: Displaying year of award
- Status: Current
- Established: 1958
- First award: 1955
- Ribbon bar

Order of wear
- Next (higher): King's Medal for Champion Shots of the Royal Navy and Royal Marines
- Next (lower): King's Medal for Champion Shots in the Military Forces
- Related: Naval Good Shooting Medal

The King's Medal for Champion Shots of the New Zealand Naval Forces was retrospectively instituted for New Zealand in 1958, the first medal having already been awarded in 1955. The medal is a Naval counterpart of the King's Medal for Champion Shots in the Military Forces and the King's Medal for Champion Shots of the Air Forces. One medal can be awarded annually to the champion shot of a small-arms marksmanship competition held by the Royal New Zealand Navy.

The reverse of the medal and the ribbon are identical to those of the Naval Good Shooting Medal, instituted by King Edward VII in 1902 as an award for outstanding naval gunnery and discontinued in 1914. In 1966 the same medal design and ribbon were to be used again for the Queen's Medal for Champion Shots of the Royal Navy and Royal Marines.

== Origin ==
The Medal for the Best Shot in the British Army, Infantry, was instituted by Queen Victoria in 1869 and was awarded from 1870 to 1882 to the best shot of the annual Army shooting competition. In 1923 the medal was re-introduced by King George V and designated the King's Medal for Champion Shots in the Military Forces. This was followed by the institution of the Queen's Medal for Champion Shots of the Air Forces by Queen Elizabeth II in 1953. The two medals were awarded to the champions of annual Army and Air Force small-arms marksmanship competitions respectively, at central meetings in the United Kingdom and some countries of the British Commonwealth.

== Institution ==
The Queen's Medal for Champion Shots of the New Zealand Naval Forces was first awarded in New Zealand in 1955 and was retrospectively instituted by Queen Elizabeth II on 30 April 1958.

Every medal is awarded with a clasp, inscribed with the year of award and attached to the medal's suspension bar. Holders of the medal who qualify for a subsequent award, are awarded a clasp only, to be worn on the ribbon of the original medal and attached to the original or previous clasp. When medals are not worn, the award of second or further clasps are denoted on the ribbon bar by a silver rosette to denote the award of each additional clasp.

== Award criteria ==
The annual competition for the medal takes place under service rifle championship conditions and the medal is awarded to the winner of the Naval Rifle Championship at that meeting. All competitors must be actual serving members of the Royal New Zealand Navy, or of the Reserve or Auxiliary Naval Forces of New Zealand.

== Order of wear ==
In the order of wear prescribed by the British Central Chancery of the Orders of Knighthood, the King's Medal for Champion Shots of the New Zealand Naval Forces takes precedence after the King's Medal for Champion Shots of the Royal Navy and Royal Marines and before the King's Medal for Champion Shots in the Military Forces.

== Description ==
The medal was struck in silver and is a disk, 36 millimetres (1.42 inches) in diameter, with a raised rim on each side and suspended from a straight silver bar.

=== Obverse ===
During the reign of Elizabeth II, the obverse bore the effigy of the Queen, and was circumscribed ELIZABETH II DEI GRATIA REGINA F. D., reading around from the top. The effigy was designed by sculptor Cecil Thomas OBE and was used on a number of medals.

=== Reverse ===
The reverse shows a representation of a naked and cloaked Neptune, grasping thunderbolts in both hands and with his right arm drawn back in the act of hurling the missiles. Behind him is the prow of a Roman trireme drawn by three sea horses. Above the horses a trident is depicted on the table of the medal. The inscription is "AMAT VICTORIA CVRAM" (Victory delights in care), as required by King Edward VII. The design dates back to 1904, when the Deputy Master of the Royal Mint invited students of the Modelling School of the Royal College of Art in South Kensington to submit designs for the reverse of the Naval Good Shooting Medal. The winning design was submitted by Miss Margaret Winser, while the original die was engraved by George de Saulles.

=== Clasps ===
Since the medal can be won multiple times, each subsequent award is indicated by the award of another clasp, which displays the year of the subsequent award. The clasps are designed to be attached to the suspender and to each other with rivets, in roller chain fashion. When medals are not worn, the award of second and subsequent clasps are denoted by silver rosettes on the ribbon bar. Since it is impossible to sew more than four rosettes onto a single ribbon bar and since several champions have won the award more than five times, gold rosettes were introduced to provide for situations where more than five championships have been won.

=== Ribbon ===
The ribbon is 32 millimetres wide with an 8 millimetres wide dark blue band and a 3½ millimetres wide white band, repeated in reverse order and separated by a 9 millimetres wide dark crimson band.

== Recipients ==
The first Naval Rifle Championship to compete for the medal took place in 1955 and the first medal was won by Chief Ordnance Artificer K.W.P. Southwell, while the record holder for the most championship victories is ten times champion shot Lieutenant Commander (Wardmaster) Neville Peach. The championship took place annually from 1955, except in 1966 and 1981, when no competition was held. The table below lists the known recipients of the medal.

Year	Rank	Initials	Surname	Squadron or Formation
1955	Chief Ordnance Artificer	K.W.P.	Southwell	
1956	Lieutenant	J.G.	Naylor	RNZNVR
1957	Lieutenant	J.G.	Naylor (2)	RNZNVR
1958	Sick Berth Petty Officer	J.G.	Peach	
1959	Sick Berth Petty Officer	J.G.	Peach (2)	
1960	Sick Berth Petty Officer	J.G.	Peach (3)	
1961	A/Wardmaster Sub Lieutenant	J.G.	Peach (4)	RNZN
1962	Wardmaster Sub Lieutenant	J.G.	Peach (5)	RNZN
1963	Wardmaster Sub Lieutenant	J.G.	Peach (6)	RNZN
1964	Wardmaster Lieutenant	J.G.	Peach (7)	RNZN
1965	Wardmaster Lieutenant	J.G.	Peach (8)	RNZN
1967	Radio Electrical Mechanic	R.L.	Brader	
1968	Chief Petty Officer	C.A.	Cain	
1969	Lieutenant Commander	F.E.J.	Mason	RNZN
1970	Lieutenant Commander (Wardmaster)	J.G.	Peach (9)	RNZN
1971	Leading Writer	R.C.	Nawisielski	HMNZS Philomel
1972	Warrant Officer	C.A.	Cain (2)	
1973	Lieutenant Commander (Wardmaster)	J.G.	Peach (10)	RNZN
1974	Petty Officer Writer	R.C.	Nawisielski (2)	HMNZS Tamaki
1975	Chief Petty Officer	J.L.	Carter	
1976	Lieutenant Commander	R.L.	Clough	RNZN
1977	Stores Petty Officer	R.C.W.	Marshall	HMNZS Irirangi
1978	Lieutenant Commander	L.P.	Mason	RNZN
1979	Commander	L.P.	Mason (2)	RNZN
1980	Chief Weapons Electrical Artificer	G.F.	Smeaton	
1982	Chief Petty Officer Writer	R.C.	Nawisielski (3)	HMNZS Tamaki
1983	PORM	D.	Tonkin	HMNZS Irirangi
1984	WORM	R.	Hudson	HMNZS Irirangi
1985	Sub Lieutenant	P.	Gibson	RNZVR HMNZS Ngapona
1986	POREA	D.	Tonkin (2)	HMNZS Waikato
1987	Sub Lieutenant	P.	Gibson (2)	RNZVR HMNZS Ngapona
1988	WORM	R.	Hudson (2)	HMNZS Irirangi
1989	CPOREA	D.	Tonkin (3)	HMNZS Irirangi
