= Margaret Winser =

English sculptor and artist

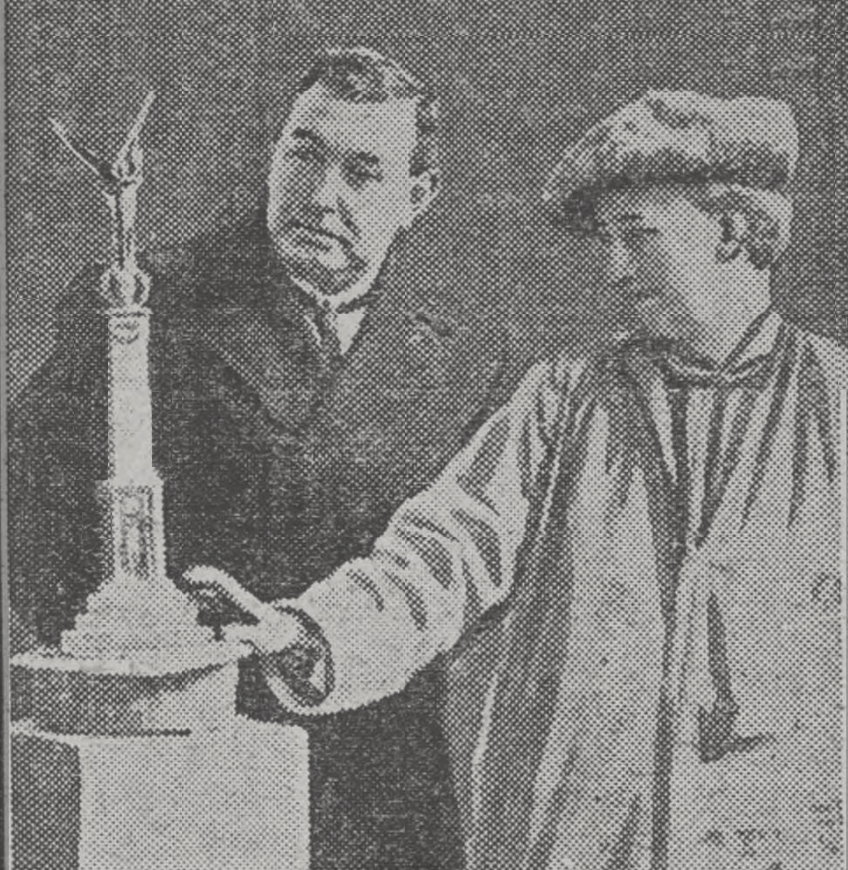
- Margaret Winser with Mayor of Hastings and model of Hastings War Memorial
- Born: 1868; Rolvenden, Kent
- Died: 29 December 1944 (aged 75–76)
- Known for: Sculpture
- Notable work: Hastings War Memorial

Margaret Winser (1868 – 29 December 1944) was an English sculptor, medallist, artist, and art teacher.

== Life and works ==
Margaret Winser was born at Rolvenden near Tenterdenin Kent during 1868, the daughter of Albert Winser, a farmer, and Mary Jane Winser. She began working as an assistant art teacher around 1891 and studied at the Dover School of Art, winning a number of National Competition awards. At some time she was a pupil of Auguste Rodin

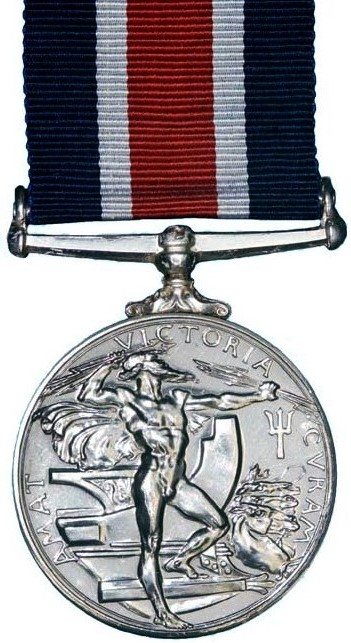
Naval Good Shooting Medal, reverse

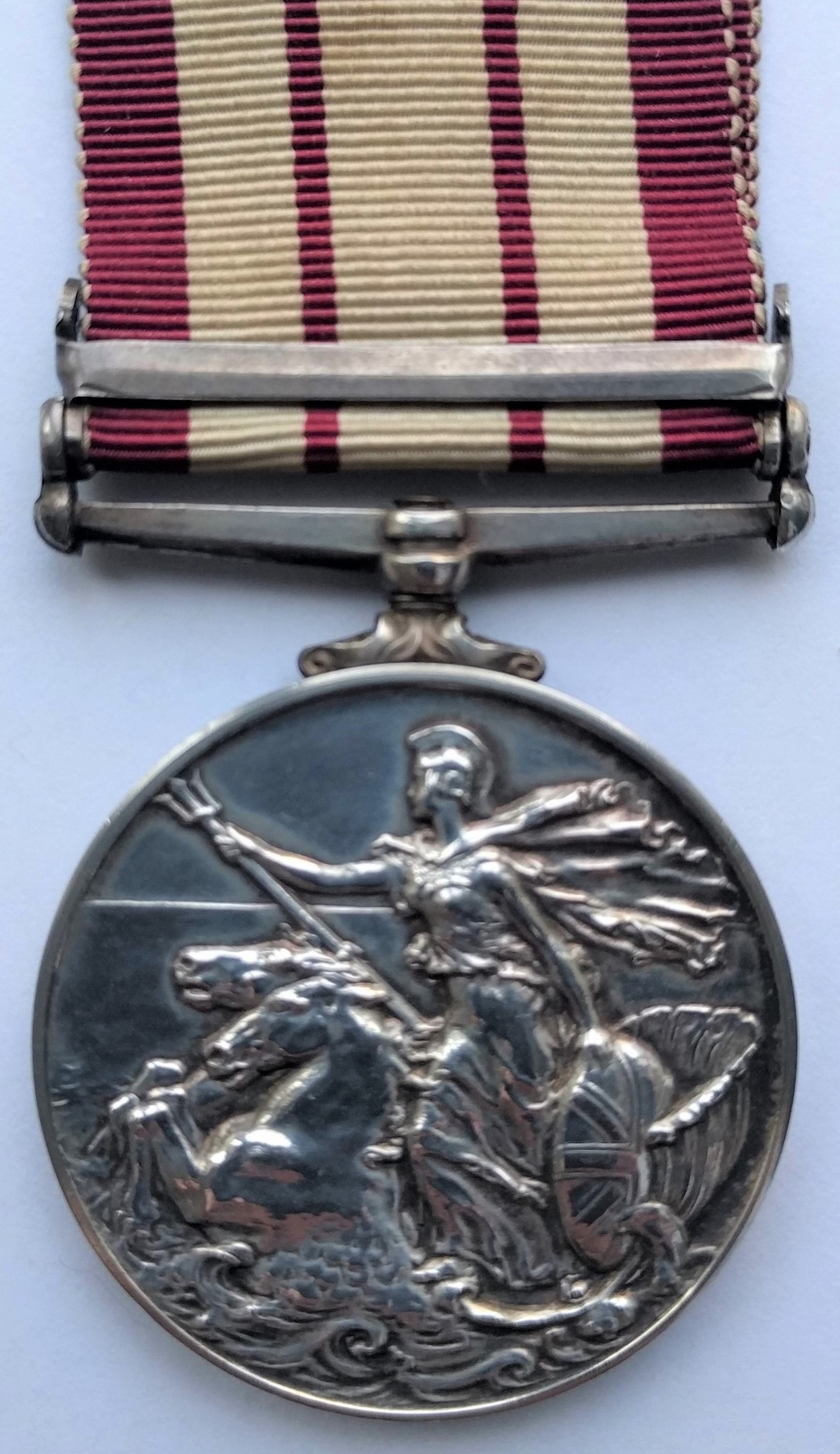
Naval General Service Medal (1915), reverse

=== Naval Good Shooting and General Service Medals ===
In February 1904, the Royal Mint invited students of the Modelling School of the Royal College of Art in South Kensington, London, to suggest designs for the reverse of the newly established Naval Good Shooting Medal. Winser's entry was selected and used, with the dies engraved by G. W. De Saulles. Although awards of the Naval Good Shooting Medal were discontinued in 1914, Winser's design is still used for the reverse of the Queen's Medal for Champion Shots for both the Royal Navy and the New Zealand Naval Forces.

Winser also designed the reverse of the Naval General Service Medal, instituted in August 1915 and awarded for minor Royal Navy campaigns until 1962.

=== Hastings War Memorial ===
After the First World War Winser was commissioned to design the Hastings and St Leonards War Memorial in Alexandra Park, Hastings. This included a bronze winged figure of victory and three bronze panels, depicting soldiers, sailors and airmen on active service. The memorial was dedicated on Sunday 26 March 1922.

Her design for the memorial to the 17 lifeboatman drowned in the 1928 Rye lifeboat disaster was approved by the men’s relatives, but was not finally used.

=== Ellen Terry and Smallhythe Place ===
Smallhythe Place, near Tenterden was bought by the actress Dame Ellen Terry in 1899, and was her main residence in her later years. Winser, who lived close by and who was a visitor to the house, produced a plaster medallion relief of Terry in 1913. Dame Ellen died at home on 21 July 1928 aged 81, in the presence of her daughter and son. The next day, Winser was invited to Smallhythe Place and made a mould of Ellen Terry's face, from which she produced four death masks. Of these, two remain at Smallhythe Place, one was given to Shakespeare Memorial Theatre in Stratford-upon-Avon in 1933 and the fourth was presented to the National Portrait Gallery, London in 1949. Two plaster casts of Terry's hands, were also made, probably by Winser, who also produced a bust of Ellen Terry based on these posthumous casts.

The plaster medallion, death mask and posthumous bust, along with a relief plaque of the Hastings War Memorial that she designed, remain in the collection at Smallhythe Place, which is now a museum run by the National Trust.

=== Other works ===
During her career, Winser created a large number of memorial plaques, statues and portrait medallions, including one of the violinist Joseph Joachim. From 1904 to 1929 she regularly exhibited at the Royal Academy in London, mainly as a sculptor of portrait and other medallions. She was one of the female sculptors that the Royal Society of British Sculptors considered including in the Franco-British Exhibition of Science, Art and Industries held in London in 1908. Other work included providing the illustrations for a book 'Lays and Legends of the Weald of Kent' written by her sister Lilian Winser, published in 1897.

She continued to live near Tenterden in Kent for most of her life, dying on 29 December 1944, aged 76.

== Examples of Winser's work ==
These are examples of her drawing and sculpture.

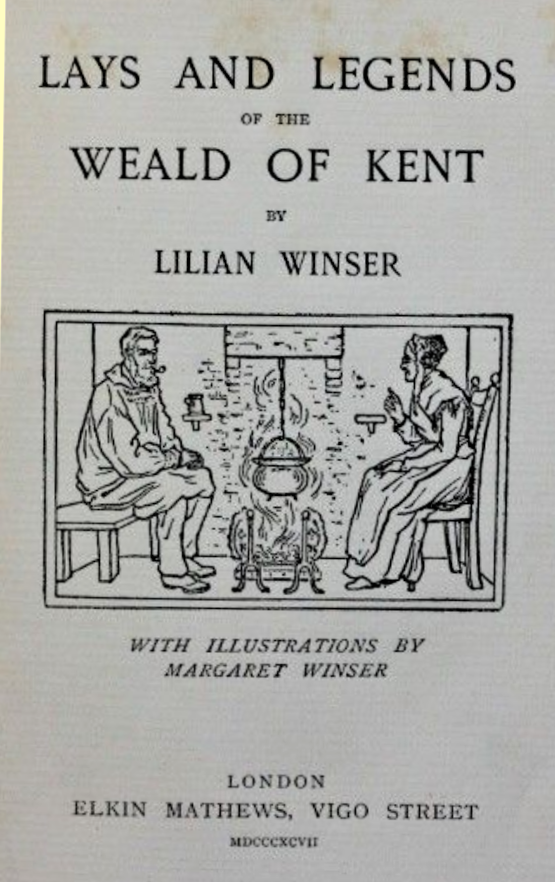
Frontispiece of book 'Lays and Legends of the Weald of Kent'

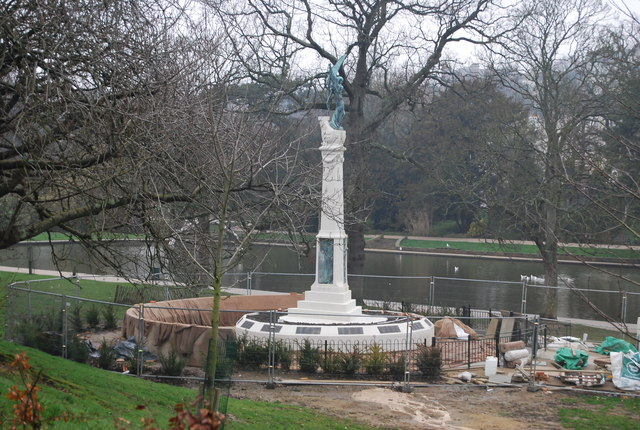
Hastings War Memorial

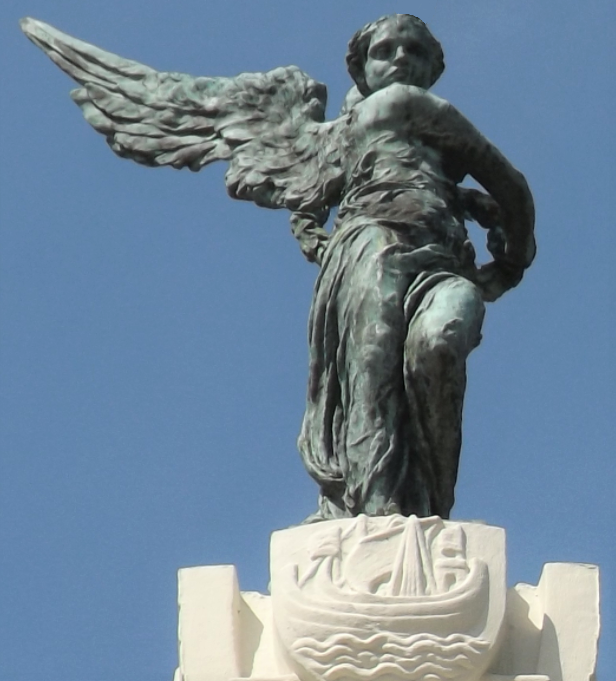
Hastings War Memorial: Figure of Victory

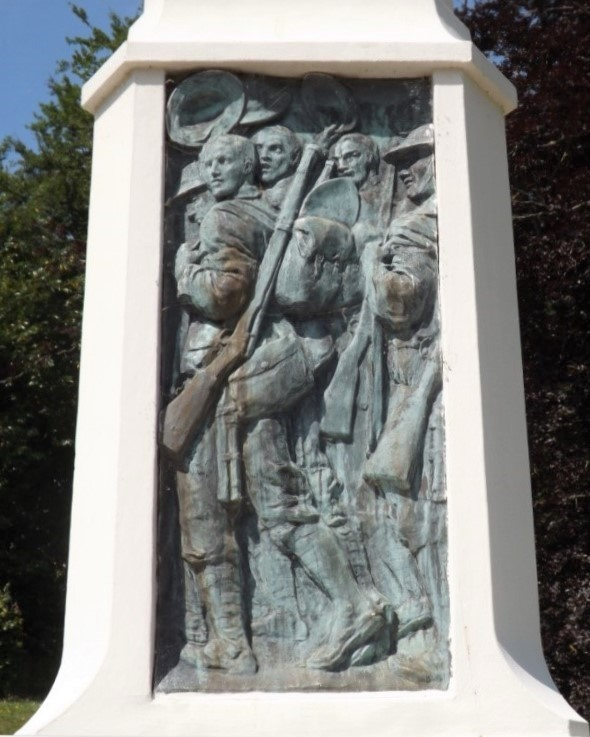
Hastings War Memorial: bronze plaque

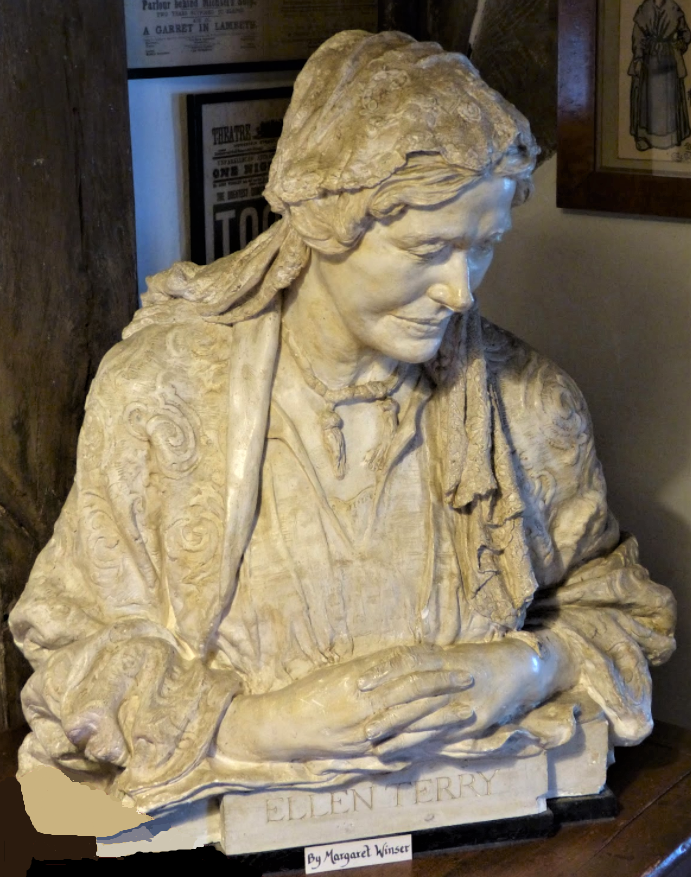
Bust of Ellen Terry, Smallhythe Place, Kent
