= King's Medal for Champion Shots in the Military Forces =

Queen's/King's Medal for Champion Shots in the Military Forces
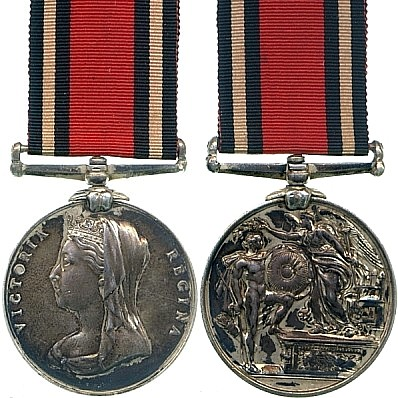
- Queen Victoria version
- Type: Military marksmanship medal
- Country: United Kingdom
- Presented by: the Monarch of the United Kingdom
- Eligibility: All ranks (Army)
- Clasps: Displaying year of award
- Status: Current in United Kingdom, Jamaica and New Zealand
- Established: 1869
- First award: 1870
- Ribbon bar

Order of wear
- Next (higher): King's Medal for Champion Shots of the New Zealand Naval Forces
- Next (lower): King's Medal for Champion Shots of the Air Forces

The Medal for the Best Shot in the British Army, Infantry, was instituted by Queen Victoria in 1869 and was awarded annually from 1870 to 1882 to the best shot of the Infantry of the British Army, including the Royal Engineers and the Colonial Corps.

In 1923, the medal was re-introduced by King George V and designated the King's Medal for Champion Shots in the Military Forces. It could now be awarded to the champions of Army marksmanship competitions, held under battle conditions at annual central meetings in the United Kingdom, the British Dominions, Colonies and India. Early participating countries were Australia, Canada, India, New Zealand, South Africa and Southern Rhodesia.

The number of countries which awarded the King's Medal for Champion Shots in the Military Forces grew to twelve by the mid-20th century, but as some countries gained independence from the United Kingdom or instituted their own equivalent awards, that number dwindled to the present three: the United Kingdom, Jamaica and New Zealand.

An Air Force version of the medal, the Queen's Medal for Champion Shots of the Air Forces, was instituted in 1953. This was followed by the institution of the Queen's Medal for Champion Shots of the New Zealand Naval Forces in 1958 and the Queen's Medal for Champion Shots of the Royal Navy and Royal Marines in 1966.

== Institution ==
Queen Victoria authorised the creation of the Medal for the Best Shot in the British Army, Infantry, by Royal Warrant dated 30 April 1869. The medal, initially struck in bronze and from 1872 in silver, was inscribed with the year in which won and the winner's name, number and regiment. It became the winner's property and could be worn by him during the whole of his service. From 1870, the medal was awarded annually, along with a £20 Prize for Skill at Arms, to the best shot of the Infantry of the British Army, including the Royal Engineers and the Colonial Corps. With only thirteen medals won, award of the medal and the £20 prize ceased after 1882. A £5 prize and a crowned badge of crossed carbines or rifles, worked in gold and worn upon the left arm, was approved to replace it on 10 June 1884.

After a 41-year lapse, the medal was re-introduced by King George V in 1923 and designated the King's Medal for Champion Shots in the Military Forces. The medal could now be awarded to the champions of Army marksmanship competitions, held under battle firing conditions at annual central meetings in the United Kingdom, India, the British Dominions and the Colony of Southern Rhodesia. Early participating countries were Australia, Canada, India, New Zealand, South Africa and Southern Rhodesia.

A date clasp was also introduced in 1923, for award with the medal to first recipients as well as, without a medal, to champions who had already been awarded the medal. The clasp is inscribed with the year of the award and is designed to be attached to the medal's suspension bar. The institution of the clasp was followed in 1926 with the provision that a rosette may be worn on the ribbon bar to indicate the award of each subsequent clasp.

== Award criteria ==
All medal contenders have to be serving members of the Regular Army, Army Emergency Reserve, Territorial Army, or Local Militia and Volunteer Forces in the countries concerned. Members of independent Naval and Air Forces, while not excluded from the competition, could therefore not be awarded the medal even though they won the championship. This regulation had consequences on two occasions.

- The 1938 competition in Canada was won by Leading Aircraftman T.W. Gregory, who had won the medal in 1935 as a Sergeant in the Canadian Regular Army. In 1938, since he was a member of the Royal Canadian Air Force by then, he was ineligible to be awarded the clasp and the medal was awarded to the runner-up. An Air Force version of the medal, the Queen's Medal for Champion Shots of the Air Forces, was instituted by Queen Elizabeth II in 1953. In 1955, Gregory won this new medal and became the only person to have won Queen's Medals in two different Arms of the Service.
- The 1962 competition in Rhodesia was won by Corporal Technician B.T. Gilpin, a member of the Royal Rhodesian Air Force. Despite protests from the Army commanders, the Minister of Defence presented Gilpin with the Army medal. As a result of the controversy, Rhodesia sought and was granted the Crown's permission to introduce the Queen's Medal for Champion Shots of the Air Forces. The first Rhodesian Air Force award was backdated to 1962 and the first two medals were presented in December 1963, one to Gilpin and the other to the Air Force champion for 1963. Gilpin's 1962 Army medal was returned and the 1962 Army runner-up, Inspector D. Hollingworth, was awarded a second clasp to his existing medal.

The institution of the Queen's Medal for Champion Shots of the Air Forces was followed by the institution of the Queen's Medal for Champion Shots of the New Zealand Naval Forces in 1958 and the Queen's Medal for Champion Shots of the Royal Navy and Royal Marines in 1966.

== Order of wear ==
In the order of wear prescribed by the British Central Chancery of the Orders of Knighthood, the Queen's/King's Medal for Champion Shots in the Military Forces takes precedence after the King's Medal for Champion Shots of the New Zealand Naval Forces and before the King's Medal for Champion Shots of the Air Forces.

== Participating countries ==
In the United Kingdom, the medal is at present awarded annually to the winner of the Regular Army championship - the Army Operational Shooting Competition.

From 1935, a second medal could be awarded annually in the United Kingdom, to the champion shot of the Territorial Army. In order to also be eligible for the medal, members of the Supplementary Reserve were included in the competition's definition of the Territorial Army from 1936. The competition to determine the annual medal winner for the part-time forces is held during the National Rifle Association's annual Imperial Meeting at the National Shooting Centre, Bisley.

Outside the United Kingdom, the number of British Commonwealth countries which awarded the medal grew to eleven by the mid-20th century. This number decreased over the ensuing years, however, since some countries became republics and stopped awarding the medal, while others replaced the medal with new domestic versions. The tables below list the recipients of the medal in the respective countries.

=== Australia ===
The first King's Medal Competition in the Commonwealth of Australia was held in 1924 and the first medal to an Australian was won by Temporary Quartermaster and Honorary Captain W.C.G. Ruddock of the Australian Instructional Corps. In 1988, the Champion Shots Medal was instituted in Australia and the Queen's Medal for Champion Shots in the Military Forces ceased to be awarded.

Recipients
| Year | Rank | Initials | Surname | Unit or Formation |
|---|---|---|---|---|
| 1924 | T/QM (Hon Capt) | W.C.G. | Ruddock | Australian Instructional Corps |
| 1925 | WO2 | A. | Taylor | Australian Instructional Corps |
| 1926 | WO1 (Hon Lt) | E.F. | Davies | Australian Instructional Corps, 3 MD |
| 1927 | WO1 | J.D. | Shearim | Australian Instructional Corps, Small Arms School |
| 1928 | WO1 (Hon Lt) | J. | Hutchison | Australian Instructional Corps, 2 MD |
| 1929 | WO1 | J.D. | Shearim (2) | Australian Instructional Corps, Small Arms School |
| 1930 | WO1 | W.H. | Hackfath DCM | Australian Instructional Corps, 5 MD |
| 1931 | WO1 | J.D. | Shearim (3) | Australian Instructional Corps, Small Arms School |
| 1932 | Lt | C.W. | Potter | 3rd Light Horse Regiment 4 MD |
| 1933 | WO1 | J.D. | Shearim (4) | Australian Instructional Corps, Small Arms School |
| 1934 | Bdr | J.C. | King | 2 SRG 3 MD, 2nd Survey Co AGA |
| 1935 | Cpl | A.F. | Carson | 32nd Infantry Battalion, 3MD |
| 1936 | Pte | E.W. | Potter | 43/48 Infantry Battalion, 4 MD |
| 1937 | Pte | E.W. | Potter (2) | 43/48 Infantry Battalion, 4 MD |
| 1938 | Pte | N.W. | Savage | Sydney University Regiment 2 MD |
| 1939 | Sgt | N.P.W. | Hall | 37/39 Infantry Battalion 3 MD |
| 1947 | Lt | A. | Preston | EDN 1 MD, Northern Command AMF |
| 1948 | Capt | E.A. | Green | AEME 2 MD |
| 1949 | Capt | L.A.J. | Eagleson | RAAC Eastern Command, 1RNSWL |
| 1950 | WO2 | R.D. | Archer | 5 Inf Bn Southern Command |
| 1951 | Maj | G.C. | Magenis | RAAC AHQ |
| 1952 | Maj | G.C. | Magenis (2) | Army Branch Department of Supply, RAAC |
| 1953 | Sgt | G.L. | Loveband | 16 NS TRG Bn Central Command, RAINF |
| 1954 | Sgt | P.F. | Jeffery | INT Corps HQ Western Command ARA |
| 1955 | Sgt | R.K. | Beardman | 16 Petroleum Platoon RAASC (CMF) Western Command |
| 1956 | Maj | E.A. | Green (2) | HQ Eastern Command, RAEME |
| 1957 | WO2 | R.D. | Archer (2) | RAINF Southern Comd Trg School |
| 1958 | WO1 | J.A. | Guymer | CRE Central Command, RAINF |
| 1959 | WO1 | R.D. | Archer (3) | RAINF HQ Southern Command |
| 1960 | L Cpl | G.A. | Dennis | RAE Central Command |
| 1961 | WO2 | P.J. | Pini | Army Headquarters. |
| 1962 | WO2 | G.L. | Loveband (2) | 4 Cadet Battalion. RAINF Central Command. |
| 1963 | Capt | G.S. | Pratt | HQ FARELF, 2RAR |
| 1964 | Pte | E.R. | French | JTC, RAINF |
| 1965 | Capt | M.D. | Hauber | HQ Northern Command, RAINF |
| 1966 | WO2 | L.F. | Steele | Northern Command Workshops |
| 1967 | Capt | M.D. | Hauber (2) | 3 Cadet Bn, Northern Command |
| 1968 | WO2 | L.F. | Steele (2) | Northern Command Workshops |
| 1969 | Maj | K.J. | Bladen | HQ Western Command |
| 1970 | WO2 | L.F. | Steele (3) | Northern Command Workshops |
| 1971 | Sgt | J.W. | Guest | RAINF 2 MD |
| 1972 | Sgt | P.K. | Oakford | RAINF 3 MD |
| 1973 | Sgt | P.T.G. | Clarke | 4th Field Force Group Intelligence Unit |
| 1974 | Sgt | P.K. | Oakford (2) | Melbourne University Regiment |
| 1975 | Sgt | J.W. | Guest (2) | 1 Recruit Training Battalion |
| 1976 | Sgt | P.K. | Oakford (3) | Melbourne University Regiment |
| 1977 | S Sgt | P.T.G. | Clarke (2) | 4th Field Force Group Intelligence Unit |
| 1978 | Capt | R.G. | Skelton | HQ 2nd Military District. DPR, DOD. |
| 1979 | Capt | G.L. | Mincham | RAEME 3rd Military District, HQ Logistic Command |
| 1980 | Sgt | J.W. | Dixon | 8/9th Battalion, Royal Australian Regiment |
| 1981 | S Sgt | P.K. | Oakford (4) | 2/4th Battalion, Royal Australian Regiment |
| 1982 | Sgt | G.J. | Sawle | Infantry Centre, Singleton |
| 1983 | Sgt | J.W. | Dixon (2) | Land Warfare Centre, Canungra |
| 1984 | WO2 | P.K. | Oakford (5) | 2nd Cadet Group |
| 1985 | WO1 | A.H. | Bowden | HQ Training Command |
| 1986 | WO2 | P.K. | Oakford (6) | 11 Field Force Group |
| 1987 | Sgt | L.W. | Nayda | Army Apprentices School |

=== Canada ===
The first King's Medal Competition in Canada was held for the Canadian Regular Force in 1923 and the first medal to a Canadian was won by Warrant Officer Class 1 F.J. Goodhouse of the Royal Canadian Army Service Corps. From 1963, two Queen's Medals for Champion Shots in the Military Forces were awarded annually in Canada, the second to a member of either the Royal Canadian Mounted Police or the Canadian Reserve Force. The first of these was won by Lance Sergeant T.A.P. Richardson of the Victoria Rifles of Canada. On 28 August 1991 the Queen's Medal for Champion Shot (French: Médaille de la Reine pour tireur d'élite), a distinct Canadian version of the medal, was instituted and from 1992 the British version of the Queen's Medal for Champion Shots in the Military Forces ceased to be awarded.

Recipients
| Year | Rank | Initials | Surname | Regular Forces Unit or Formation |
|---|---|---|---|---|
| 1923 | WO1 | F.J. | Goodhouse | CASC |
| 1924 | Cpl | W.J. | Livingstone | The Governor General's Foot Guards |
| 1925 | Lt | D.T. | Burke | The Governor General's Foot Guards |
| 1926 | Cpl | W.J. | Livingstone (2) | The Governor General's Foot Guards |
| 1927 | Lt | D.T. | Burke (2) | The Governor General's Foot Guards |
| 1928 | Maj | J. | Jeffrey OBE MC | RCR |
| 1929 | Lt | D.T. | Burke (3) | The Governor General's Foot Guards |
| 1930 | Lt | D.T. | Burke (4) | The Governor General's Foot Guards |
| 1931 | Lt | D.T. | Burke (5) | The Governor General's Foot Guards |
| 1932 | Capt | J.W. | Houlden | The Sherbrooke Regiment |
| 1933 | Lt | A.B. | Coulter OBE ED | The Governor General's Foot Guards |
| 1934 | Capt | J.W. | Houlden (2) | The Sherbrooke Regiment |
| 1935 | Sgt | T.W. | Gregory | 7th BN CMG Corps |
| 1936 | L Cpl | C. | Robins | PPCLI |
| 1937 | Lt | G.A. | Molecey | Canadian Irish Fusiliers |
| 1938 | Pte | F. | Wallace | 48th Highlanders of Canada |
| 1939 | Capt | D.T. | Burke (6) | The Governor General's Foot Guards |
| 1947 | Maj | D.T. | Burke (7) | RCAMC |
| 1948 | Lt | R.F.P. | Fendick | RCEME, RCOC |
| 1949 | CO | G.S. | Boa | Central Command Contingent (48 Highlanders of Canada) |
| 1950 | Lt | G.S. | Boa (2) | 48 Highlanders of Canada |
| 1951 | Lt | G.S. | Boa (3) | 48 Highlanders of Canada |
| 1952 | Lt | S.F. | Johnson OBE ED | 14th Armoured Regiment (King's Own Calgary Regiment) |
| 1953 | Lt | A.H. | McKeage | Canadian Grenadier Guards |
| 1954 | Capt | D.C. | Lawford | 1st Canadian Signals Regiment |
| 1955 | 2 Lt | E.L. | Warner | The Sherbrooke Regiment (12th Armoured Regiment) |
| 1956 | Sgt | J.R. | Hardy | RCEME |
| 1957 | Lt | A. S. | Derrick | RCSME, RCE |
| 1958 | S Sgt | L.A. | White MMM CD | RCS of I, Princess Patricia's Canadian Light Infantry |
| 1959 | Capt | J.J. | Barrett CD | AHQ, RCR |
| 1960 | WO2 | C.F. | Rowell CD | RCS of I, Regiment of Canadian Guards |
| 1961 | Pte | J.W. | Matthews | PPCLI |
| 1962 | Lt | D.K. | Lidgren | RCS of I, PPCLI |
| 1963 | Sgt | J.E. | Daigle MMM | Royal 22e Régiment |
| 1964 | Lt | W.J. | Molnar | The Black Watch (Royal Highland Regiment) |
| 1965 | Sgt | R.E. | Bennett | RCE |
| 1966 | Sgt | J.E. | Daigle MMM (2) | 3 Bn, Royal 22e Régiment |
| 1967 | Cpl | K.A. | Fleming | RCOC |
| 1968 | Cpl | L. | Mercier | 3 Bn, Royal 22e Régiment |
| 1969 | MWO | L.A. | White MMM CD (2) | Canadian Airborne Regiment |
| 1970 | Sgt | J.E. | Daigle MMM CD (3) | 3 Bn, Royal 22e Régiment |
| 1971 | M Cpl | J.R. | Hennick CD | 1 Bn, Royal Canadian Regiment |
| 1972 | WO | L.G. | Glibbery | 3 Bn, Royal Canadian Regiment |
| 1973 | Sgt | R. | L'Heureux | 3 Bn, Royal 22e Régiment |
| 1974 | Sgt | L. | Mercier (2) | 3 Bn, Royal 22e Régiment |
| 1975 | Sgt | L. | Mercier (3) | 3 Bn, Royal 22e Régiment |
| 1977 | Sgt | E.J. | Luscombe | 3 Bn PPCLI |
| 1978 | Cpl | H. | McKay | 2 Bn, Royal Canadian Regiment |
| 1979 | M Cpl | A.M | Cromwell | Canadian Airborne Regiment |
| 1980 | Sgt | H.B. | McLellan | Canadian Airborne Regiment |
| 1981 | WO | J.R.A. | Surette | 2 Bn The Royal Canadian Regiment |
| 1982 | M Cpl | D.L.V. | Demeuse | 3 Bn, Royal 22e Régiment |
| 1983 | WO | J.R.A. | Surette (2) | 2 Bn The Royal Canadian Regiment |
| 1984 | WO | J.R.A. | Surette (3) | 2 Bn The Royal Canadian Regiment |
| 1985 | WO | J.R.A. | Surette (4) | 2 Bn The Royal Canadian Regiment |
| 1986 | WO | J.R. | Levesque MMM CD | 3 Bn, Royal 22e Régiment |
| 1987 | WO | J.R. | Levesque MMM CD (2) | 3 Bn, Royal 22e Régiment |
| 1988 | Capt | S. | Tibbetts | 2 Bn, Royal Canadian Regiment |
| 1989 | Sgt | S.G. | Hitchcock CD | 3rd Bn PPCLI |
| 1990 | M Cpl | W.T. | Smith | 2 Bn, Royal Canadian Regiment |
| 1991 | M Cpl | F.J. | Snow | 2 Bn, Royal Canadian Regiment |

Recipients
| Year | Rank | Initials | Surname | RCMP or Reserves Unit or Formation |
|---|---|---|---|---|
| 1963 | L Sgt | T.A.P. | Richardson | Victoria Rifles of Canada |
| 1964 | S Sgt | C. | Tremblay CD | Les Voltigeurs de Quebec |
| 1965 | Sgt | G.C. | Campbell | Royal Westminster Regiment |
| 1966 | Pte | R.D. | Clerk | Royal Montreal Regiment |
| 1967 | S Sgt | L. | Fish | Canadian Lorne Scots Regiment |
| 1968 | Maj | E.L. | Warner CD (2) | The Sherbrooke Hussars |
| 1969 | Maj | E.L. | Warner CD (3) | The Sherbrooke Hussars |
| 1970 | Sgt | G.W. | Black | Royal Canadian Mounted Police "A" Division |
| 1971 | Maj | E.L. | Warner CD (4) | The Sherbrooke Hussars |
| 1972 | Maj | E.L. | Warner CD (5) | The Sherbrooke Hussars |
| 1973 | Lt | W. | Kedziora CD | Royal Hamilton Light Infantry |
| 1974 | S Sgt | G.W. | Black (2) | Royal Canadian Mounted Police "A" Division |
| 1975 | WO | G.N. | Senetchko | Queen's Own Rifles of Canada |
| 1976 | Lt | R. | Savinski | Le Regiment du Saguenay |
| 1977 | Capt | K.K. | Nicholson | The Elgin Regiment |
| 1978 | Cpl | D.D. | Oakie | Royal Montreal Regiment |
| 1979 | Cpl | D.D. | Oakie (2) | The Loyal Edmonton Regiment |
| 1980 | Lt | K.E. | Ferguson | 1st Battalion Nova Scotia Highlanders (North) |
| 1981 | Lt | K.E. | Ferguson (2) | 1st Battalion Nova Scotia Highlanders (North) |
| 1982 | Lt | M.R. | Williams | Queen's Own Rifles of Canada |
| 1983 | Lt | M.R. | Williams (2) | Queen's Own Rifles of Canada |
| 1984 | Lt | K.E. | Ferguson (3) | 1st Battalion Nova Scotia Highlanders (North) |
| 1985 | Lt | K.E. | Ferguson (4) | 1st Battalion Nova Scotia Highlanders (North) |
| 1986 | Sgt | G.J. | West | Royal Hamilton Light Infantry |
| 1987 | Sgt | G.J. | West (2) | Royal Hamilton Light Infantry |
| 1988 | Pte | Shannon M. | Wills | 12 (Vancouver) Service Battalion |
| 1989 | WO | J.R.A. | Surette (5) | Royal New Brunswick Regiment |
| 1990 | Lt | K.E. | Ferguson (5) | 1st Battalion Nova Scotia Highlanders (North) |
| 1991 | Cpl | M.E. | Paquette | Les Fusiliers Mont-Royal |

=== Ceylon ===
The first Queen's Medal Competition in Ceylon was held in 1954 and the first medal to a Ceylonese was won by Captain C.L.A.P. Direkze of the Ceylon Light Infantry Regiment. The medal was awarded in Ceylon only three more times, in 1957, 1958 and 1966.

| Year | Rank | Initials | Surname | Unit or Formation |
|---|---|---|---|---|
| 1954 | Capt | C.L.A.P. | Direkze | The Ceylon Light Infantry Regiment |
| 1957 | L Cpl | K.R. | Perera | 1st Bn The Ceylon Light Infantry Regiment |
| 1958 | L Cpl | K.R. | Perera | 1st Bn The Ceylon Light Infantry Regiment |
| 1966 | Sgt | S.W. | Silva | The Ceylon Light Infantry Regiment |

=== Ghana ===
The Queen's Medal Competition was held in Ghana only once, in 1959, and was won by Sergeant M.P. Konkomba of the 2nd Battalion Ghana Regiment of Infantry. The competition and award was abolished by Ghana in 1963.

=== India ===
The first King's Medal Competition in India was held in 1924 and the first medal to an Indian was won by Naik S.S. Lama of the 2nd King Edward VII's Own Gurkha Rifles (The Sirmoor Rifles). British soldiers were also entitled to compete for the medal while stationed in India, and won it on several occasions. The last competition was held in 1938, before it was interrupted by the outbreak of the Second World War in 1939. In 1947, India was granted independence and the medal ceased to be awarded.

| Year | Rank | Initials | Surname | Unit or Formation |
|---|---|---|---|---|
| 1924 | Naik | S.S. | Lama | 2nd King Edward's Own Gurkha Rifles |
| 1925 | Jemadar | K. | Raza | 4th Hazara Pioneers |
| 1926 | Sgt | B. | Cartwright | 1st Battalion South Staffordshire Regiment |
| 1927 | Rfn | H. | Lewis | 1st Battalion King's Royal Rifle Corps |
| 1928 | Naik | B.S. | Thapa | 2nd King Edward's Own Gurkha Rifles |
| 1929 | Naik | B.S. | Thapa (2) | 2nd King Edward's Own Gurkha Rifles |
| 1930 | Jemadar | Y. | Ali | Hazara Pioneers |
| 1931 | Havildar | B.S. | Thapa (3) | 2nd King Edward's Own Gurkha Rifles |
| 1932 | Sgt | C.S. | Cole | The Simla Rifles |
| 1933 | Sgt | W.H. | Bayes | 13th/18th Hussars |
| 1934 | L Cpl | | Thurbon | 1st Battalion Norfolk Regiment |
| 1935 | Bhm | N. | Thapa | 1st/5th Royal Gurkha Rifles |
| 1936 | Capt | E.E.E. | Cass DSO MC | King's Own Yorkshire Light Infantry |
| 1937 | Havildar | H. | Gurung | 1st/5th Royal Gurkha Rifles |
| 1938 | Maj | W.P. | Khan | 1st/15th Punjab Regiment |

=== Jamaica ===
Before 1963, the Jamaican competition was an annual local shooting competition which did not form part of the Queen's Medal Competitions. The first Queen's Medal Competition in Jamaica was held in 1963 and the first medal to a Jamaican was won by Private J.E.P. Daley of the 1st Battalion, The Jamaica Regiment. The medal can still be awarded annually in Jamaica.

| Year | Rank | Initials | Surname | Unit or Formation |
|---|---|---|---|---|
| 1963 | Pte | J.E.P. | Daley | 1st Battalion The Jamaica Regiment |
| 1964 | Sgt | D.dQ. | Small | 1st Battalion The Jamaica Regiment |
| 1965 | L Cpl | C. | Barker | 1st Battalion The Jamaica Regiment |
| 1966 | Sgt | A. | Thompson | 1st Battalion The Jamaica Regiment |
| 1967 | L Cpl | C. | Burke | 1st Battalion The Jamaica Regiment |
| 1970 | Pte | B. | Black | 1st Battalion The Jamaica Regiment |
| 1971 | Cpl | T.N. | Martin | 1st Battalion The Jamaica Regiment |
| 1972 | Sgt | T.N. | Martin (2) | 1st Battalion The Jamaica Regiment |
| 1973 | C Sgt | T.N. | Martin (3) | 1st Battalion The Jamaica Regiment |
| 1974 | Sgt | R. | McPherson | 1st Battalion The Jamaica Regiment |
| 1975 | Lt | D. | Clarke | Supply & Services Battalion |
| 1977 | Maj | I.C. | Robinson | 1st Battalion The Jamaica Regiment |
| 1978 | Cpl | N. | Rose | 3rd Battalion The Jamaica Regiment National Reserve |
| 1979 | WO2 | T.N. | Martin (4) | 1st Battalion The Jamaica Regiment |
| 1980 | Cpl | N. | Rose (2) | 3rd Battalion The Jamaica Regiment National Reserve |
| 1981 | C Sgt | J. | Drummond | Support Company Group |
| 1982 | Sgt | A. | Kidd | 3rd Battalion The Jamaica Regiment National Reserve |
| 1983 | Pte | D. | Forrester | 1st Battalion The Jamaica Regiment |
| 1984 | WO1 | T.N. | Martin (5) | 2nd Battalion The Jamaica Regiment |
| 1985 | WO1 | T.N. | Martin (6) | 2nd Battalion The Jamaica Regiment |
| 1986 | WO1 | T.N. | Martin (7) | 2nd Battalion The Jamaica Regiment |
| 1987 | Pte | L. | Richards | 3rd Battalion The Jamaica Regiment National Reserve |
| 1988 | Cpl | E.B. | Grant | 2nd Battalion The Jamaica Regiment |
| 1989 | Capt | H.A. | Blake | 2nd Battalion The Jamaica Regiment |
| 1990 | Cpl | E. | Gordon | 2nd Battalion The Jamaica Regiment |
| 1993 | PO | L. | Heron | Jamaican Defence Force Coast Guard |
| 1994 | Cpl | N.S. | Mullings | 1st Battalion The Jamaica Regiment |
| 1995 | Sgt | F. | Dixon | 3rd Battalion The Jamaica Regiment National Reserve |
| 1998 | L Cpl | C. | Chung | 2nd Battalion The Jamaica Regiment |
| 2004 | Cpl | B. | Mignott | |
| 2005 | L Cpl | L. | Clarke | |
| 2006 | Pte | L. | Peynado | |
| 2007 | Pte | G. | Bryan | Jamaica Defence Force Air Wing |
| 2011 | L Cpl | | Robinson | Support and Services Battalion |
| 2012 | Pte | M. | Montaque | 2nd Battalion The Jamaica Regiment |
| 2015 | L Cpl | G. | Bryan (2) | Jamaica Defence Force Air Wing |

=== New Zealand ===
The first King's Medal Competition in New Zealand was held in 1923 and the first medal to a New Zealander was won by Staff Sergeant-Major A.J. Moore of the New Zealand Permanent Staff. Although the competition was interrupted on a few occasions, the longest period being from 1931 to 1954 due to the discontinuance of the Combined Services Small Arms Association Annual Meetings and the Second World War, the medal is still being awarded annually in New Zealand.

| Year | Rank | Initials | Surname | Unit or Formation |
|---|---|---|---|---|
| 1923 | S Sgt | A.J. | Moore | New Zealand Permanent Staff |
| 1924 | S Sgt | H.L.S. | Frank | New Zealand Permanent Staff |
| 1926 | S Sgt | J.S. | Thomson | New Zealand Permanent Staff |
| 1927 | Lt | T.J. | Denton | New Zealand Permanent Air Force |
| 1928 | L Cpl | S.L.W. | Bernet | 1st Battalion, The Wellington Regiment (C.W.O) |
| 1929 | S Sgt | J.H.P. | Kearney | New Zealand Permanent Staff |
| 1930 | S Sgt | J.S. | Thomson (2) | New Zealand Permanent Staff |
| 1955 | Pte | I.R. | Larsen | Royal New Zealand Army Ordnance Corps |
| 1956 | L Cpl | I.R. | Larsen (2) | Royal New Zealand Army Ordnance Corps |
| 1957 | S Sgt | I.G. | Campbell | Royal New Zealand Army Ordnance Corps |
| 1958 | Lt | J.S. | Wooster | New Zealand Electrical and Mechanical Engineers |
| 1959 | Cpl | I.R. | Larsen (3) | Royal New Zealand Army Ordnance Corps |
| 1960 | Lt | J.S. | Wooster (2) | New Zealand Electrical and Mechanical Engineers |
| 1961 | Lt | J.S. | Wooster (3) | New Zealand Electrical and Mechanical Engineers |
| 1962 | Lt | J.S. | Wooster (4) | New Zealand Electrical and Mechanical Engineers |
| 1963 | S Sgt | G. | Collins | New Zealand Electrical and Mechanical Engineers |
| 1964 | WO2 | G. | Collins (2) | Royal New Zealand Electrical and Mechanical Engineers |
| 1965 | WO2 | G. | Collins (3) | Royal New Zealand Electrical and Mechanical Engineers |
| 1969 | Pte | R. | Dunlea | Royal New Zealand Infantry Regiment |
| 1970 | L Cpl | A.G. | Owens | 1st Infantry Workshops |
| 1971 | L Cpl | A.G. | Owens (2) | 1st Infantry Workshops |
| 1972 | Cpl | A.G. | Owens (3) | 1st Infantry Workshops |
| 1973 | S Sgt | V.E. | Mottram | Royal New Zealand Army Service Corps |
| 1974 | Sgt | R.D. | Johns | 2/1 Royal New Zealand Infantry Regiment |
| 1975 | Sgt | I.L. | Smeath | 2/1 Royal New Zealand Infantry Regiment |
| 1976 | Sgt | L.M.H. | Pederson | Royal New Zealand Infantry Regiment |
| 1977 | Sgt | L.M.H. | Pederson (2) | Royal New Zealand Infantry Regiment |
| 1978 | S Sgt | F.V. | Thompson | Royal New Zealand Electrical and Mechanical Engineers (TF) |
| 1979 | Sgt | I.L. | Smeath (2) | T.M.S. A.T.G (RNZIR) |
| 1980 | WO2 | G.W. | Benfell | Royal New Zealand Infantry Regiment |
| 1981 | L Cpl | T.J. | Quirke | Royal New Zealand Electrical & Mechanical Engineers, 4 ATG Wksp |
| 1982 | S Sgt | C.J. | Parkinson | Royal New Zealand Electrical and Mechanical Engineers |
| 1983 | L Cpl | P. | Harris | NZSAS |
| 1984 | Capt | R.S. | Macmillan | Royal New Zealand Corps of Transport |
| 1985 | S Sgt | M.A.H. | Gillice | Royal New Zealand Electrical and Mechanical Engineers |
| 1986 | L Cpl | I.D. | Lawrence | Royal New Zealand Infantry Regiment |
| 1987 | S Sgt | M.A.H. | Gillice (2) | Royal New Zealand Electrical and Mechanical Engineers |
| 1988 | S Sgt | M.A.H. | Gillice (3) | Royal New Zealand Electrical and Mechanical Engineers |
| 1989 | S Sgt | M.A.H. | Gillice (4) | Royal New Zealand Electrical and Mechanical Engineers |
| 1990 | S Sgt | M.A.H. | Gillice (5) | Royal New Zealand Electrical and Mechanical Engineers |
| 1991 | S Sgt | T.W. | Small | Royal New Zealand Infantry Regiment |
| 1992 | Pte | R.D. | Bird | Royal New Zealand Infantry Regiment |
| 1993 | Sgt | C.J. | Venning | Royal New Zealand Infantry Regiment |
| 1994 | Sgt | N.M. | Greer | Royal New Zealand Infantry Regiment |
| 1995 | Sgt | G. | Beer | Royal New Zealand Electrical and Mechanical Engineers |
| 1996 | Pte | C.P. | Hally | Royal New Zealand Infantry Regiment |
| 1997 | L Cpl | R.D. | Bird (2) | Royal New Zealand Infantry Regiment |
| 1998 | WO2 | P.R.S. | Chalmers | RNZALR |
| 1999 | WO2 | P.R.S. | Chalmers (2) | RNZALR |
| 2000 | Lt | G.D. | Beer | RNZALR |
| 2003 | Pte | T.H.M. | Bush | Royal New Zealand Infantry Regiment |
| 2004 | Sgt | C.P. | Hally (2) | 1 Bn., Royal New Zealand Infantry Regiment |
| 2005 | Lt | N. | Fisher | 3rd Logistics Battalion |
| 2006 | S Sgt | D. | Sarney | 7 Wellington Hawkes Bay Battalion, RNZ Infantry Regiment |
| 2007 | L Cpl | A. | Miller | 1 Bn., Royal New Zealand Infantry Regiment |
| 2008 | S Sgt | C.P. | Hally (3) | 1 Bn., Royal New Zealand Infantry Regiment |
| 2009 | Capt | S. | Davis | 7 Wellington Hawkes Bay Battalion, RNZ Infantry Regiment |
| 2010 | Cpl | T. | Bryce | 1 Bn., Royal New Zealand Infantry Regiment |
| 2014 | Capt | B. | Jones | 2/1 Bn., Royal New Zealand Infantry Regiment |
| 2015 | Pte | S. | Olliver | 5/7 Bn., Royal New Zealand Infantry Regiment |
| 2016 | Pte | S. | Olliver (2) | 5/7 Bn., Royal New Zealand Infantry Regiment |
| 2017 | Cpl | J.P. | McCann | 5/7 Bn., Royal New Zealand Infantry Regiment |
| 2018 | L Cpl | M. | Lupi | 5/7 Bn., Royal New Zealand Infantry Regiment |
| 2019 | Pte | D. | Cramp | 1 Bn., Royal New Zealand Infantry Regiment |

=== Pakistan ===
The first Queen's Medal Competition in Pakistan was held in 1950 and the first medal to a Pakistani was won by Jemadar S.P. Akbar of the South Waziristan Scouts. The competition was not held again after 1956.

| Year | Rank | Initials | Surname | Unit or Formation |
|---|---|---|---|---|
| 1950 | Jemadar | S.P. | Akbar | South Waziristan Scouts |
| 1951 | Maj | M.M. | Amin | 14th Punjab Regiment |
| 1952 | Naik | A. | Khan | 14th Punjab Regiment |
| 1953 | Havildar | A. | Khan | 14th Punjab Regiment |
| 1955 | Havildar | | Zabardast | South Waziristan Scouts |
| 1956 | Jemadar | B. | Khan | South Waziristan Scouts |

=== Rhodesia ===
The first King's Medal Competition in Southern Rhodesia was held in 1926 and the first medal to a Rhodesian was won by Sergeant F.G. Elliott of the British South Africa Police. From 1940 to 1947 the competition was interrupted by the Second World War. After Rhodesia's Unilateral Declaration of Independence on 11 November 1965, the competition and the award of the Queen's Medal for Champion Shots in the Military Forces continued for another four years, until Rhodesia severed its ties with the British Crown on 2 March 1970 and, in that same year, instituted the President’s_Medal_for_Shooting_(Rhodesia) of the Security Forces.

| Year | Rank | Initials | Surname | Unit or Formation |
|---|---|---|---|---|
| 1926 | Sgt | F.G. | Elliott | British South Africa Police |
| 1927 | CQMS | F.H. | Morgan MBE | Territorial Force |
| 1928 | CQMS | F.H. | Morgan MBE (2) | Territorial Force |
| 1929 | CQMS | F.H. | Morgan MBE (3) | Territorial Force |
| 1930 | Sgt | N.A. | Fereday | Territorial Force |
| 1931 | Sgt | N.A. | Fereday (2) | Territorial Force |
| 1932 | Lt | F.H. | Morgan MBE (4) | Territorial Force |
| 1933 | CQMS | N.A. | Fereday (3) | 1st Bn Salisbury Regiment |
| 1934 | CQMS | N.A. | Fereday (4) | 1st Bn Salisbury Regiment |
| 1935 | Rfn | D.F. | Butcher | 2nd Bn Rhodesia Regiment |
| 1936 | Pipe Maj | A. | Macbean | 1st Bn Rhodesia Regiment |
| 1937 | Rfn | P.J. | Cumming | 1st Bn Rhodesia Regiment |
| 1938 | Lt | F.H. | Morgan MBE (5) | 2nd Bn Rhodesia Regiment |
| 1939 | Sgt | D.F. | Butcher (2) | The Rhodesia Regiment |
| 1948 | Sgt Maj | W.D.P. | Cook | 1st Bn Royal Rhodesia Regiment |
| 1949 | Sgt | G. | Lamont | 2nd Bn Royal Rhodesia Regiment |
| 1950 | Sgt | G. | Lamont (2) | 2nd Bn Royal Rhodesia Regiment |
| 1951 | Sgt | G. | Lamont (3) | 2nd Bn Royal Rhodesia Regiment |
| 1952 | Inspector | H.R. | Cooke | British South Africa Police |
| 1953 | Capt | R.V. | Allan DFC | 1st Bn Royal Rhodesia Regiment |
| 1954 | Rfn | A.D. | Scates | 1st Bn Royal Rhodesia Regiment |
| 1956 | S Sgt | D. | Hollingworth | British South Africa Police |
| 1957 | S Sgt | D. | Hollingworth (2) | British South Africa Police |
| 1958 | Lt | M.C. | Godfrey | Central Africa Command Training School (School of Infantry) |
| 1959 | Capt | M.C. | Godfrey (2) | 1st King's African Rifles |
| 1962 | Inspector | D. | Hollingworth (3) | British South Africa Police |
| 1963 | Inspector | D. | Hollingworth (4) | British South Africa Police |
| 1964 | Inspector | B.W. | Pratt | British South Africa Police |
| 1965 | Inspector | W.H. | Osborne | British South Africa Police |
| 1966 | WO2 | A.K. | Tourle | 1st Rhodesian Light Infantry |
| 1967 | Sgt | M.J. | Cary | 1 Engineer Squadron |
| 1968 | Inspector | D.G. | Toddun | British South Africa Police |
| 1969 | C Sgt | P.F.G. | Maunder | Special Air Service |

=== South Africa ===
The first King's Medal Competition in the Union of South Africa was held in 1924 and the first medal to a South African was won by G.W. Church of the 7th Infantry (Kimberley Regiment). The competition did not take place in 1926 and was interrupted from 1940 to 1947 by the Second World War. The last medal was awarded in 1961, the year that South Africa became a republic. From 1962, the British medal was replaced by the Commandant General's Medal (Afrikaans: Kommandant-Generaalsmedalje), which could be awarded to champions from any of the three Arms of the Service.

| Year | Rank | Initials | Surname | Unit or Formation |
|---|---|---|---|---|
| 1924 | | G.W. | Church | 7th Infantry (Kimberley Regiment) |
| 1925 | Maj | R. | Bodley | 5th Mounted Rifles (Imperial Light Horse) |
| 1927 | Sgt | L.D. | Busschau | 8th Infantry (Transvaal Scottish) |
| 1928 | Sgt | L.D. | Busschau (2) | 8th Infantry (Transvaal Scottish) |
| 1929 | | R.E. | Neville | Durban & Coast Defence Rifle Association |
| 1930 | Capt | H.A. | Viljoen | Phillippolis Defence Rifle Association |
| 1931 | | G.W. | Church (2) | 7th Infantry (Kimberley Regiment) |
| 1932 | Col | F.L.A. | Buchanan MC VD | Active Citizen Force, OC 1st Infantry Brigade |
| 1933 | Lt | M.J.G. | Bodley | East Rand Defence Rifle Association |
| 1934 | | L. | Towne | Albany Defence Rifle Association, Grahamstown |
| 1935 | Lt | J. | Liebman | Witwatersrand Rifles |
| 1936 | | O.M. | Peckham | Maritzburg Defence Rifle Association No 24. |
| 1937 | Lt | J. | Liebman (2) | Witwatersrand Rifles |
| 1938 | Capt | J. | Liebman (3) | Witwatersrand Rifles |
| 1939 | Capt | R.E. | Bodley | Imperial Light Horse |
| 1948 | Lt | D.C.P. | Welch | Rand Light Infantry |
| 1949 | S Sgt | J.J. | Bezuidenhout | Technical Services Corps |
| 1950 | Pte | J.M. | Potgieter | Kirkwood Rifle Commando |
| 1951 | Sgt | R.V.E. | Smith | Pietermaritzburg Rifle Commando |
| 1952 | WO2 | P. | Waterfall | South African Infantry Corps |
| 1953 | WO2 | J.J. | Bezuidenhout (2) | Technical Services Corps |
| 1954 | WO2 | P. | Waterfall (2) | South African Infantry Corps |
| 1955 | WO2 | P. | Waterfall (3) | South African Infantry Corps |
| 1956 | S Sgt | W.H. | Page | Technical Services Corps |
| 1957 | Lt | A.J. | Maartens | Central South West African Rifle Commando |
| 1958 | WO2 | P. | Waterfall (4) | South African Infantry Corps |
| 1959 | WO2 | J.J. | Bezuidenhout (3) | Technical Services Corps |
| 1960 | Cpl | W.J. | Scholtz | Thabazimbi Commando |
| 1961 | WO1 | P. | Waterfall (5) | South African Infantry Corps |

=== Trinidad and Tobago ===
The Queen's Medal Competition was introduced in Trinidad and Tobago in 1970, but the first medal was only awarded in 1972, to Lance Corporal F.P. Marcano of the 1st Battalion Trinidad and Tobago Regiment. The medal was won only two more times, in 1973 and 1975.

| Year | Rank | Initials | Surname | Unit or Formation |
|---|---|---|---|---|
| 1972 | L Cpl | F.P. | Marcano | 1st Battalion Trinidad and Tobago Regiment |
| 1973 | Pte | R. | Mclean | 1st Battalion Trinidad and Tobago Regiment |
| 1975 | Maj | J.L. | Theodore | 1st Battalion Trinidad and Tobago Regiment |

== Description ==
The first few medals of the original Queen Victoria version were struck in bronze, but in 1872 it was ordained that it should be of silver. It is a disk, 36 millimetres (1.42 inches) in diameter, with a raised rim on each side and suspended from a straight silver bar, swivelling on some versions. On the Queen Victoria version, the suspender is affixed to the medal by means of a double-toe claw and a pin through the upper edge of the medal. On the Kings' versions and the first Queen Elizabeth II version, the attachment is by a single-toe claw. On the second Queen Elizabeth II version, the suspension is either riveted or welded to the top of the medal.

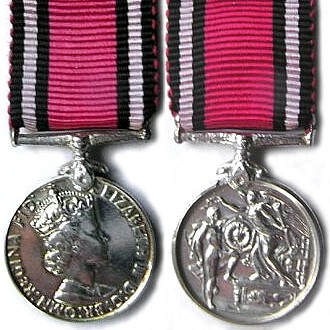
First Queen Elizabeth II version

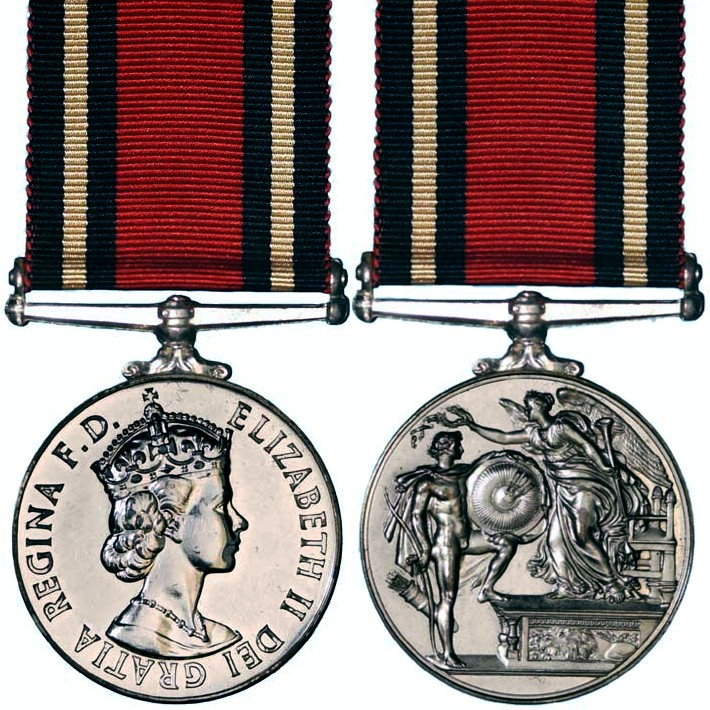
Second Queen Elizabeth II version

Obverse

The obverse bears the effigy of the reigning monarch. Seven versions of the medal have been awarded.

- The original Queen Victoria version of 1869 has her diademed and veiled effigy, facing left, and is circumscribed "VICTORIA REGINA". It was designed by British medallist L.C. Wyon.
- The first King George V version of 1923 shows him in Field Marshal's uniform, facing left, and is circumscribed "GEOGIVS V BRITT: OMN: REX ET IND: IMP:".
- The second King George V version was awarded from 1933 to 1936 and shows him crowned and in coronation robes, facing left. It is circumscribed "GEORGIVS•V•D•G•BRITT•OMN•REX•ET•INDIÆ•IMP•".
- The first King George VI version was introduced after his succession to the throne in 1936 and has his effigy in coronation robes, facing left and circumscribed "GEORGIVS•VI•D•G•BR•OMN•REX•ET•INDIÆ•IMP•".
- The second King George VI version was introduced after 1947, when his title "Emperor of India" was abandoned and the reference to India was omitted from the medal inscription. The effigy on the obverse remained the same, but the circumscription was changed to "GEORGIVS VI DEI GRA BRITT: OMN: REX FID: DEF:".
- The first Queen Elizabeth II version was introduced after her succession to the throne in 1952. It has her crowned effigy, facing right, and is circumscribed "ELIZABETH II D: G: BR: OMN: REGINA F: D:", reading around from the top. The effigy was designed by sculptor Cecil Thomas OBE and was used on a number of medals.
- The second Queen Elizabeth II version was introduced after her coronation in 1953. This version has the same effigy as the first, but is circumscribed "ELIZABETH II DEI GRATIA REGINA F. D.", reading around from the top.

Reverse

The reverse shows the winged mythological goddess Pheme, with a trumpet in her left hand and rising from her throne to crown a warrior with a laurel wreath. At left is the naked and cloaked warrior, with his left foot on the throne dais, a bow and a quiver of arrows in his right hand and supporting a target with three arrows through its centre on his left knee. The design was by Sir Edward John Poynter, 1st Baronet PRA, and the original die was engraved by L.C. Wyon.

Clasp

The medal can be won multiple times. Each subsequent award is indicated by the award of another clasp, which displays the year of the subsequent award. The clasps are designed to be attached to the suspender and to each other with rivets, in roller chain fashion. When medals are not worn, the award of second and subsequent clasps are denoted by silver rosettes on the ribbon bar. Since it is impossible to sew more than four rosettes onto a single ribbon bar and since several champions have won the award more than five times, gold rosettes were introduced to cover situations where more than five championships have been won.

Ribbon

The ribbon is 32 millimetres wide and dark crimson, with a 3 millimetres wide black band, a 3 millimetres wide beige band and a 3 millimetres wide black band on each edge.
