= King's Medal for Champion Shot =

Canadian military marksmanship medal

- Type: Military marksmanship medal
- Country: Canada
- Presented by: The monarch of Canada
- Eligibility: All ranks (Regular Force, Reserve Force & RCMP)
- Clasps: Displaying year of award
- Status: Current
- Established: 1991
- First award: 1992
- Ribbon bar

Order of wear
- Next (higher): Peace Officer Exemplary Service Medal
- Next (lower): Ontario Medal for Good Citizenship
- Related: Queen's Medal for Champion Shots in the Military Forces

The King's Medal for Champion Shot (French: Médaille du Roi pour tireur d'élite) is a Canadian medal instituted on 28 August 1991 to honour one member each of the Canadian Armed Forces (CF) Regular Force and either the CF Reserve Force or the Royal Canadian Mounted Police (RCMP) who obtained the highest aggregate score in stages one and two of the King's Medal Competition. It replaced its British counterpart, the Queen's Medal for Champion Shots in the Military Forces, after 1992. In respect of the Canadian Regular Force, the British medal could only be won by Army members, whereas the Canadian medal can be won by members of the Canadian Forces.

== History ==
The Medal for the Best Shot in the British Army, Infantry, was instituted by Queen Victoria in 1869 and awarded from 1870 to 1882 to the best shot of the annual army shooting competition. In 1923, the medal was re-introduced by King George V and designated the King's Medal for Champion Shots in the Military Forces. It could then be awarded to the champions of army marksmanship competitions, held under battle conditions, at annual central meetings in the United Kingdom, the British Dominions, Colonies, and India.

The first King's Medal competition in Canada was held for the Canadian Regular Force in 1923 and one King's Medal for Champion Shots in the Military Forces was awarded annually from that year. Beginning in 1963, two medals were awarded in Canada annually, the second to a member of either the Royal Canadian Mounted Police or the Canadian Reserve Force. A distinct Canadian version of the medal, the Queen's Medal for Champion Shot, was instituted in 1991 and the British version of the medal ceased to be awarded in Canada the following year.

Uniquely, it is the only medal in the long list of Canadian honours and awards that is won in open competition; all other honours are either awarded or earned.

== Design ==
The pre-2002 version of the medal

The medal was designed by Bruce W. Beatty, taking the form of a 36 millimetres (1.4 in) diameter disk with a raised edge. During the reign of Elizabeth II, it displayed on the obverse a crowned effigy of the Queen, circumscribed by the Latin words ELIZABETH II DEI GRATIA REGINA • CANADA (Elizabeth II, by the Grace of God, Queen • Canada), symbolizing her roles as both fount of honour and Commander-in-Chief of the Canadian Forces.

The reverse shows the winged mythological goddess Pheme, with a trumpet in her left hand and rising from her throne to crown a warrior with a laurel wreath. At left is the naked and cloaked warrior, with his left foot on the throne dais, a bow and a quiver of arrows in his right hand and supporting a target with three arrows through its centre on his left knee. The design, by Sir Edward John Poynter, was first used on the reverse of the 1869 Medal for the Best Shot in the British Army, Infantry.

Prior to 2002, the medal was joined to a straight suspender by a single-toe claw. After that date, the medal is suspended from a straight slotted bar with a fleur de lis decoration. The medal is worn at the left chest, suspended on a 32 millimetres wide ribbon coloured with a central vertical band in dark crimson, bordered on both sides with 9 millimetres wide black bands, each with a 3 millimetres wide beige band in the middle. The date the award was won is marked on a silver bar worn on the ribbon. The medal can be won multiple times, with each subsequent award indicated by an additional bar displaying the year in which it was won. Since 2002, the bars have been sewn centred onto the ribbon, whereas, before 2002, they were riveted to the medal's suspension, in roller chain fashion. When medals are not worn, the award of second and subsequent clasps are denoted by silver rosettes on the ribbon bar. As no more than four rosettes can fit onto a ribbon bar, for those who have won the award more than five times, gold rosettes were introduced.

== Eligibility and receipt ==
From 1924 to 1991, the eligibility for the Queen's Medal included various combinations of regular, reserve and Royal Canadian Mounted Police.

For example, from 1963, members of the Royal Canadian Mounted Police (RCMP) competed against the Canadian Army (Militia) and from 1968 the Canadian Forces (Reserve).

From 1954 to 1967, the Royal Canadian Air Force had its own Queen's Medal.

Year	Rank	Name or Initials	Surname	Category of award	Regiment or Corps	Remarks
1924	Corporal	W. J.	Livingstone	Regular Forces	The Governor General's Foot Guards	
1925	Lieutenant	Desmond Thomas (Des)	Burke	Regular Forces	The Governor General's Foot Guards	
1926	Corporal	W. J.	Livingstone	Regular Forces	The Governor General's Foot Guards	
1927	Lieutenant	Desmond Thomas	Burke (2)	Regular Forces	The Governor General's Foot Guards	
1928	Major	John	Jeffrey (OBE MC)	Regular Forces	Royal Canadian Regiment	
1929	Lieutenant	Desmond Thomas	Burke (3)	Regular Forces	The Governor General's Foot Guards	
1930	Lieutenant	Desmond Thomas	Burke (4)	Regular Forces	The Governor General's Foot Guards	
1931	Lieutenant	Desmond Thomas	Burke (5)	Regular Forces	The Governor General's Foot Guards	
1932	Captain	James William (Jim)	Houlden	Regular Forces	The Sherbrooke Regiment	
1933	Lieutenant	Allan Benson	Coulter (OBE, ED)	Regular Forces	The Governor General's Foot Guards	
1934	Captain	James William	Houlden (2)	Regular Forces	The Sherbrooke Regiment	
1935	Sergeant	Thomas William	Gregory	Regular Forces	7th BN CMG Corps	The 1938 competition was won by LAC T. W. Gregory who had previously won the medal in 1935 as a member of the Regular Army. He was, however, ineligible to win the medal as he was a member of the RCAF. He later went on to win the RCAF medal in 1955.
1936	Lance Corporal	C.	Robins	Regular Forces	Princess Patricia's Canadian Light Infantry	
1937	Lieutenant	George Alastair	Molecey	Regular Forces	Canadian Irish Fusiliers	
1938	Private	F.	Wallace	Regular Forces	48 Highlanders of Canada	The 1938 competition was won by LAC T. W. Gregory who had previously won the medal in 1935 as a member of the Regular Army. He was, however, ineligible to win the medal as he was a member of the RCAF. He later went on to win the RCAF medal in 1955.
1939	Captain	Desmond Thomas	Burke (6)	Regular Forces	The Governor General's Foot Guards	
1940			Not Contested			
1941			Not Contested			
1942			Not Contested			
1943			Not Contested			
1944			Not Contested			
1945			Not Contested			
1946			Not Contested			
1947	Major	Desmond Thomas	Burke (7)	Regular Forces	RCAMC	
1948	Lieutenant	R. F. P.	Fendick	Regular Forces	RCEME, RCOC	
1949	Officer Cadet	Gilmour S.	Boa	Regular Forces	48th Highlanders of Canada	
1950	Lieutenant	Gilmour S.	Boa (2)	Regular Forces	48th Highlanders of Canada	
1951	Lieutenant	Gilmour S.	Boa (3)	Regular Forces	48th Highlanders of Canada	
1952	Lieutenant-Colonel	Stephen F. (Steve)	Johnson O.B.E., E.D.	Regular Forces	14th Armoured Regiment (King's Own Calgary Regiment)	
1953	Lieutenant	A. H.	McKeage	Canadian Army (Regular) and Royal Canadian Mounted Police	Canadian Grenadier Guards	
1954	Captain	D. C.	Lawford	Canadian Army (Regular) and Royal Canadian Mounted Police	1st Canadian Signals Regiment	
1954	Flight Sergeant	J. V. P.	Martin CD	Royal Canadian Air Force	unknown	RCAF Routine Order 502. First year of a medal specifically for RCAF.
1955	2nd Lieutenant	Edson Lyman	Warner	Canadian Army (Regular) and Royal Canadian Mounted Police	The Sherbrooke Regiment (12th Armoured Regiment)	
1955	Flight Sergeant	Thomas William	Gregory CD*	Royal Canadian Air Force	unknown	RCAF Routine Order 415
1956	Sergeant	J. R.	Hardy	Canadian Army (Regular) and Royal Canadian Mounted Police	RCEME	
1956	Corporal	S.	Goddard	Royal Canadian Air Force	unknown	RCAF Routine Order 14-Sep-56
1957	Lieutenant	A. S.	Derrick	Canadian Army (Regular) and Royal Canadian Mounted Police	RCSME, RCE	
1957	Leading Aircraftman	David Anthony	Green	Royal Canadian Air Force	unknown	RCAF Routine Order 57
1958	Staff-Sergeant	Leslie Alfred	White (MMM CD)	Canadian Army (Regular) and Royal Canadian Mounted Police	Royal Canadian School of Infantry, PPCLI	
1958	Leading Aircraftman	George Ezra	Sannachan	Royal Canadian Air Force	unknown	RCAF Routine Order 108
1959	Captain	John. J.	Barrett CD	Canadian Army (Regular) and Royal Canadian Mounted Police	Army Headquarters, Royal Canadian Regiment	
1959	Flight Sergeant	Robert Herbert	Cunnington CD	Royal Canadian Air Force	unknown	RCAF Routine Order 161
1960	WOII	C. F.	Rowell C.D.	Canadian Army (Regular) and Royal Canadian Mounted Police	RCS of I, Regiment of Canadian Guards	
1960	Flight Sergeant	James William	Brown CD	Royal Canadian Air Force	unknown	RCAF Routine Order 213
1961	Private	J. William	Matthews	Canadian Army (Regular) and Royal Canadian Mounted Police	PPCLI	179/200
1961	Corporal	A. F.	O'Brien	Royal Canadian Air Force	unknown	RCAF Routine Order 265
1962	Lieutenant	D. K.	Lidgren	Canadian Army (Regular) and Royal Canadian Mounted Police	RCS of I, PPCLI	
1962	Corporal	A. F.	O'Brien (2)	Royal Canadian Air Force	unknown	RCAF Routine Order 318
1963	Sergeant	Joseph Eloi (Jos)	Daigle (MMM)	Canadian Army (Regular) and Royal Canadian Mounted Police	Royal 22e Régiment	
1963	Lance Sergeant	T. A. P. (Tommy)	Richardson	Canadian Army (Militia) and The Royal Canadian Mounted Police	Victoria Rifles of Canada	
1963	Flying Officer	O. John	Ruckpaul	Royal Canadian Air Force	RCAF Station Centralia	RCAF Routine Order 36/63
1964	Lieutenant	William J. (Bill)	Molnar	Canadian Army (Regular)	The Black Watch (Royal Highland Regiment)	
1964	Staff Sergeant	Clément (Clem)	Tremblay CD	Canadian Army (Militia) and The Royal Canadian Mounted Police	Les Voltigeurs de Quebec	
1964	Leading Aircraftman	Charles Ronald Edgaley	Wesley	Royal Canadian Air Force	unknown	RCAF Routine Order 36/64
1965	Sergeant	Ralph E.	Bennett	Canadian Army (Regular)	RCE (Army Survey Establishment)	
1965	Sergeant	G. C.	Campbell	Canadian Army (Militia) and The Royal Canadian Mounted Police	Royal Westminster Regiment	
1965	Corporal	Harrison Ross	Peters CD	Royal Canadian Air Force	unknown	RCAF Routine Order 41/65
1966	Sergeant	Joseph Eloi	Daigle (2) (MMM)	Canadian Army (Regular)	3 Bn, Royal 22e Régiment	
1966	Private	Robert Douglas (Bob)	Clerk	Canadian Army (Militia) and The Royal Canadian Mounted Police	Royal Montreal Regiment	
1966	Flight Lieutenant	O. John	Ruckpaul (2)(CD)	Royal Canadian Air Force	CFB Cold Lake	unknown
1967	Corporal	K. A.	Fleming	Canadian Army (Regular)	RCOC	
1967	Staff Sergeant	Larry	Fish	Canadian Army (Militia) and The Royal Canadian Mounted Police	The Lorne Scots (Peel, Dufferin and Halton Regiment)	
1967	Flight Lieutenant	M. D.	Phoenix CD	Royal Canadian Air Force	unknown	Last year of a medal specifically for RCAF.
1968	Corporal	Laval	Mercier	Canadian Forces (Regular)	3 Bn, Royal 22e Régiment	
1968	Major	Edson Lyman	Warner CD (2)	Canadian Forces (Reserve) and The Royal Canadian Mounted Police	The Sherbrooke Hussars	see 1955
1969	MWO	Leslie Alfred	White (2) (MMM CD)	Canadian Forces (Regular)	Canadian Airborne Regiment	
1969	Major	Edson Lyman	Warner CD (3)	Canadian Forces (Reserve) and The Royal Canadian Mounted Police	The Sherbrooke Hussars	
1970	Sergeant	Joseph Eloi	Daigle (3) (MMM CD)	Canadian Forces (Regular)	3 Bn, Royal 22e Régiment	
1970	Sergeant	Gordon Wilfred (Wilf)	Black	Canadian Forces (Reserve) and The Royal Canadian Mounted Police	Royal Canadian Mounted Police "A" Division	
1971	Master Corporal	Joseph Rudolph	Hennick CD	Canadian Forces (Regular)	1 Bn, Royal Canadian Regiment	681 (Record Score) (C1A1)
1971	Major	Edson Lyman	Warner CD (4)	Canadian Forces (Reserve) and The Royal Canadian Mounted Police	The Sherbrooke Hussars	
1972	Warrant Officer	L. G.	Glibbery	Canadian Forces (Regular)	3 Bn, Royal Canadian Regiment	
1972	Major	Edson Lyman	Warner CD (5)	Canadian Forces (Reserve) and The Royal Canadian Mounted Police	The Sherbrooke Hussars	
1973	Sergeant	Rosario (Happy)	L'Heureux	Canadian Forces (Regular)	3 Bn, Royal 22e Régiment	
1973	Lieutenant	William (Bill)	Kedziora (CD)	Canadian Forces (Reserve) and The Royal Canadian Mounted Police	Royal Hamilton Light Infantry	
1974	Sergeant	Laval	Mercier (2)	Canadian Forces (Regular)	3 Bn, Royal 22e Régiment	
1974	Staff Sergeant	Gordon Wilfred	Black (2)	Canadian Forces (Reserve) and The Royal Canadian Mounted Police	Royal Canadian Mounted Police "A" Division	
1975	Sergeant	Laval	Mercier (3)	Canadian Forces (Regular)	3 Bn, Royal 22e Régiment	
1975	Warrant Officer	G. N.	Senetchko	Canadian Forces (Reserve) and The Royal Canadian Mounted Police	Queen's Own Rifles of Canada	
1976				Regular Forces	No competition due to Olympic Games	
1976	Lieutenant	Richard	Savinski	Canadian Forces (Reserve) and The Royal Canadian Mounted Police	Le Regiment du Saguenay	No explanation on why only a Reserve Force competition was held.
1977	Sergeant	E. J.	Luscombe	Canadian Forces (Regular)	3 Bn PPCLI	
1977	Captain	K. K.	Nicholson	Canadian Forces (Reserve) and The Royal Canadian Mounted Police	The Elgin Regiment	
1978	Corporal	Henry (Hawk)	McKay	Canadian Forces (Regular)	2 Bn, Royal Canadian Regiment	
1978	Corporal	David D.	Oakie	Canadian Forces (Reserve) and The Royal Canadian Mounted Police	Royal Montreal Regiment	
1979	Master Corporal	Antony. M.	Cromwell	Canadian Forces (Regular)	Canadian Airborne Regiment	
1979	Corporal	David D.	Oakie (2)	Canadian Forces (Reserve) and The Royal Canadian Mounted Police	The Loyal Edmonton Regiment	
1980	Sergeant	Hector B.	McLellan	Canadian Forces (Regular)	Canadian Airborne Regiment	
1980	Lieutenant	Kenneth E. (Ken)	Ferguson	Canadian Forces (Reserve) and The Royal Canadian Mounted Police	1st Battalion Nova Scotia Highlanders (North)	
1981	Warrant Officer	Joseph Ronald Alfred (Ron)	Surette	Canadian Forces (Regular)	2 Bn The Royal Canadian Regiment	
1981	Lieutenant	Kenneth E.	Ferguson (2)	Canadian Forces (Reserve) and The Royal Canadian Mounted Police	1st Battalion Nova Scotia Highlanders (North)	
1982	Master Corporal	Daniel L. V.	Demeuse	Canadian Forces (Regular)	3 Bn, Royal 22e Régiment	
1982	Lieutenant	M. Ross	Williams	Canadian Forces (Reserve) and The Royal Canadian Mounted Police	Queen's Own Rifles of Canada	
1983	Warrant Officer	Joseph Ronald Alfred	Surette (2)	Canadian Forces (Regular)	2 Bn The Royal Canadian Regiment	
1983	Lieutenant	M. Ross	Williams (2)	Canadian Forces (Reserve) and The Royal Canadian Mounted Police	Queen's Own Rifles of Canada	
1984	Warrant Officer	Joseph Ronald Alfred	Surette (3)	Canadian Forces (Regular)	2 Bn The Royal Canadian Regiment	
1984	Lieutenant	Kenneth E.	Ferguson (3)	Canadian Forces (Reserve) and The Royal Canadian Mounted Police	1st Battalion Nova Scotia Highlanders (North)	
1985	Warrant Officer	Joseph Ronald Alfred	Surette (4)	Canadian Forces (Regular)	2 Bn The Royal Canadian Regiment	
1985	Lieutenant	Kenneth E.	Ferguson (4)	Canadian Forces (Reserve) and The Royal Canadian Mounted Police	1st Battalion Nova Scotia Highlanders (North)	
1986	Warrant Officer	Joseph Rino (Rino)	Levesque MMM CD	Canadian Forces (Regular)	3 Bn, Royal 22e Régiment	
1986	Sergeant	George Joseph	West	Canadian Forces (Reserve) and The Royal Canadian Mounted Police	Royal Hamilton Light Infantry	
1987	Warrant Officer	Joseph Rino	Levesque (2) MMM CD	Canadian Forces (Regular)	3 Bn, Royal 22e Régiment	Last Year with FN C1A1 rifle
1988	Captain	Steve	Tibbetts	Canadian Forces (Regular)	2 Bn, Royal Canadian Regiment	1st Year with C7 rifle
1988	Private	Shannon M.	Wills	Canadian Forces (Reserve) and The Royal Canadian Mounted Police	12 (Vancouver) Service Battalion	1st Year with C7 rifle. Private Wills was the first woman in history to win the Queen's Medal.
1989	Sergeant	Stephen G.	Hitchcock CD	Canadian Forces (Regular)	3rd Bn PPCLI	686/755
1989	Warrant Officer	Joseph Ronald Alfred (Ron)	Surette (5)	Canadian Forces (Reserve) and The Royal Canadian Mounted Police	Royal New Brunswick Regiment	WO Surette had 5 previous Queen's Medals in the Regular Force
1990	Master Corporal	Wallace Todd	Smith	Canadian Forces (Regular)	2 Bn, Royal Canadian Regiment	
1990	Lieutenant	Kenneth E.	Ferguson (5)	Canadian Forces (Reserve) and The Royal Canadian Mounted Police	1st Battalion Nova Scotia Highlanders (North)	
1991	Master Corporal	Fabian James	Snow	Canadian Forces (Regular)	2 Bn, Royal Canadian Regiment	
1991	Corporal	Martin E.	Paquette	Canadian Forces (Reserve) and The Royal Canadian Mounted Police	Les Fusiliers Mont-Royal	

All medal contenders have to be current serving members of the Armed Forces or Royal Canadian Mounted Police.

Two medals are awarded annually, one to the member of the Canadian Regular Force and one to the member of either the Canadian Reserve Force or the RCMP who obtains the highest aggregate score in stages one and two of the Queen's Medal Competition.

On 28 August 1991 a new Canadian Queen's Medal was introduced to replace the British-style award, and was first awarded in the summer of 1992, with one medal for each of the Regular Forces and the Reserves.

Year	Rank	Initials	Surname	Regular Force Unit or Formation
1992	MCpl	F.J. (Fabien)	Snow	2 Bn, The Royal Canadian Regiment
1993	Pte	B.E.	Walker	1 PPCLI
1994	Cpl	C.G.	Arevalo	Canadian Airborne Regiment
1995	Cpl	J.A.R.	Bergeron	1 Bn, Royal 22e Régiment
1996	Sgt	M.	Messier	1 Bn, Royal 22e Régiment
1997	Sgt	M.	Messier (2)	1 Bn, Royal 22e Régiment
1998	Sgt	M.	Messier CD (3)	1 Bn, Royal 22e Régiment
1999	Cpl	J.R.M.	Turcotte-Sorbonne	3 Bn, Royal 22e Régiment
2000	Cpl	S.	Deschesnes CD	1 Bn, Royal 22e Régiment
2001	MCpl	M.R.	Wood	1 PPCLI
2002	Pte	T.D.	Vanderlinden	2 Bn, The Royal Canadian Regiment
2003-2006	NIL	NIL	NIL	No Regular Force Competition
2007	Sgt	G.	McKillop	The Royal Canadian Regiment
2008	Cpl	J.	Grondin	EME branch, Land Forces Atlantic Area
2009	PO 1st Class	M.D. (Martin)	Cashin, MMM, CD	Canadian Forces Naval Engineering School
2010	Pte	T.	Hiscock	1 Bn, The Royal Canadian Regiment
2011	Capt	K. (Ken)	Barling	RCAF Aerospace Eng Support Sqd
2012	Capt	K. (Ken)	Barling (2)	RCAF Aerospace Eng Support Sqd
2013	Capt	K. (Ken)	Barling (3)	RCAF NORAD Colorado Springs
2014	Cpl	J.C.	Boivin-Couillard	2nd Canadian Division
2015	Cpl	D.J.R.	Michaud	2 Cdn Div (score 1232.093)
2016	Maj	K.W. (Ken)	Barling (4)	RCAF (score 1244.105)
2017	Pte	J.C. (Johnathan)	Sobczak	4 Cdn Div (score 1201.068)
2018	Lt	B.P.J. (Baron)	Hordo	2 Canadian Forces Flying Training School (score 1198.090)
2019	Cpl	S.	Turpin	5 Canadian Division Regular Force (score 1171.062)
2020			Not contested due to the pandemic	
2021			Not contested due to the pandemic	
2022			Not contested due to operational conflicts	
2023			Not contested due to operational conflicts	

Year	Rank	Initials	Surname	RCMP or Reserve Force Unit or Formation
1992	Cpl	E.	Chwastyk	Royal Hamilton Light Infantry (Wentworth Regiment)
1993	Cpl	T.H. (Tom)	Krahn	Princess of Wales Own Regiment
1994	Sgt	T.G.	Irving	4th Battalion, Royal Canadian Regiment
1995	MCpl	S.J.	Baker	Cameron Highlanders Of Ottawa (Duke of Edinburgh's Own)
1996	Lt	K.E. (Ken)	Ferguson CD (6) (Note: Lieutenant K.E. Ferguson won his first five medals, the Queen's Medal for Champion Shots in the Military Forces, in 1980, 1981, 1984, 1985 and 1990.)	1st Battalion, Nova Scotia Highlanders (North)
1997	WO	M.L. (Mike)	Gray CD	Princess Louise Fusiliers
1998	WO	J.R.A. (Ron)	Surette CD (6) (Note: Warrant Officer J.R.A. Surette won his first five medals, the Queen's Medal for Champion Shots in the Military Forces, as a Regular in 1981, 1983, 1984 and 1985 and as a Reservist in 1989.)	2nd Battalion, Royal New Brunswick Regiment
1999	Lt	K.E. (Ken)	Ferguson CD (7)	1st Battalion, Nova Scotia Highlanders (North)
2000	Sgt	J.C.	Carew CD	1st Battalion, The Royal Newfoundland Regiment
2001	Sgt	J.C.	Carew CD (2)	1st Battalion, The Royal Newfoundland Regiment
2002	MWO	M.L. (Mike)	Gray CD (2)	Princess Louise Fusiliers
2003	Sgt	S.P. (Sean)	Gagnon	The Governor General's Foot Guards
2004	MWO	M.L. (Mike)	Gray CD (3)	Princess Louise Fusiliers
2005	MWO	M.L. (Mike)	Gray CD (4)	Princess Louise Fusiliers
2006	MWO	M.L. (Mike)	Gray CD (5)	Princess Louise Fusiliers
2007	WO	G.	Desroches	Argyll and Sutherland Highlanders (Princess Louise's)
2008	Capt	S.P. (Sean)	Gagnon (2)	The Governor General's Foot Guards
2009	MBdr	W. (Will)	MacKeigan	5th (British Columbia) Field Artillery Regiment
2010	Cpl	D. (Dave)	Ferguson	1st Battalion, Nova Scotia Highlanders (Note: Corporal D Ferguson, QM, is the son of Lieutenant Ken Ferguson, QM, and brother of Corporal E Ferguson, QM)
2011	MWO	F. (François)	Duchesneau	2 Canadian Ranger Patrol Group
2012	Cpl	D. (Dave)	Ferguson (2)	Nova Scotia Highlanders (Note: Corporal E Ferguson, QM, is the son of Lieutenant Ken Ferguson, QM, and brother of Corporal D Ferguson, QM)
2013	Cpl	E. (Ed)	Ferguson	Nova Scotia Highlanders
2014	Cpl	J. (Jon)	Palmer	Nova Scotia Highlanders
2015	Cpl	E. (Ed)	Ferguson (2)	Nova Scotia Highlanders (score 1221.099)
2016	Cpl	D. (Dave)	Ferguson (3)	Nova Scotia Highlanders (score 1205.085)
2017	Cpl	D. (Dave)	Ferguson (4)	Nova Scotia Highlanders (score 1215.076)
2018	Cpl	T. (Timothy)	Nault	39 Signal Regiment (score 1198.092)
2019	Cpl	D. (Dave)	Ferguson (5)	Nova Scotia Highlanders (score 1184.082)
2020			Not contested due to the pandemic	
2021			Not contested due to the pandemic	
2022			Not contested due to operational conflicts	
2023			Not contested due to operational conflicts	
