= King's Medal for Champion Shots of the Air Forces =

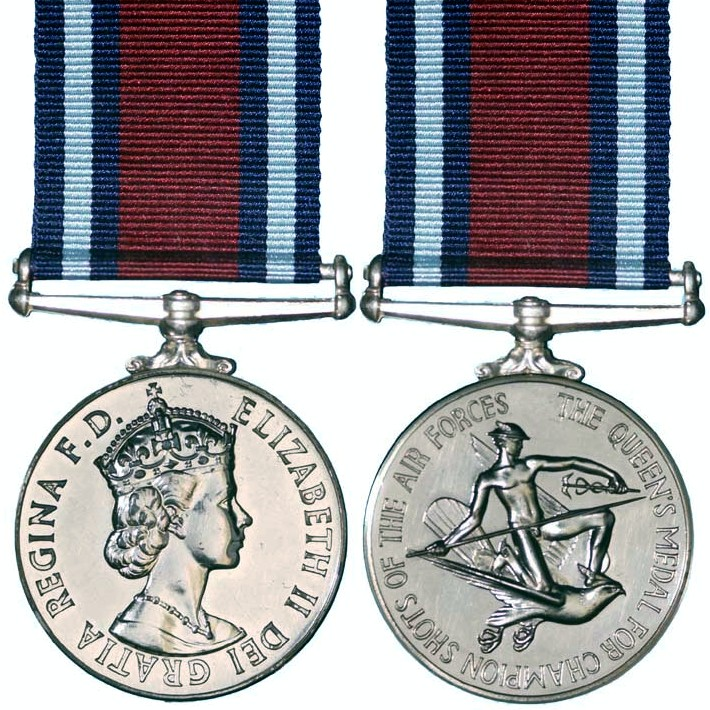
- Type: Military marksmanship medal
- Country: United Kingdom
- Presented by: The monarch of the United Kingdom and the Commonwealth realms
- Eligibility: All ranks
- Clasps: Displaying year of award
- Status: Current in United Kingdom and New Zealand
- Established: 1953
- First award: 1953
- Ribbon bar

Order of wear
- Next (higher): King's Medal for Champion Shots in the Military Forces
- Next (lower): Cadet Forces Medal

The King's Medal for Champion Shots of the Air Forces was instituted in 1953, as an Air Force version of the Queen's Medal for Champion Shots in the Military Forces. One medal each can be awarded to the champion shot of annual small arms marksmanship competitions held by the Air Forces of the United Kingdom and those member countries of the British Commonwealth whose Governments desire to take part in the grant of the award.

The Air Forces of countries that took part at some stage include the United Kingdom's Royal Air Force, the Royal Australian Air Force, the Royal Canadian Air Force, the Royal New Zealand Air Force and the Royal Rhodesian Air Force. Today, only the United Kingdom and New Zealand still award the medal.

== Origin ==
The Medal for the Best Shot in the British Army, Infantry, was instituted by Queen Victoria in 1869 and was awarded from 1870 to 1882 to the best shot of the annual Army shooting competition. In 1923 the medal was re-introduced by King George V and designated the King's Medal for Champion Shots in the Military Forces. It could now be awarded to the champions of Army marksmanship competitions, held under battle conditions, at annual central meetings in the United Kingdom, the British Dominions, Colonies and India.

All contenders for the King's/Queen's Medal for Champion Shots in the Military Forces have to be serving members of the Regular Army, Army Emergency Reserve, Territorial Army, or Local Militia and Volunteer Forces in the countries concerned. Members of independent Naval and Air Forces, while not excluded from the competition, could therefore not be awarded the medal even though they won the championship. This happened to an Air Force shot twice, in Canada in 1938 and in Rhodesia in 1962.

== Institution ==
The Queen's Medal for Champion Shots of the Air Forces was instituted by Queen Elizabeth II on 12 June 1953. Only one medal, or a clasp only, is granted annually in each of the Air Forces of the United Kingdom and those member countries of the British Commonwealth whose governments desire to take part in the grant of the award. Apart from the United Kingdom, the Dominions of Australia, Canada and New Zealand and the Colony of Rhodesia all took part at some stage, but only the United Kingdom and New Zealand still award the medal.

Every medal is awarded with a clasp, inscribed with the year of award and attached to the medal's suspension bar. Holders of the medal who qualify for a subsequent award, are awarded a clasp only, to be worn on the ribbon of the original medal and attached to the original or previous clasp. When medals are not worn, the award of second or further clasps are denoted on the ribbon bar by a silver rosette to denote the award of each additional clasp.

== Award criteria ==
The medal is awarded to the champion shot of the annual championship meeting of each respective Air Force, held under service rifle championship conditions. All medal contenders have to be actual serving members of the Regular Air Forces of the respective countries.

== Order of wear ==
In the order of wear prescribed by the British Central Chancery of the Orders of Knighthood, the King's Medal for Champion Shots of the Air Forces takes precedence after the King's Medal for Champion Shots in the Military Forces and before the Cadet Forces Medal.

== Participating countries ==
The tables below list the known recipients of the medal in the respective participating countries.

=== United Kingdom ===
In the United Kingdom, the first Royal Air Force championship to compete for the medal took place in 1953 and was won by Senior Technician J.E.P.P. Witts of RAF Stafford. The championship took place annually since then, except in 1991 when no competition was held as a result of the Gulf War. The record for the most wins of the Air Force medal is held by Chief Technician J.T. Prictor, who won the championship for the fourteenth time in 2009.

Year	Rank	Initials	Surname	Squadron or Formation
1953	SAC (T)	J.E.P.P.	Witts	RAF Stafford
1954	Sgt	C.H.	Greenlee	RAF Ballykelly
1955	Cpl Tech	B.R.	Creasey	RAF Wahn
1956	Sqn Ldr	C.C.	Willott OBE	RAF West Malling
1957	Flt Lt	M.	Gill	RAF Little Rissington
1958	Wg Cdr	P.E.H.	Thomas AFC	RAF Hornchurch
1959	Wg Cdr	P.E.H.	Thomas AFC (2)	RAF Hornchurch
1960	Sqn Ldr	D.H.	Young	RAF Hemswell
1961	WO	F.	Flanaghan	RAF Chigwell
1962	Chf Tech	B.R.	Creasey (2)	RAF West Raynham
1963	SAC (T)	D.J.	Limby	RAF Geilenkirchen
1964	Flt Lt	R.S.	Hassell	RAF Lindholme
1965	Cpl	R.N.	van Gelderen	RAF Gaydon
1966	Cpl	R.N.	van Gelderen (2)	RAF Gaydon
1967	Chf Tech	H.J.	Dillon-Lee	RAF Wattisham
1968	Sgt	R.N.	van Gelderen (3)	RAF Gaydon
1969	Sgt	R.N.	van Gelderen (4)	RAF Gaydon
1970	Sgt	R.N.	van Gelderen (5)	RAF Gaydon
1971	Sgt	R.N.	van Gelderen (6)	RAF Gaydon
1972	Sgt	R.N.	van Gelderen (7)	RAF Gaydon
1973	Flt Lt	G.	Cox	
1974	Chf Tech	D.D.	Watt	RAF Honington
1975	Sgt	P.A.	Moss	RAF Sealand
1976	Sgt	P.A.	Moss (2)	RAF Sealand
1977	Sgt	P.A.	Moss (3)	RAF Sealand
1978	Sgt	P.A.	Moss (4)	RAF Sealand
1979	Chf Tech	A.A.	Thompson	
1980	MAE	I.	Wilkinson	RAF Lyneham
1981	Cpl	P.W.	Raymond	RAF Abingdon
1982	Cpl	J.A.	Wyles	
1983	Flt Lt	D.P.	Calvert	
1984	Cpl	J.T.	Prictor	RAF Honington
1985	Cpl	P.W.	Raymond (2)	RAF Abingdon
1986	Cpl	J.T.	Prictor (2)	RAF Honington
1987	Cpl	I.L.	Vosper	RAF Cottesmore
1988	Cpl	J.T.	Prictor (3)	RAF Bruggen
1989	SAC	I.D.E.	Brown	RAF Catterick
1990	Sgt	J.T.	Prictor (4)	No. 9 Squadron RAF, RAF Bruggen
1992	FS	M.W.	Silver BEM	No. 19 Squadron RAF, RAF Aldergrove
1993	Sgt	P.	Barry	RAF Valley
1994	Sgt	D.B.	Vick	RAF Honington
1995	Sgt	J.T.	Prictor (5)	No. 9 Squadron RAF, RAF Bruggen
1996	Flt Lt	L.F.	Smith	No. 72 Squadron RAF, RAF Aldergrove
1997	Sgt	J.T.	Prictor (6)	No. 9 Squadron RAF, RAF Bruggen
1998	Flt Lt	L.F.	Smith (2)	Engineering Wing, RAF Coningsby
1999	Sgt	J.T.	Prictor (7)	RAF Kinloss
2000	Chf Tech	J.T.	Prictor (8)	MOD London, RAF Uxbridge
2001	Chf Tech	J.T.	Prictor (9)	MOD London, RAF Uxbridge
2002	Chf Tech	J.T.	Prictor (10)	RAF Cottesmore
2003	Chf Tech	J.T.	Prictor (11)	RAF Cottesmore
2004	Flt Lt	C.	Allen	RAF Wittering
2005	Sqn Ldr	L.F.	Smith (3)	5001 Squadron, RAF Stafford
2006	Chf Tech	J.T.	Prictor (12)	5131 (BD) Squadron, RAF Wittering
2007	Chf Tech	J.T.	Prictor (13)	5131 (BD) Squadron, RAF Wittering
2008	Flt Lt	D.B.	Vick (2)	RAF Honington
2009	Chf Tech	J.T.	Prictor (14)	5131 (BD) Squadron, RAF Wittering
2010	Sqn Ldr	L.F.	Smith (4)	HQ Air Command, RAF Halton
2011	Sqn Ldr	D.B.	Vick (3)	RAF Regiment, RAF Honington
2012	Sgt	P.	Hunter	
2013	Cpl	R.	Jamieson	RAF Regiment
2014	Cpl	R.	Jamieson (2)	RAF Regiment
2015	Cpl	R.	Jamieson (3)	RAF Regiment
2016	Sgt	A.	Lilley	RAF Waddington
2017	Cpl	M.	Keightley	RAF Northolt
2018	Sgt	A.	Lilley (2)	RAF Waddington
2019	FS	P.A.D.	Guard	RAF Odiham
2022	Cpl	N.	Webb	RAF Stafford
2023	Cpl	K.	Mitchell	RAF Northolt
2024	Cpl	N.	Webb (2)	RAF Lossiemouth
2025	WO	A.	Lilley (3)	RAF Waddington
2026	Cpl	N.	Webb (3)	RAF Lossiemouth

=== Australia ===
The first Royal Australian Air Force championship to compete for the medal took place in 1956 and the first medal to an Australian was won by Warrant Officer C.E.P. Hawes. The championship took place annually from then until 1987, except in 1963 when no competition was held. In 1988, the Champion Shots Medal was instituted in Australia and the Queen's Medal for Champion Shots of the Air Forces ceased to be awarded.

Year	Rank	Initials	Surname	Squadron or Formation
1956	WO	C.E.P.	Hawes	
1957	Cpl	P.R.	Beare	RAAF School of Technical Training, Wagga Wagga
1958	LAC	D.G.	Lamb	No. 2 Aircraft Depot
1959	AC	M.J.	Baxter	86 Wing
1960	Cpl	R.B.	Cook	Basic Flight Training Squadron
1961	Cpl	R.B.	Cook (2)	Basic Flight Training Squadron, Pt. Cook
1962	LAC	M.J.	Baxter (2)	16 Army Light Aircraft Squadron
1964	Sgt	G.	Wiles	
1965	Cpl	J.W.	Dewhurst	
1966	Cpl	R.J.	Rielly	
1967	Sgt	T.L.	Mitchell	
1968	Sgt	M.	Billett	
1969	Cpl	J.W.	Dewhurst (2)	
1970	FS	S.R.	Catts	
1971	FS	T.L.	Mitchell (2)	
1972	FS	T.L.	Mitchell (3)	
1973	Flt Lt	C.J.	Griffiths	
1974	LAC	G.	Thompson	
1975	Sgt	P.	Phillips	
1976	Sgt	P.	Phillips (2)	
1977	Cpl	G.	Thompson (2)	
1978	Cpl	G.T.	Pern	
1979	Cpl	G.	Thompson (3)	
1980	Sgt	J.L.	Hamilton	492 Squadron
1981	Sgt	J.L.	Hamilton (2)	492 Squadron
1982	Cpl	G.T.	Pern (2)	
1983	WO	P.	Phillips (3)	
1984	Sgt	B.G.	Hartman	MOVCORDC
1985	WO	J.L.	Hamilton (3)	
1986	FS	N.F.	Marxsen	
1987	Sgt	B.G.	Hartman (2)	MOVCORDC

=== Canada ===
The first Royal Canadian Air Force championship to compete for the medal took place in 1954 and the first medal to a Canadian was won by Flight Sergeant J.V.P. Martin CD. The championship took place annually from then until 1967, when the Canadian Army, the Royal Canadian Navy and the Royal Canadian Air Force were unified into the Canadian Armed Forces. As a result, the Queen's Medal for Champion Shots of the Air Forces ceased to be awarded and, from 1968, regular Canadian Air Force members competed with regular Army and Navy members for the Queen's Medal for Champion Shots in the Military Forces.

Year	Rank	Initials	Surname	Squadron or Formation
1954	FS	J.V.P.	Martin CD	
1955	Flt Lt	T.W.	Gregory CD	
1956	Cpl	S.	Goddard	
1957	LAC	D.A.	Green	
1958	LAC	G.E.	Sannachan	
1959	FS	R.H.	Cunnington CD	
1960	FS	J.W.	Brown CD	
1961	Cpl	A.F.	O'Brien	
1962	Cpl	A.F.	O'Brien (2)	
1963	Fg Off	O.J.	Ruckpaul CD	RCAF Station Centralia
1964	LAC	C.R.E.	Wesley	
1965	Cpl	H.R.	Peters CD	
1966	Flt Lt	O.J.	Ruckpaul CD (2)	CFB Cold Lake
1967	Flt Lt	M.D.	Phoenix CD	

=== New Zealand ===
The first Royal New Zealand Air Force championship to compete for the medal took place in 1954 and the first medal to a New Zealander was won by Warrant Officer F.A. Haycock. The championship, which is restricted to members of the regular Air Force, took place annually from then, except in 1966, 1967, 1996 and from 1998 to 2003, when no competition was held. The medal is still current in New Zealand.

Year	Rank	Initials	Surname	Squadron or Formation
1954	WO	F.A.	Haycock	
1955	LAC	M.W.P.	Godwin	
1956	WO	F.A.	Haycock (2)	
1957	WO	F.A.	Haycock (3)	
1958	Sgt	L.P.	Boyd	
1959	Sgt	C.G.	Robertson	
1960	LAC	H.V.	Childe	
1961	LAC	H.V.	Childe (2)	
1962	Sgt	C.G.	Robertson (2)	
1963	Flt Lt	G.C.	Derby	
1964	WO	F.A.	Haycock (4)	
1965	Sgt	P.J.	Sears	
1968	Flt Lt	A.E.	West	
1969	WO	C.G.	Robertson (3)	
1970	Sqn Ldr	A.E.	West (2)	
1971	WO	R.F.	Flutey	
1972	Cpl	W.H.	Wilkinson	
1973	FS	M.J.	Ross	
1974	Wg Cdr	G.C.	Derby (2)	
1975	Sgt	G.E.	Cuthbert	
1976	Sgt	G.E.	Cuthbert (2)	
1977	Sgt	G.E.	Cuthbert (3)	
1978	FS	A.W.	Schischka	
1979	FS	A.W.	Schischka (2)	
1980	FS	J.W.	Tasker	
1981	WO	M.J.	Gallagher	
1982	AC	V.J.	d'Ath	
1983	Fg Off	M.F.	Loughran	
1984	Sgt	D.M.	Craill	General Service Instructor
1985	Sqn Ldr	R.B.	Smith	
1986	Flt Lt	D.J.	Ashton	
1987	Sqn Ldr	R.B.	Smith (2)	
1988	Flt Lt	M.F.	Loughran (2)	
1989	Sgt	S.J.	Bakker	
1990	Wg Cdr	R.B.	Smith (3)	
1991	Cpl	S.R.	Meldrum	
1992	Cpl	J.M.	Kovacs	
1993	Cpl	J.M.	Kovacs (2)	
1994	Cpl	J.M.	Kovacs (3)	
1995	Cpl	B.W.	Large	
1997	Cpl	J.M.	Kovacs (4)	
2004	Sgt	S.R.	Meldrum (2)	

=== Rhodesia ===
The 1962 Rhodesian Army competition for the Queen's Medal for Champion Shots in the Military Forces was won by Corporal Technician B.T. Gilpin of Thornhill Air Base, a member of the Royal Rhodesian Air Force. Despite protests from the Army commanders, the Minister of Defence presented Gilpin with the Army medal. As a result of the controversy, Rhodesia sought and was granted the Crown's permission to introduce the Queen's Medal for Champion Shots of the Air Forces. The first Royal Rhodesian Air Force championship to compete for the Air Force medal took place in 1963, but the first medal award was backdated to 1962 and the first two medals were presented in December 1963, one to Gilpin and the other to the Air Force champion for 1963, Flight Lieutenant W.J. Geeringh. Gilpin's 1962 Army medal was returned and the 1962 Army runner-up, Inspector D. Hollingworth, was awarded a second clasp to his existing medal.

The championship took place annually from then until 1968, even after Rhodesia's Unilateral Declaration of Independence on 11 November 1965, until Rhodesia severed its ties with the British Crown on 2 March 1970 and, in that same year, instituted the President's Medal for Shooting of the Security Forces.

Year	Rank	Initials	Surname	Squadron or Formation
1962	Cpl Tech	B.T.	Gilpin	Thornhill Air Base
1963	Flt Lt	W.J.	Geeringh	RRAF
1966	Cpl	G.	Dartnell	Thornhill Air Base
1968	Flt Lt	W.J.	Geeringh (3)	RRAF

== Description ==
The medal was struck in silver and is a disk, 36 millimetres (1.42 inches) in diameter, with a raised rim on each side and suspended from a straight silver bar.

Obverse

The obverse bears the effigy of Queen Elizabeth II and is circumscribed "ELIZABETH II DEI GRATIA REGINA F. D.", reading around from the top. The effigy was designed by sculptor Cecil Thomas OBE and was used on a number of medals.

Reverse

The reverse shows Hermes, the mythological messenger of the gods, mounted on the back of a hawk in flight, with a javelin in his right hand and in his left a caduceus, two snakes wrapped around a winged staff. The image is circumscribed “THE QUEEN'S MEDAL FOR CHAMPION SHOTS OF THE AIR FORCES”. The reverse of the medal was designed by British sculptor Sir Bernard Sindall.

Clasp

Since the medal can be won multiple times, each subsequent award is indicated by the award of another clasp, which displays the year of the subsequent award. The clasps are designed to be attached to the suspender and to each other with rivets, in roller chain fashion. When medals are not worn, the award of second and subsequent clasps are denoted by silver rosettes on the ribbon bar. Since it is impossible to sew more than four rosettes onto a single ribbon bar and since several champions have won the award more than five times, gold rosettes were introduced to provide for situations where more than five championships have been won.

Ribbon

The ribbon is 32 millimetres wide and dark crimson with a 3 millimetres wide dark blue band, a 3 millimetres wide light blue band and a 3 millimetres wide dark blue band on each edge.
