= New Zealand honours order of wearing =

The order of wear for decorations and awards within New Zealand's honours system is published by the Department of the Prime Minister and Cabinet.

== Order of wear ==
Many awards come from the orders, decorations, and medals of the United Kingdom. Medals in bold are distinctly New Zealand awards.

=== Special awards ===
- Victoria Cross and **Victoria Cross for New Zealand** VC
- **New Zealand Cross** NZC
- George Cross GC

=== Orders ===
- Knight/Lady Companion of the Order of the Garter KG/LG
- Knight/Lady of Order of the Thistle KT/LT
- Knight/Dame Grand Cross of Order of the Bath GCB
- Member of the Order of Merit OM
- Member of the **Order of New Zealand** ONZ
- Baronet/Baronetess (Bt., Bart. or Btss.)
- Knight/Dame Grand Companion of the **New Zealand Order of Merit** GNZM (formerly Principal Companion of the New Zealand Order of Merit – PCNZM)
- Knight/Dame Grand Cross of the Order of St Michael and St George GCMG
- Knight/Dame Grand Cross of the Royal Victorian Order GCVO
- Knight/Dame Grand Cross of the Order of the British Empire GBE
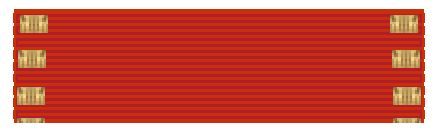
- Member of the Order of the Companions of Honour CH
- Knight/Dame Companion of the **New Zealand Order of Merit** KNZM/DNZM (formerly Distinguished Companion of the New Zealand Order of Merit – DCNZM)
- Knight/Dame Commander of the Order of the Bath KCB/DCB
- Knight/Dame Commander of the Order of St Michael and St George KCMG/DCMG
- Knight/Dame Commander of the Royal Victorian Order KCVO/DCVO
- Knight/Dame Commander Order of the British Empire KBE/DBE
- Knight Bachelor Confers the title of Sir with no postnominals
- Companion of the **New Zealand Order of Merit** CNZM
- Companion of the Order of the Bath CB
- Companion of the Order of St Michael and St George CMG
- Commander of the Royal Victorian Order CVO
- Commander of the Order of the British Empire CBE
- **New Zealand Gallantry Star** NZGS
- **New Zealand Bravery Star** NZBS
- Companion of the Distinguished Service Order DSO
- Lieutenant of the Royal Victorian Order LVO
- Companion of the **King's Service Order** KSO
- Officer of the **New Zealand Order of Merit** ONZM
- Officer of the Order of the British Empire OBE
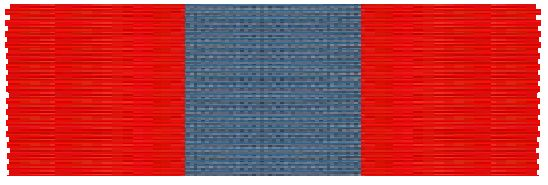
- Companion of the Imperial Service Order ISO
- Member of the Royal Victorian Order MVO
- Member of the **New Zealand Order of Merit** MNZM
- Member of the Order of the British Empire MBE

=== Decorations ===
- **New Zealand Gallantry Decoration** NZGD
- **New Zealand Bravery Decoration** NZBD
- Member of the Royal Red Cross RRC
- Distinguished Service Cross DSC
- Military Cross MC
- Distinguished Flying Cross DFC
- Air Force Cross AFC
- Associate of the Royal Red Cross ARRC
- (Insert membership grade) of the Order of St John

- Grade I – Bailiff or Dame Grand Cross GCStJ
- Grade II – Knight or Dame of Justice or Grace KStJ or DStJ
- Grade III – Chaplain ChStJ
- Grade III – Commander CStJ
- Grade IV – Officer OStJ
- Grade V – Member MStJ
- Grade VI – Esquire EsqStJ

=== Medals for gallantry and bravery ===
- Distinguished Conduct Medal DCM
- Conspicuous Gallantry Medal CGM
- George Medal GM
- Distinguished Service Medal DSM (Imperial)
- Military Medal MM
- Distinguished Flying Medal DFM
- Air Force Medal AFM
- Queen's Gallantry Medal QGM
- **New Zealand Gallantry Medal** NZGM
- **New Zealand Bravery Medal** NZBM

=== Medals for meritorious service ===
- Royal Victorian Medal (Gold, Silver, Bronze) RVM
- **King's Service Medal** KSM
- **New Zealand Antarctic Medal** NZAM
- **New Zealand Distinguished Service Decoration** DSD
- British Empire Medal BEM
- Queen's Police Medal for Distinguished Service QPM
- Queen's Fire Service Medal for Distinguished Service QFSM

=== Campaign medals ===
(Worn in order of date of participation in campaign or operation for which awarded.)

see New Zealand campaign medals

=== Other service medals ===
- **New Zealand Special Service Medal (Nuclear Testing)**
- **New Zealand Special Service Medal (Asian Tsunami)**
- **New Zealand Special Service Medal (Erebus)**
- Polar Medal (In order of date of award.)
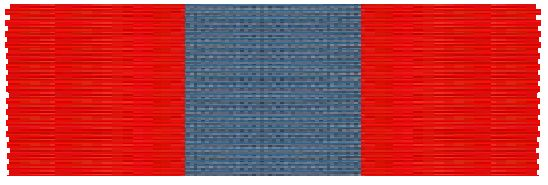
- Imperial Service Medal

=== Jubilee, Coronation and New Zealand Commemoration medals ===
- King George V Coronation Medal, 1911
- King George V Silver Jubilee Medal, 1935
- King George VI Coronation Medal, 1937
- Queen Elizabeth II Coronation Medal, 1953
- Queen Elizabeth II Silver Jubilee Medal, 1977
- Queen Elizabeth II Golden Jubilee Medal, 2002 (Only for personnel who were awarded the medal while a member of the British forces)
- Queen Elizabeth II Diamond Jubilee Medal, 2012
- Queen Elizabeth II Platinum Jubilee Medal, 2022
- King Charles III Coronation Medal, 2023
- **New Zealand 1990 Commemoration Medal**
- **New Zealand Suffrage Centennial Medal 1993**

=== Efficiency and long service decorations and medals ===
- New Zealand Meritorious Service Medal (formerly the Medal for Meritorious Service awarded only to members of the New Zealand Army)
- **New Zealand Defence Meritorious Service Medal**
- **New Zealand Police Meritorious Service Medal**
- **New Zealand Public Service Medal**
- **New Zealand Armed Forces Award**
- New Zealand Army Long Service and Good Conduct Medal (formerly the Long Service and Good Conduct Medal, Military)
- Royal New Zealand Navy Long Service and Good Conduct Medal
- Royal New Zealand Air Force Long Service and Good Conduct Medal
- **New Zealand Police Long Service and Good Conduct Medal**
- **New Zealand Fire Brigades Long Service and Good Conduct Medal**
- **New Zealand Prison Service Medal**
- **New Zealand Traffic Service Medal**
- **New Zealand Customs Service Medal**
- Efficiency Decoration ED
- Efficiency Medal
- Royal New Zealand Naval Reserve Decoration RD
- Royal New Zealand Naval Volunteer Reserve Decoration VRD
- Royal New Zealand Naval Volunteer Reserve Long Service and Good Conduct Medal
- Air Efficiency Medal AE (post-nominal used only when awarded to an officer)
- Queen's Medal For champion shots of the New Zealand Naval Forces
- Queen's Medal For champion shots of the Military Forces
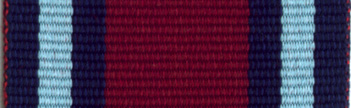
- Queen's Medal For champion shots of the Air Force
- Cadet Forces Medal

=== Service medals ===
- **New Zealand Defence Service Medal**

=== Commonwealth Independence medals ===
Instituted by the Sovereign. Worn in order of date of award.

- Papua New Guinea Independence Medal

=== Miscellaneous medals ===
- The Service Medal of the Order of St John

=== Commonwealth awards ===
Instituted by the Sovereign as Head of State, other than in right of New Zealand or the United Kingdom. Worn in order of date of award. At the discretion of the holder, a Commonwealth award may be worn in a position comparable to, but following, the equivalent New Zealand or British Order, Decoration or Medal.

- International Force East Timor Medal
- Australian Defence Medal (for ex-members of the ADF)

=== Other Commonwealth awards ===
Instituted by Commonwealth countries of which the Sovereign is not Head of State. Instituted since 1949, otherwise than by the Sovereign, and awards by the states of Malaysia and the State of Brunei. Worn in order of date of award. These awards may only be worn when The Sovereign’s permission has been given.

- Pingat Jasa Malaysia Medal

=== United States awards and decorations ===
These awards may only be worn when the Sovereign’s permission has been given.

- United States Bronze Star Medal
- United States Army Commendation Medal
- United States Army Achievement Medal
- United States Antarctica Service Medal

=== Foreign medals ===
- Korean War Service Medal
- South Vietnamese Campaign Medal
- Zimbabwe Independence Medal (Approved for restricted wear only)
- Kuwait Liberation Medal (Approved for restricted wear only)
- Multinational Force and Observers Medal
- Timor Leste Solidarity Medal

=== United Nations medals ===
- United Nations Truce Supervision Organisation Medal (UNTSO)
- United Nations Military Observer Group in India and Pakistan Medal (UNMOGIP)
- United Nations Service Medal for Korea
- United Nations Emergency Force Medal
- United Nations Observation Group in Lebanon (UNOGIL)
- United Nations Operation in the Congo (ONUC)
- United Nations Yemen Observation Mission (UNYOM)
- United Nations Peacekeeping Force in Cyprus (UNFICYP)
- United Nations India-Pakistan Observation Mission (UNIPOM)
- Second United Nations Emergency Force (UNEF II) – Middle East
- United Nations Disengagement Observer Force (UNDOF) – Golan Heights
- United Nations Interim Force in Lebanon (UNIFIL)
- United Nations Iran/Iraq Military Observer Group (UNIIMOG)
- United Nations Transition Assistance Group (UNTAG) – Namibia
- United Nations Angola Verification Mission (UNAVEM II and UNAVEM III) / United Nations Observer Mission in Angola (MONUA)
- United Nations Advance Mission in Cambodia (UNAMIC)
- United Nations Transitional Authority in Cambodia (UNTAC) / United Nations Military Liaison Team (UNMLT)
- United Nations Operations in Somalia (UNOSOM and UNOSOM II)
- United Nations Protection Force (UNPROFOR) – Former Yugoslavia / United Nations Confidence Restoration Operation (UNCRO) – Croatia
- United Nations Mission in Haiti (UNMIH)
- United Nations Operation in Mozambique (ONUMOZ)
- United Nations Preventive Deployment Force (UNPREDEP) – Former Yugoslav Republic of Macedonia
- United Nations Transitional Administration for Eastern Slavonia, Baranja and Western Sirmium (UNTAES)
- United Nations Mission of Observers in Prevlaka (UNMOP)
- United Nations Observer Mission in Sierra Leone (UNOMSIL) / United Nations Mission in Sierra Leone (UNAMSIL)
- United Nations Medal for East Timor (UNAMET) (UNTAET) (UNMISET)
- United Nations Interim Administration Mission in Kosovo (UNMIK)
- United Nations Mission in Sudan (UNMIS)
- United Nations Integrated Mission in Timor-Leste (UNMIT)
- United Nations Mission in South Sudan (UNMISS)
- United Nations Supervision Mission in Syria (UNSMIS)
- United Nations Special Service Medal

=== NATO medals ===
- NATO Medal for the Former Yugoslavia
- NATO Medal for Non-Article 5 Operations in the Balkans
- NATO Medal for the Non-Article 5 ISAF Operation in Afghanistan
- NATO Non-Article 5 Medal for Africa
- NATO Non-Article 5 Medal for Operation Resolute Support

=== CSDP medals ===
- Common Security and Defence Policy Service Medal
