= New Zealand campaign medals =

Military decorations of New Zealand

Prior to 1946 the New Zealand armed forces received honours of the United Kingdom, including military decorations and campaign medals. Since the end of World War 2 there have been constant moves towards an independent New Zealand honours system. This has resulted in a new system of New Zealand honours, gallantry and bravery awards, and campaign medals.

The following are a list, in order of precedence as defined in references below. Those campaign medals which have been independently issued by New Zealand to its armed forces are in bold.

== 19th century ==
- New Zealand War Medal

== South African War ==
- Queen's South Africa Medal
- King's South Africa Medal

== World War I ==
- 1914 Star
- 1914–15 Star
- British War Medal
- Mercantile Marine War Medal
- Victory Medal

== World War II ==
- 1939–1945 Star
- Atlantic Star
- Air Crew Europe Star
- Arctic Star
- Africa Star
- Pacific Star
- Burma Star
- Italy Star
- France and Germany Star
- Defence Medal
- War Medal 1939–1945
- **New Zealand War Service Medal**

== Post World War II ==
- **New Zealand Operational Service Medal**
- **New Zealand Service Medal 1946–1949**
- Korea Medal
- Naval General Service Medal (1915)
- General Service Medal 1918–62
- General Service Medal 1962
- Vietnam Medal
- Rhodesia Medal
- **New Zealand General Service Medal 1992 (Warlike)**
- **New Zealand General Service Medal 1992 (Non-Warlike)**
- **East Timor Medal**

== 21st century ==
- **NZGSM 2002 (Solomon Islands)**
- **NZGSM 2002 (Afghanistan) – Primary Operations Area**
- **NZGSM 2002 (Afghanistan) – Secondary Operations Area**
- **NZGSM 2002 (Iraq 2003)**
- **NZGSM 2002 (Timor-Leste)**
- **NZGSM 2002 (Korea)**
- **NZGSM 2002 (Counter-Piracy)**
- **NZGSM 2002 (Iraq 2015)**
- **NZGSM 2002 (Greater Middle East)**

== New Zealand Special Service Medals ==
- **New Zealand Special Service Medal (Nuclear Testing)**
- **New Zealand Special Service Medal (Erebus)**
- **New Zealand Special Service Medal (Asian Tsunami)**

== See also ==
- New Zealand Honours Order of Precedence
- Orders, decorations, and medals of New Zealand
- New Zealand gallantry awards
- New Zealand bravery awards
