= New Zealand General Service Medal 2002 =

New Zealand General Service Medal 2002 may refer to one of the following medals of New Zealand:

- New Zealand General Service Medal 2002 (Solomon Islands)
- New Zealand General Service Medal 2002 (Afghanistan), Primary Operations Area
- New Zealand General Service Medal 2002 (Afghanistan), Secondary Operations Area
- New Zealand General Service Medal 2002 (Iraq 2003)
- New Zealand General Service Medal 2002 (Timor-Leste)
- New Zealand General Service Medal 2002 (Korea)
- New Zealand General Service Medal 2002 (Greater Middle East)
- New Zealand General Service Medal 2002 (Iraq 2015)
- New Zealand General Service Medal 2002 (Counter-Piracy)
