= New Zealand Meritorious & Long Service Awards =

Prior to 1985 the New Zealand armed forces received the same Meritorious and Long Service Awards awarded in the United Kingdom. Since the end of World War 2 there have been constant moves towards an independent New Zealand honours system. This has resulted in a new system of New Zealand honours, gallantry and bravery awards, and campaign medals.

The following are a list, in order of precedence as defined in references below. Those Meritorious and Long Service medals which have been independently issued by New Zealand to its armed forces are in bold.

== Commemoration Medals ==
- **New Zealand 1990 Commemoration Medal** (for Sesquicentennial)
- **New Zealand Suffrage Centennial Medal 1993** (for Women's suffrage)

== Meritorious & Long Service Medals ==
- New Zealand Territorial Service Medal
- New Zealand Long and Efficient Service Medal
- **New Zealand Meritorious Service Medal**
- **New Zealand Defence Meritorious Service Medal**
- **New Zealand Police Meritorious Service Medal**
- **New Zealand Public Service Medal**
- **New Zealand Armed Forces Award**
- **New Zealand Army Long Service and Good Conduct Medal**
- **Royal New Zealand Navy Long Service and Good Conduct Medal**
- **Royal New Zealand Air Force Long Service and Good Conduct Medal**
- **New Zealand Police Long Service and Good Conduct Medal**
- **NZ Fire Brigades Long Service & Good Conduct Medal**
- New Zealand Prison Service Medal
- **New Zealand Traffic Service Medal**
- **New Zealand Customs Service Medal**
- Efficiency Decoration
- Efficiency Medal
- **RNZN Reserve Decoration**
- **RNZN Volunteer Reserve Decoration**
- **RNZN Volunteer Reserve Long Service & Good Conduct Medal**
- Air Efficiency Award
- Cadet Forces Medal
- **New Zealand Defence Service Medal**

== Other awards ==
- Queens Medal for Champion Shots (Army)
- Queens Medal for Champion Shots (Navy)
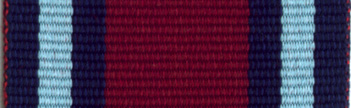
- Queens Medal for Champion Shots (Air Force)
