= Public Service Medal =

Public Service Medal may refer to one of a number of awards:

- New Zealand Public Service Medal, a New Zealand civil award
- Pingat Bakti Masyarakat (Public Service Medal), a Singaporean civil award
- Public Service Medal (Australia), an Australian civil award
- Public Service Medal (NASA), is an award given by NASA to civilians
