= Afghanistan Medal =

Afghanistan Medal may refer to:

- Afghanistan Medal (United Kingdom), British campaign medal for service 1878–1880
- Afghanistan Medal (Australia), Australian campaign medal for service 2001 onwards
- Afghanistan Campaign Medal, US campaign medal for service 2001 onwards
- Operational Service Medal for Afghanistan, UK campaign medal for service 2001 onwards
- New Zealand General Service Medal 2002 (Afghanistan), New Zealand campaign medal for service 2001 onwards
