= Iraq Medal =

Iraq Medal may refer to:

- Iraq Medal (Australia), Australian Defence Force campaign medal for service in Iraq, 2003–2013
- New Zealand General Service Medal 2002 (Iraq 2003), New Zealand Defence Force campaign medal for service in Iraq since 2003
- Iraq Medal (United Kingdom), British Forces campaign medal, for service 2003–2011
- Iraq Campaign Medal, United States armed forces military decoration, for service 2003–2011
