= Section officer =

Section officer may refer to:

- The equivalent rank to Flying officer in the British Women's Auxiliary Air Force
- The equivalent rank to Sergeant in some British Special Constabularies
