= Efficiency Decoration (disambiguation) =

Efficiency Decoration may refer to:

- Efficiency Decoration (Canada)
- Efficiency Decoration (New Zealand)
- Efficiency Decoration (South Africa)
- Efficiency Decoration (United Kingdom)
- Territorial Decoration.
