= New Zealand General Service Medal 2002 (Korea) =

New Zealand General Service Medal 2002 (Korea 2008)
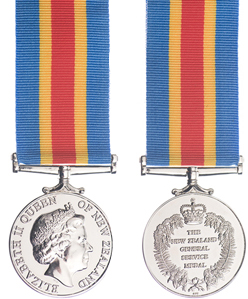
- Type: Campaign medal
- Awarded for: 30 days service with the United Nations in the Republic of Korea
- Description: Silver disk, 38mm diameter.
- Presented by: New Zealand
- Eligibility: New Zealand Defence Force
- Campaign(s): Korea 2001-present
- Clasps: None authorized
- Established: 2008

The New Zealand General Service Medal 2002 (Korea) is a New Zealand campaign medal for service in Korea. The New Zealand General Service Medal 2002 (NZGSM 2002) was established by royal warrant to recognize service since 2000. The NZGSM 2002 (Korea) was authorized by regulation on 5 September 2008. To qualify for this medal personnel must serve thirty days in the Republic of Korea with the United Nations Command Military Armistice Commission (UNCMAC) or the United Nations Command Honour Guard Company. Only service since 1 January 2001 qualifies. This medal replaces the award of the New Zealand General Service Medal 1992 (Non-Warlike) with the Korea 1958-2000 clasp.

== See also ==
- New Zealand campaign medals
