= Long Service and Good Conduct Medal (New Zealand) =

- Ribbon bar of the army medal Ribbon bar of the navy medal Ribbon bar of the air force medal
- Type: Medal for long service
- Awarded for: Fourteen years of unblemished service
- Presented by: New Zealand
- Eligibility: Regular Force non-commissioned officers and other ranks of the New Zealand Defence Force
- Clasps: For each additional 7 years of service
- Status: Currently awarded
- Established: 6 May 1985

Precedence
- Next (higher): New Zealand Armed Forces Award
- Next (lower): New Zealand Police Long Service and Good Conduct Medal

The Long Service and Good Conduct Medal is a military award recognizing 14 years of exemplary and unblemished service by non-commissioned and other ranks members of the New Zealand Defence Force. Established in 1985, these medals replaced the British Long Service and Good Conduct Medals with specific versions for New Zealand. There are three version of the Long Service and Good Conduct Medal, one each for the New Zealand Army, Royal New Zealand Navy, and the Royal New Zealand Air Force.

== Criteria ==
The Long Service and Good Conduct Medal may be awarded after 14 years of full-time service, or a combined 14 years of full-time service, in the Regular Force of the New Zealand Army, Royal New Zealand Navy, and Royal New Zealand Air Force. A subsequent award of the medal, based upon the completion of an additional 7 years of qualifying service, is denoted by a medal bar or a rosette worn on the service ribbon. During the period of qualifying service, only service members, "whose character and conduct have been irreproachable and who are recommended by their commanding officer." are eligible for the medal.

Service which may be counted towards the award of the medal or clasp, is classified as follows:

- Service in the Regular Force of the New Zealand Regular Army, Royal New Zealand Navy, or Regular Air Force of the Royal New Zealand or service in a regular and permanent force of a country of the Commonwealth of which the Queen is head of state, unless that service that has been recognised by the award of a long service award
- For those individuals appointed to a commission in the New Zealand Defence Force, the qualifying service for the medal is 15 years, with 12 of those years in service as a non-commissioned officer
- Those appointed to a commission in the Regular Forces of the New Zealand Defence Force who, before being appointed, have been awarded the Long Service and Good Conduct Medal of their service, the qualifying service for the award of a clasp shall be 15 years from the award of the medal. Of those 15 years, seven must have been in service as a non-commissioned officer
- Service that is not full-time in nature in a reserve, militia, territorial, volunteer, or auxiliary force or other force of New Zealand or of any other country of the Commonwealth of which the Queen is head of state, does not count in the qualifying period of service for the medal. The exception to this is that the service in the force is required to be continuous service in an emergency and the member of the force actually serves full-time.

== Appearance ==
New Zealand Army

The New Zealand Army Long Service and Good Conduct Medal is circular in shape, made of silver. The obverse bears the crowned effigy of the Sovereign, surrounded by the inscription Elizabeth II Dei Gratia Regina F.D. The reverse is plain with the inscription in four lines For Long Service and Good Conduct. The medal is suspended from a crimson ribbon edged in white, 32 mm in width. The medal attaches to the ribbon by an ornamental title bar bearing the words New Zealand in relief.

Royal New Zealand Navy

The Royal New Zealand Navy Long Service and Good Conduct Medal is circular in shape, made of silver. The obverse of the medal bears the young uncrowned effigy of the Sovereign, surrounded by the inscription Elizabeth·II·Dei·Gratia·Regina·F:D: The reverse bears a representation of HMS Victory, encircled by a rope, joined at the bottom in a Reef knot. It is surrounded by the inscription For Long Service and Good Conduct. The medal is suspended from a blue ribbon edged in white, 32 mm in width. The medal attaches to the ribbon by a straight hang bar.

Royal New Zealand Air Force

The Royal New Zealand Air Force Long Service and Good Conduct Medal is circular in shape, made of silver. The obverse of the medal bears the young uncrowned effigy of the Sovereign, surrounded by the inscription Elizabeth·II·Dei·Gratia·Regina·F:D: The reverse depicts a stylized eagle in flight with spread wings, surmounted by the tudor crown. Surrounding the eagle is the inscription For Long Service and Good Conduct. The medal is suspended from a ribbon of equal stripes of blue and red, edged in white, 32 mm in width. The medal attaches to the ribbon by a curved ornamented bar.

== See also ==
- Long Service and Good Conduct Medal
- Long Service and Good Conduct Medal (South Africa)
- New Zealand Honours Order of Precedence
- New Zealand Meritorious & Long Service Awards
- Permanent Overseas Forces Long Service and Good Conduct Medal
