= H.M. Coastguard Long Service and Good Conduct Medal =

British long service award

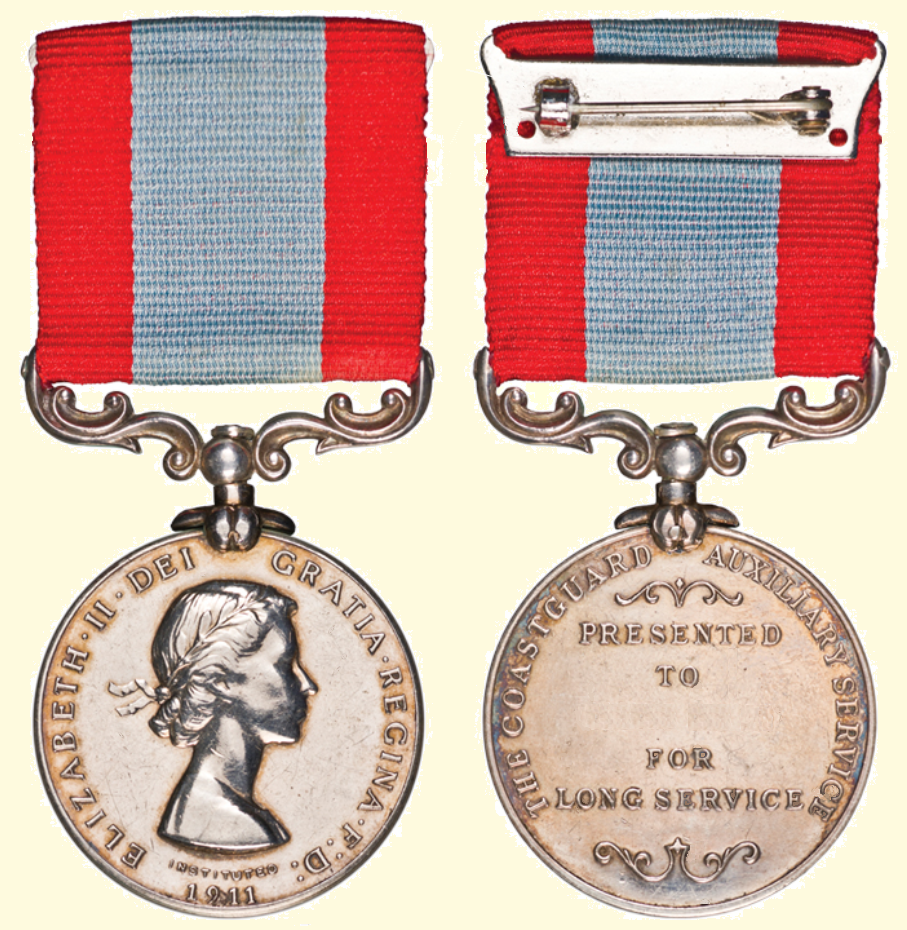
- Version, inscribed 'The Coastguard Auxiliary Service', awarded 1997–2012
- Type: Long service medal
- Awarded for: 20 years full or part-time service with a clasp for each subsequent period of 10 years service
- Presented by: United Kingdom
- Eligibility: Members of His Majesty's Coastguard, Coastguard Rescue Service, Isle of Man Coastguard and auxiliary coastguards.
- 1911–2012 ribbon Ribbon since 2012

Order of Wear
- Next (higher): Cadet Forces Medal
- Next (lower): Special Constabulary Long Service Medal

H.M. Coastguard Long Service and Good Conduct Medal is a long service medal awarded by the United Kingdom. Awarded for twenty years full or part-time service, with members of His Majesty's Coastguard, Coastguard Rescue Service, Isle of Man Coastguard and auxiliary coastguards eligible.

== History ==
Established in 1911 by the Board of Trade, the medal was initially known as the Board of Trade Rocket Apparatus Long Service Medal, first appearing in the order of wear in 1922. The medal was awarded for service with a rocket life-saving apparatus company or brigade, upon the recommendation of the Board of Trade (until 1941), the Minister of Shipping (1941–42), Minister of War Transport (1942–46), and Minister of Transport (from 1946). In 1954, the name of the medal changed to the Coast Life Saving Corps Long Service Medal, and again in 1997 to the Coastguard Auxiliary Long Service Medal. Finally, in 2012 the medal came to be known by its current name H.M. Coastguard Long Service and Good Conduct Medal.

== Appearance ==
H.M. Coastguard Long Service and Good Conduct Medal is a silver circular medal. The obverse bears the effigy of the sovereign surrounded by their royal titles. Below the effigy are the words Instituted 1911. Since 2012 the reverse has the inscription Presented to, with a space for engraving the recipient's name, and for long service and good conduct with H. M. Coastguard. The precise wording on the reverse of earlier versions varied to reflect the then title of the organisation and the administering Government Department.

A clasp inscribed with the words Long Service is awarded on completion of further periods of ten years service after the award of the medal. When the ribbon bar alone is worn, a silver rosette is worn for each bar received.

The medal has used two different ribbons with the same colours, both 1.25 inches (32 mm) wide. The current ribbon is red with one central sky blue stripe and two narrow sky blue stripes. Prior to 2012, the ribbon was red with a broad centre stripe of sky blue.
