= List of British special constables awarded honours =

Medal ribbon bar of the Order of the British Empire Medal

Medal ribbon bar of the King's Police Medal

The honours awarded by His Majesty, The King are published in the official Crown newspaper, the London Gazette, twice a year – at New Year, and in mid-June on the date of the King's official birthday, once per year as a special supplement for the King's Award for Voluntary Service on 14 November, and within various other Special Supplements for miscellaneous awards, honours and achievements.

There have been numerous awards of honours to members of the Special Constabulary across the United Kingdom of Great Britain and Northern Ireland, including individuals of all ranks, and team awards. These include the following:

- OBE – Officer of the Order of the British Empire
- MBE – Member of the Order of the British Empire
- BEM – British Empire Medal
- KPM – King's Police Medal
- KAVS – King's Award for Voluntary Service

All of the honours listed above, apart from the King's Award for Voluntary Service, allow for the use of the abbreviated post-nominal letters after the individual's name. Special Constables are also eligible for the Special Constabulary Long Service Medal after 9 years service as a volunteer Police Officer.

== Honours Recipients ==
=== Officer of the Order of the British Empire (OBE) ===
Rank	Name	Force	Awarded	Date
Chief Officer	Gavin Marcus McKinnon	Kent Police	King's Birthday Honours	17 June 2023
Chief Officer	John Bernard Barradell	Metropolitan Police Service	New Year Honours	1 January 2008
Chief Officer	Peter Lyn Howells	Gwent Police	Queen's Birthday Honours	11 June 2005

=== Member of the Order of the British Empire (MBE) ===
Rank	Name	Force	Awarded	Date
Chief Officer	Craig Batham	South Yorkshire Police	King's Birthday Honours	14 June 2024
Chief Officer	Darren Taylor	Norfolk Constabulary	Queen's Birthday Honours	11 June 2021
Chief Officer	Katherine Hancock	Warwickshire Police	New Year Honours	1 January 2021
Chief Officer	Mark Owen	North Wales Police	New Year Honours	1 January 2021
Special Constable	Alan Marwood	Nottinghamshire Police	Queen's Birthday Honours	10 October 2020
Special Inspector	Madeleine Clements	South Wales Police	Queen's Birthday Honours	10 October 2020
Chief Officer	Michael Walmsley	Greater Manchester Police	New Year Honours	1 January 2020
Special Chief Inspector	Derek Alan May	Kent Police	New Year Honours	1 January 2019
Special Sergeant	Robert Victor Harrild	Metropolitan Police Service	New Year Honours	1 January 2017
Special Chief Inspector	Raymond William Lumley	Norfolk Constabulary	New Year Honours	1 January 2017
Special Constable	Richard Fredrick Warren	Wiltshire Police	Queen's Birthday Honours	10 June 2016
Chief Officer	Debi Potter	Dorset Police	Queen's Birthday Honours	13 June 2015
Assistant Chief Officer	Derek Hopkins	Essex Police	New Year Honours	1 January 2015
Special Constable	Paul Harrison	Metropolitan Police Service	New Year Honours	1 January 2015
Special Superintendent	Alistair Borland	Thames Valley Police	Queen's Birthday Honours	14 June 2014
Special Constable	John Giles	Metropolitan Police Service	Queen's Birthday Honours	14 June 2014
Area Officer	Trevor Spence	Lancashire Constabulary	Queen's Birthday Honours	14 June 2013
Special Constable	Alistair Iain McFadyen	West Yorkshire Police	New Year Honours	1 January 2014
Special Inspector	Patrick Otto Rarden	City of London Police	New Year Honours	1 January 2014
Special Constable	Simon Paul Bale	Avon and Somerset Constabulary	Queen's Birthday Honours	14 June 2013
Area Officer	Brian William Hewlett	Gloucestershire Constabulary	Queen's Birthday Honours	14 June 2013
Special Constable	Martin John Hovenden	Sussex Constabulary	New Year Honours	1 January 2013
District Officer	Richard John Ashwin Owen	Hampshire Constabulary	New Year Honours	1 January 2013
Special Constable	John Michael Tupman	Wiltshire Police	New Year Honours	1 January 2013
Chief Officer	Alan William Paul Brown	Devon and Cornwall Constabulary	Queen's Birthday Honours	16 June 2012
Chief Officer	Glyn Gardner	Warwickshire Constabulary	Queen's Birthday Honours	16 June 2012
Special Sergeant	Brian Rodney Hunter	Lincolnshire Police	Queen's Birthday Honours	16 June 2012
Special Constable	John Wood	Avon and Somerset Constabulary	Queen's Birthday Honours	16 June 2012
Chief Officer	Mrs Beryl Lynn Hodgson	Hampshire Constabulary	New Year Honours	1 January 2012
Special Inspector	Peter William Kellett	Lancashire Constabulary	New Year Honours	1 January 2012
Special Sergeant	Gurcharan Singh Dhesi	Metropolitan Police Service	Queen's Birthday Honours	11 June 2011
Assistant Divisional Officer	Stephen Lindsay	Gloucestershire Constabulary	New Year Honours	1 January 2011
Chief Officer	Malcolm David Pearson	Norfolk Constabulary	New Year Honours	1 January 2011
Assistant Chief Officer	Miss Patricia Ann Holdsworth	Metropolitan Police Service	Queen's Birthday Honours	12 June 2010
Special Chief Inspector	Mrs Brenda Roscoe	Greater Manchester Police	Queen's Birthday Honours	12 June 2010
Special Constable	Miss Ann Sevier	Hampshire Constabulary	Queen's Birthday Honours	12 June 2010
Special Constable	Anthony John Alderman	Avon and Somerset Constabulary	New Year Honours	1 January 2010
Special Constable	Warner James Baker	Hampshire Constabulary	New Year Honours	1 January 2010
Divisional Officer	Mrs Carol Ann Downes	Derbyshire Constabulary	New Year Honours	1 January 2010
Special Constable	Jacqueline Lesley Connor	Sussex Constabulary	Queen's Birthday Honours	13 June 2009
Special Constable	Mrs Pamela Mary Becke	West Mercia Police	New Year Honours	1 January 2009
Special Constable	Keith Brough	Lothian and Borders Police	New Year Honours	1 January 2009
Chief Officer	Nigel Francis Green	Bedfordshire Police	New Year Honours	1 January 2009
Special Constable	Graham Arthur Smout	Staffordshire Police	New Year Honours	1 January 2009
Special Sergeant	Simon Winters	Hertfordshire Constabulary	Queen's Birthday Honours	13 June 2009
Special Constable	Maurice Duckworth	Lancashire Constabulary	Queen's Birthday Honours	13 June 2009
Chief Officer	Geoffrey Charles Knupfer	Durham Constabulary	Queen's Birthday Honours	13 June 2009
Commandant	Ian Kenneth Miller	City of London Police	Queen's Birthday Honours	13 June 2008
Chief Officer	Satbir Singh Giany	Hampshire Constabulary	Queen's Birthday Honours	13 June 2008
Special Constable	Mrs Nichola Kirkham	South Yorkshire Police	New Year Honours	1 January 2008
Chief Commandant	Susan Bowes-Evans	South Wales Police	New Year Honours	30 December 2006
Special Constable	Ian Michael Parks	Durham Constabulary	New Year Honours	1 January 2006
Chief Officer	Michael John Hedges	Norfolk Constabulary	Queen's Birthday Honours	11 June 2005
Divisional Officer	Mrs Janet Riley	Staffordshire Police	Queen's Birthday Honours	11 June 2005
Divisional Commandant	Francis Raymond Walster	Humberside Constabulary	Queen's Birthday Honours	11 June 2005
Special Constable	George Kenneth Want	Warwickshire Constabulary	Queen's Birthday Honours	11 June 2005
District Officer	Mrs Margaret Wilkin	South Yorkshire Police	New Year Honours	1 January 2005
Sector Officer	Michael William Robinson	Suffolk Constabulary	Queen's Birthday Honours	12 June 2004
Area Officer	George Frank Haynes	Warwickshire Constabulary	New Year Honours	1 January 2000
Special Constable	Douglas Scott McKay	Lothian and Borders Police	New Year Honours	1 January 2000

=== British Empire Medal (BEM) ===
Rank	Name	Force	Awarded	Date
Special Inspector	Ryan Paul Clarke	Nottinghamshire Police	King's Birthday Honours	14 June 2025
Special Inspector	Christopher Jamieson	British Transport Police	New Year Honours	30 December 2023
Special Inspector	Robert Lewis	South Wales Police	King's Birthday Honours	17 June 2023
Special Chief Officer	Sharron Moverley-Holmes	North Yorkshire Police	Queen's Birthday Honours	2 June 2022
Special Constable	Michael Scott	Northumbria Police	Queen's Birthday Honours	2 June 2022
Special Constable	Jonathan Gray	Northumbria Police	Queen's Birthday Honours	2 June 2022
Special Superintendent	Sudath Leon Dias	Essex Police	Queen's Birthday Honours	2 June 2022
Special Constable	Rod Munro	Lincolnshire Police	Queen’s Birthday Honours	1 January 2022
Chief Officer	Kenneth Iredale	Surrey Police	Queen's Birthday Honours	12 June 2021
Special Constable	Robert Davies	South Wales Police	New Year Honours	1 January 2021
Special Constable	Graham Wilson	Police Service of Scotland	Queen's Birthday Honours	10 October 2020
Chief Officer	Cairn Frederick Newton-Evans	Dyfed-Powys Police	New Year Honours	1 January 2019
Special Superintendent	Howard Rayner	Essex Police	New Year Honours	1 January 2019
Special Inspector	Kenneth Avery	Hampshire Constabulary	New Year Honours	1 January 2019
Special Sergeant	Jared Simpson	Greater Manchester Police	New Year Honours	1 January 2019
Special Sergeant	Charles Pearson	West Mercia Constabulary	New Year Honours	1 January 2019
Special Sergeant	Alan Smith	British Transport Police	New Year Honours	1 January 2019
Chief Officer	Benjamin Clifford	British Transport Police	Queen's Birthday Honours	8 June 2018
Special Constable	Russ Hall	Devon & Cornwall Police	Queen’s Birthday Honours	8 June 2018
Special Constable	David Slack	Kent Police	Queen's Birthday Honours	8 June 2018
Special Constable	Lloyd Bartle Fairey	Northamptonshire Police	New Year Honours	1 January 2018
Special Chief Inspector	Steven Barry Greenwood	British Transport Police	Queen's Birthday Honours	16 June 2017
Special Constable	Brian Edward Murphy	Cumbria Constabulary	Queen's Birthday Honours	16 June 2017
Special Sergeant	Mark Walder	British Transport Police	New Year Honours	1 January 2017
Special Constable	(Frank) Linden Riley	Greater Manchester Police	Queen's Birthday Honours	13 June 2015
Chief Officer	David Robinson	Cleveland Police	New Year Honours	1 January 2015
Special Constable	John Ayers	Metropolitan Police	New Year Honours	1 January 2015
Special Constable	Kevin Derrick Lee	Staffordshire Police	Queen's Birthday Honours	14 June 2014
	Michael David Roberts	Cumbria Constabulary	New Year Honours	1 January 2014
Area Officer	David Clifford John Kingsnorth	Suffolk Constabulary	Queen's Birthday Honours	14 June 2013
Divisional Commandant	Raymond May	Greater Manchester Police	New Year Honours	1 January 1992

=== King's (formerly Queen's) Police Medal ===
Special Constables in England and Wales are now eligible to receive the King's Police Medal. On 11 March 2022 Queen Elizabeth II approved amendments to the Royal Warrant to expressly state that members of the Special Constabulary in England and Wales were eligible for the medal. As members of a police force, Special Constables in Scotland were already eligible.

Rank	Name	Force	Awarded	Date
Special Constable	Alistair Cameron	Police Service of Scotland	Birthday Honours	15 June 2024
Special Sergeant	Niyi Opaleye	Kent Police	Birthday Honours	15 June 2024
Special Chief Inspector	Laura Hart	Merseyside Police	New Year Honours	30 December 2023
Special Constable	Andrew Gillies	Police Scotland	Queen's Birthday Honours	13 June 2015
Special Constable	Marshall Moyes	Police Scotland	New Year Honours	1 January 2015
Special Constable	Hugh Duncan	Grampian Police	New Year Honours	1 January 2012
Special Constable	Frank Buchan	Tayside Police	Queen's Birthday Honours	12 June 2010
Special Constable	Robert Ballantyne	Grampian Police	Queen's Birthday Honours	13 June 2008

=== King's (formerly Queen's) Award for Voluntary Service ===
The King's Award for Voluntary Service (KAVS) is the highest award given to volunteer groups across the UK, and is equivalent to a collective MBE. The majority of the group must be volunteers.

Winners are given a certificate signed by HM The King and a domed crystal trophy.

Special Constabularies awarded the QAVS
Force	Date
South Wales Police – Special Constabulary	2 June 2021
Greater Manchester Police – Special Constabulary	2 June 2018
Kent Special Constabulary - Kent Police	2 June 2014
