= Queen Elizabeth II Golden Jubilee Medal =

- Obverse and reverse (Canadian version)
- Type: Medal
- Awarded for: Having made an honourable service in military, police, prison, and emergency forces, or for outstanding achievement or public service in Canada or for five years or more qualifying service in the British Armed Forces
- Presented by: The monarch of Australia, Canada, and the United Kingdom
- Eligibility: British and Canadian citizens alive on 6 February 2002
- Status: No longer awarded

Highlights
- Total: 6 (Australia); 46,000 (Canada); Nearly 400,000 (United Kingdom)
- Ribbon bar

Precedence
- Next (higher): Dependent on state
- Equivalent: Dependent on state
- Next (lower): Dependent on state
- Related: Coronation Medal, Silver Jubilee Medal, Diamond Jubilee Medal, Platinum Jubilee Medal

The Queen Elizabeth II Golden Jubilee Medal (French: Médaille du jubilé d'or de la Reine Elizabeth II) or the Queen's Golden Jubilee Medal was a commemorative medal created in 2002 to mark the 50th anniversary of Queen Elizabeth II's accession in 1952. The Queen Elizabeth II Golden Jubilee Medal was awarded in Canada to nominees who contributed to public life. The Queen's Golden Jubilee Medal was awarded to active personnel in the British Armed Forces and emergency personnel who had completed five years of qualifying service.

== Design ==
The Canadian and British medals were of different designs.

Canada: The medal is gold-plated, bronze medal with a thin raised edge and, on the obverse, an effigy of Queen Elizabeth II, crowned with the George IV State Diadem and circumscribed by the words QUEEN OF CANADA • REINE DU CANADA. The reverse features a stylised maple leaf with CANADA at the bottom and the years 1952 and 2002 on the left and right of the Royal cypher and crown.

United Kingdom's version of the Queen's Golden Jubilee Medal

United Kingdom: The medal is of cupronickel with a gilt finish and shows the Queen wearing St. Edward's Crown, circumscribed by the inscription ELIZABETH • II • DEI • GRA • REGINA • FID • DEF; on the reverse is the shield of Royal coat of arms of the United Kingdom flanked by the years 1952 and 2002.

Both medals were issued unnamed, and are suspended from the same broad royal blue ribbon with red outer stripes and, at the centre, double white stripes with a red stripe between.

== Eligibility and allocation ==
In Canada, the medal was administered by the Chancellery of Honours at Rideau Hall and was awarded to Canadians who made a significant contribution to their fellow citizens, their community, or to Canada over the previous fifty years. Various organisations were invited to propose the names of candidates for the medal; this included all levels of Canadian government, educational and cultural organisations, the Canadian Forces, the Royal Canadian Mounted Police, veterans' groups, sports associations, and philanthropic and charitable bodies. Of the 46,000 medals issued, approximately 9,600 medals were awarded to members of the Canadian Forces according to a system that distributed them proportionately by service (navy, army, air force), rank, and years of service, occupations, and regular force and reservists, including Rangers and honorary appointees.

Members of the British Armed Forces regular, reserve, and cadet branches, serving prison officers and members of the police and emergency services who were enrolled as of Accession Day and had been so for five years were given the medal in the United Kingdom. 94,222 members of the Army received the medal, as did 32,273 in the Royal Navy and Royal Marines, and 38,889 in the Royal Air Force. Longer serving members of the Royal Household and living holders of the Victoria Cross and the George Cross also received the medal.

== Precedence ==
Some orders of precedence are as follows:

Country	Preceding	Following
(Australia) Australia; Order of precedence	Queen Elizabeth II Silver Jubilee Medal	Queen Elizabeth II Diamond Jubilee Medal
(Canada) Canada; Order of precedence	125th Anniversary of the Confederation of Canada Medal	Queen Elizabeth II Diamond Jubilee Medal
(New Zealand) New Zealand; Order of precedence	Queen Elizabeth II Silver Jubilee Medal	Queen Elizabeth II Diamond Jubilee Medal
(United Kingdom) United Kingdom; Order of precedence	Queen Elizabeth II Silver Jubilee Medal	Queen Elizabeth II Diamond Jubilee Medal

The medal was not awarded by New Zealand. However, it was accorded a place in the country's order of wear to accommodate British citizens who had received the medal in the UK and subsequently joined the New Zealand Defence Force.

== See also ==
- Queen Elizabeth II Coronation Medal
- Queen Elizabeth II Silver Jubilee Medal
- Queen Elizabeth II Diamond Jubilee Medal
- Queen Elizabeth II Platinum Jubilee Medal
