= New Zealand General Service Medal 1992 (Warlike) =

- Obverse (top left) and reverse (top right) of the medal. Ribbon: 32mm, dark blue with a central black stripe flanked by red stripes.
- Type: Campaign medal
- Awarded for: Campaign service.
- Description: Silver disk, 38mm diameter.
- Presented by: New Zealand
- Eligibility: New Zealand forces.
- Campaign(s): Warlike operations 1956-91.
- Clasps: Near East; Malaya 1960-64; Vietnam; Kuwait
- Established: 1992

The New Zealand General Service Medal 1992 (Warlike) (NZGSM 1992) is a New Zealand campaign medal, authorised in 1992, for award to New Zealanders who have served in warlike operations for which no separate New Zealand or British Commonwealth campaign medal was issued.

Each operation covered by the medal was represented by a clasp on the ribbon; by the time it was replaced in 2002, four clasps had been issued, covering operations between 1956 and 1991. The medal was never issued without a clasp.

The NZGSM 1992 was issued in two varieties - one for warlike service, and another for non-warlike service. Warlike operations were commemorated by this medal, humanitarian and peacekeeping operations were commemorated by the NZGSM 1992 (Non-Warlike) in bronze.

The design and colours of the ribbon were based upon the New Zealand Medal of 1869, thus are directly linked with the beginnings of New Zealand’s military history. As the first occasion upon which New Zealand had issued a war or warlike service medal outside of the two World Wars or the Vietnam War it was considered that the link with the first military campaigns in New Zealand best reflected New Zealand’s military heritage.

This medal was replaced in 2002 by the New Zealand General Service Medal 2002.

== Clasps ==
- Near East

31 October - 22 December 1956. Awarded to members of the Royal New Zealand Navy who served for 1 day or more in ships engaged in operations off the Egyptian coast between these dates and who did not qualify for the award of the Naval General Service Medal (1915) with the clasp Near East.

- Malaya 1960-64

1 August 1960 - 16 August 1964. Awarded to members of the New Zealand armed forces who:
- served 1 day in the operational area on the posted strength of a unit conducting operations;
- conducted one sortie as a member of aircrew conducting operations in the operational area;
- served for 30 days or more (consecutive or aggregate) in the operational area for official visits, inspections, or other occurrences of a temporary nature on duty.
The operational area encompassed those areas of Perlis, Kedah, Perak, and Kelantan, provinces in the Federation of Malaya, where members of the New Zealand Army, the Royal New Zealand Navy, or the Royal New Zealand Air Force were deployed on active service.

- Vietnam

1 December 1962 - 1 May 1975. Awarded to members of the New Zealand armed forces who served for 1 day on operations (or, in the case of aircrew, flew one operational sortie) within the political boundaries and territorial waters of Vietnam.

The clasp was also awarded, after 30 days service (consecutive or aggregate), to civilians and service personnel not participating in operations who:
- served with New Zealand or allied armed forces; or
- worked on New Zealand government duties; or
- rendered humanitarian service on behalf of organisations supported or sanctioned by the New Zealand government; or
- served as war correspondents,
within the political boundaries and territorial waters of Vietnam.

Service terminated by death or wounds, or the award of a decoration for gallantry led to the immediate award of the medal, regardless of whether the qualification period had been fulfilled. Personnel whose service was completed between 1 December 1962 and 27 Jan 1973 and whose service had been recognised by grant of the Vietnam Medal were ineligible for the award of this clasp.

- Kuwait

18 December 1990 - 12 March 1991. Awarded to members of the New Zealand armed forces who:
- served 1 day in the operational area on the posted strength of:

- 1st New Zealand Army Medical Team; or
- 40 Squadron Detachment Multi-National force; or
- The New Zealand Defence Force Medical Contingent.

- served, in the capacity of a member of the New Zealand armed forces, for 30 days or more (consecutive or aggregate) in the operational area for official visits, inspections, or other occurrences of a temporary nature on duty.
The operational area encompassed, on land, Saudi Arabia, Oman, the United Arab Emirates, Qatar, Kuwait, Iraq, and Bahrain. The operational area further included the Gulf of Suez, the Gulf of Aqaba, the Red Sea, the Gulf of Aden, the Persian Gulf, the Gulf of Oman, the North Arabian Sea.

== Bibliography ==
- Mackay, J and Mussel, J (eds)- Medals Yearbook – 2005, (2004), Token Publishing.
