= New Zealand Special Service Medal =

- Obverse and reverse of the medal
- Type: Service medal
- Country: New Zealand
- Eligibility: Special services under regulations that the governor-general of New Zealand, acting on the advice of the prime minister or a minister of the Crown acting for the prime minister, may determine
- Status: Currently awarded
- New Zealand Special Service Medal (Nuclear Testing) ribbon bar New Zealand Special Service Medal (Asian Tsunami) ribbon bar New Zealand Special Service Medal (Erebus) ribbon bar

Precedence
- Next (higher): New Zealand campaign medals (in order of award)
- Next (lower): Polar Medal

The New Zealand Special Service Medal (NZSSM) was established by royal warrant by Elizabeth II, Queen of New Zealand, on 23 July 2002. The medal serves to recognise military service that would not otherwise be recognised by a Campaign medal.

== Description ==
The circular medal is made of gold-plated base-metal. The obverse depicts the New Zealand Coat of Arms. The reverse, depicts a bouquet of flowers native to New Zealand. This bouquet has fern fronds and flowers of the pōhutukawa, mānuka, kōwhai, and Mount Cook lily. Across the base of the bouquet is a scroll bearing the words "FOR SPECIAL SERVICE". This design is shared by all three medals.

The medal is suspended from a ribbon is 32 millimetres (1.3 in) wide. The ribbon design varies based on the conditions under which the medal is awarded.

== Criteria ==
=== New Zealand Special Service Medal (Nuclear Testing) ===
The NZSSM (Nuclear Testing) is a retrospective award, established 24 July 2002, presented to personnel who were part of a New Zealand Government presence at atmospheric nuclear tests in the 1950s and one in 1973. The tests recognised by this medal were at:

- Maralinga, South Australia, on 27 September, 4 October, and 22 October 1956, and 25 September 1957
- Malden Island, on 15 May, 31 May, and 19 June 1957
- Christmas Island, on 8 November 1957, 28 April, 22 August, 2 September, 11 September, or 23 September 1958
- Nevada Test Site, on 1 September 1957
- Enewetak Atoll, on 18 July 1958
- Moruroa, on 22 July, and 28 July 1973 when the frigates, HMNZS Canterbury and Otago were sent to observe French nuclear testing

The ribbon of this medal has black, white, red and crimson stripes at the left side with an orange centre stripe and crimson, red, white and black stripes at the right side.

=== New Zealand Special Service Medal (Asian Tsunami) ===
The NZSSM (Asian Tsunami) was established on 22 December 2005 to recognise service in the aftermath of the 2004 Indian Ocean earthquake and tsunami. It recognises a minimum of seven days service from 26 December 2004 to 28 February 2005, or a minimum of 14 days from 26 December 2004 to 26 December 2005. Qualifying service is relief, recovery and reconstruction in affected countries. Countries affected where New Zealand citizens served were Bangladesh, India, Indonesia, Kenya, Madagascar, Malaysia, Maldives, Mauritius, Myanmar, Seychelles, Somalia, Sri Lanka, Tanzania and Thailand.

The ribbon of this medal has eleven vertical stripes of equal width in of red, white, blue, orange, green, yellow, green, orange, blue, white, and red. These colours are representative of the national flags of the countries affected by the tsunami.

=== New Zealand Special Service Medal (Erebus) ===
The NZSSM (Erebus) was established November 2006 to recognise service in the aftermath of the crash of Air New Zealand Flight 901 on Mount Erebus, Ross Island, Antarctica on 28 November 1979. Qualifying service includes body recovery, crash investigation and victim identification. Service was performed at the crash site; during support and supply flights in and out of the crash site; at McMurdo Station; or the mortuary at Auckland University School of Medicine.

The ribbon of the medal is seven vertical stripes in dark blue, light blue, white, black, white, light blue, and dark blue.

== See also ==
- New Zealand Honours Order of Precedence
