= New Zealand Prison Service Medal =

- Ribbon bar of the medal
- Type: Long and meritorious service
- Awarded for: Fourteen years of long and meritorious service in a custodial or supervisory capacity
- Presented by: New Zealand
- Eligibility: Full-time members of the New Zealand Prison Service (Department of Corrections)
- Status: Currently awarded
- Established: 15 October 1981

Precedence
- Next (higher): New Zealand Fire Brigades Long Service and Good Conduct Medal
- Next (lower): New Zealand Traffic Service Medal

The New Zealand Prison Service Medal is a meritorious and long service award for custodial and supervisory employees of the Department of Corrections who have completed 14 years of service.

== Criteria ==
The eponymous secondary legislation states that New Zealand Prison Service Medal may be awarded to any full-time member of the New Zealand Prison Service who has completed a total of 14 years' continuous service, in a custodial or supervisory capacity, and whose character and conduct is, in the opinion of the Secretary for Justice, of such good standard to warrant the medal.

== Appearance ==
The medal is silver and circular in shape. On the obverse is a crowned effigy of the Sovereign. The reverse bears a St Edward's Crown, surrounded by the inscription "New Zealand Prison Service—For Long Service and Good Conduct”. The medal hangs from a 32-millimetre ribbon of crimson, with narrow stripes of green, blue and green in the centre.
