= Special Constabulary =

British auxiliary police force

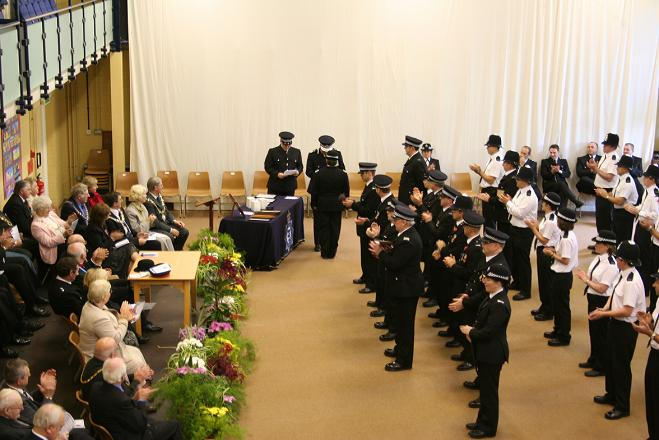
Special constables and regular officers of the Avon and Somerset Constabulary at the 175th anniversary of the Special Constabulary in Taunton, Somerset

The Special Constabulary is the part-time volunteer section of statutory police forces in the United Kingdom and some Crown dependencies. Its officers are known as special constables.

Every United Kingdom territorial police force has a special constabulary except the Police Service of Northern Ireland, which has a Reserve constituted on different grounds. However, the Royal Ulster Constabulary (and the previous Royal Irish Constabulary) did have its own Ulster Special Constabulary from 1920 until 1970, when the Reserve was formed. The British Transport Police (a national "special police force") also has a special constabulary. In the Crown dependencies, the Isle of Man Constabulary and the States of Guernsey Police Service also have special constabularies, but the States of Jersey Police does not. Jersey has Honorary Police.

As of 31 March 2026, there were 5,196 special constables belonging to territorial police forces in England and Wales. The number of special constables in Scotland in 2018 was 610.

Special constables are not the same as police community support officers (PCSOs), who are employed by police forces to provide operational support to regular officers. Special constables usually work for a minimum number of hours per month (depending on the force – the national minimum is 16 hours), although many do considerably more. Special constables might receive some expenses and allowances from the police service, including a £1,100 "recognition award" in Scotland and some forces in England, but their work is in the main voluntary and unpaid.

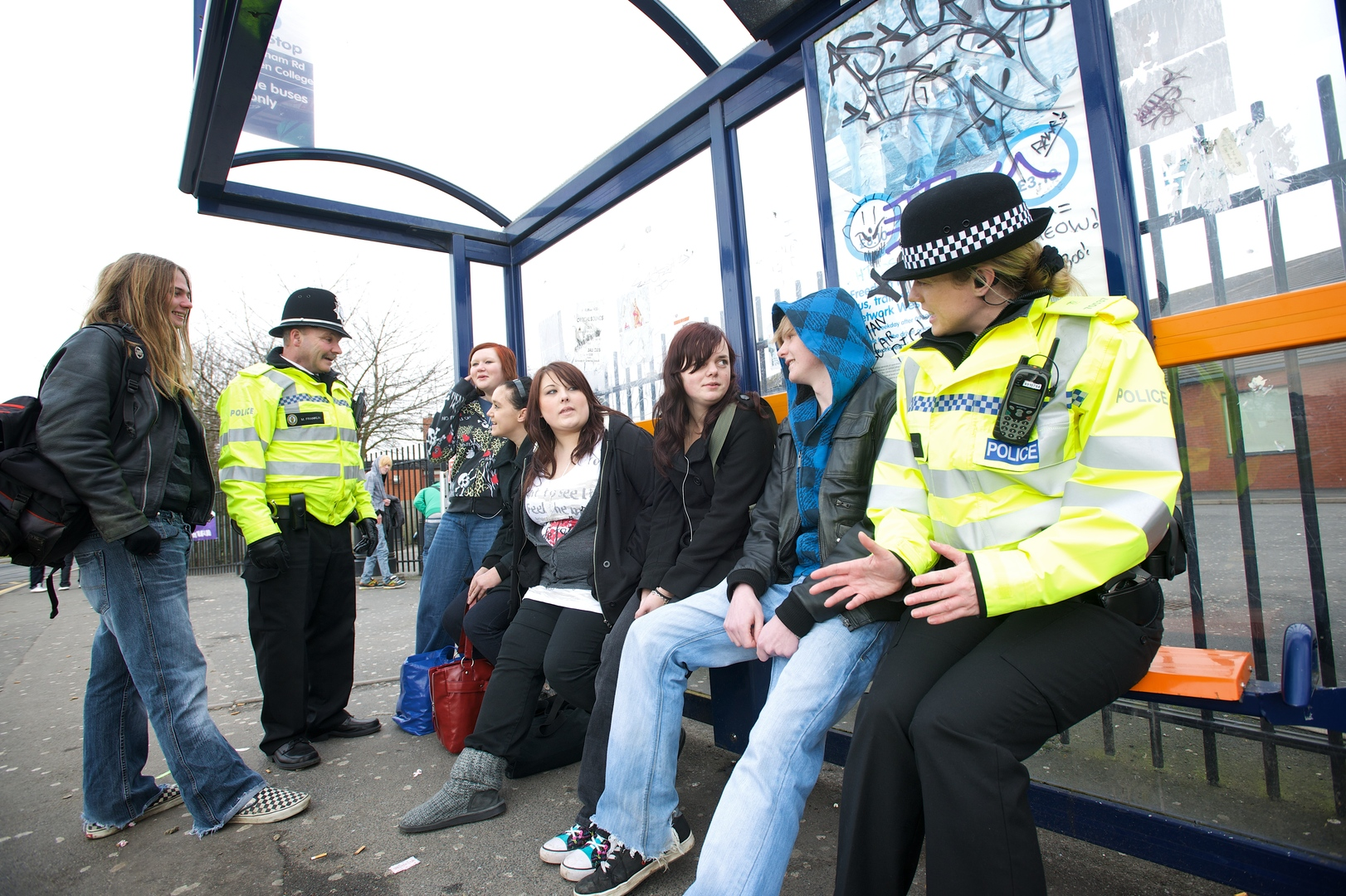
Dudley borough special constables on patrol, in 2010, near open spaces close to Halesowen College. Note the identical uniform to regular police constables (including headgear).

Special constables have identical powers to their regular (full-time) colleagues and work alongside them, but most special constabularies in England and Wales have their own organisational structure and grading system, which varies from force to force. Special constabularies are headed by a chief officer. In Scotland, special constables have no separate administrative structure and grading system.

== History ==
While the idea of a populace policing itself dates back to Anglo-Saxon times, with the Statute of Winchester requiring that all citizens have the legal obligation to come to the assistance of a police officer. The Poor Relief Act 1662 (14 Cha. 2. c. 12) was the first legislation to cover the concept of special constables, permitting magistrates to appoint temporary constables.

In 1819, mass meetings calling for parliamentary reform took place across England, including 60,000 demonstrators rioting in Manchester where a special constable was killed. In light of these events, the Appointment of Special Constables Act 1820 (1 Geo. 4. c. 37) was passed allowing magistrates to recruit men as special constables, a term it used to replace the earlier 'temporary constables'.

Parliament passed the Special Constables Act 1831 (1 & 2 Will. 4. c. 41), which forms the basis of special-constable principles to the modern day, and in particular allowed the formation of special constables outside of times of unrest, if the regular police force was deemed to be too small in a particular area. Specials were also granted full powers of arrest like their regular counterparts at this time, as well as weapons and equipment to carry out their duty.

The Special Constables Act 1835 (5 & 6 Will. 4. c. 43) redefined the Special Constabulary as a volunteer organisation, and expanded its jurisdiction. The constabulary was redefined for the last time into the organisation which exists today by the Special Constables Act 1914 (4 & 5 Geo. 5. c. 61) just after the outbreak of World War I, during which they safeguarded water supplies from German infiltrators. During the Second World War, besides their normal duties, they were trained to deal with a range of eventualities such as first aid in case of injury, initial coordination of the security of aircraft crash sites, clearing people from the vicinity of unexploded bombs, handling of unignited incendiary bombs and checking compliance with lighting regulations.

== Authority ==
Under Section 27 of the Police Act 1996, chief constables may appoint special constables for that police area:

The chief officer of police of the police force maintained for a police area may, in accordance with regulations under section 51, appoint special constables for that area....

Under Section 29 of the act, all special constables (and police constables) shall be attested as a constable, once appointed, by a justice of the peace:

Every member of a police force maintained for a police area and every special constable appointed for a police area shall, on appointment, be attested as a constable....

== Application ==
Requirements for being a special constable vary from force to force. The recruitment process in Scotland is also significantly different from the process in England and Wales. It can take from as few as six to as many as eighteen months from initial application through to attestation where recruits take the police oath. A number of different steps are involved in the recruitment process and the order can vary from force to force. The first part of the process usually involves completing an application form.

After that, there may be a combination of entrance test (the Police Initial Recruitment Test in England and Wales or the Standard Entrance Test in Scotland), interview, security checks, fitness test and medical assessment although the exact process is force specific.

== Ranks ==
There are currently a total of nine ranks currently in use across the special constabularies. Some of these ranks are rarely in use and special constabularies rarely use more than six ranks. The "NPIA" style rank insignia have a set of only seven ranks. There is no basis in law for ranks or grades for special constables. As such there is no equivalency of a regular police sergeant versus a special police sergeant for example. A special constable who is a higher rank or grade has no additional powers or opportunities in the same way as a regular officer. For example, a custody sergeant must be a regular police sergeant.

A special inspector cannot authorise a section 18(1) PACE search and so on. In an operational setting, a special constable whatever their rank or grade has no formal authority over a regular officer in terms of supervision, although occasionally a very experienced senior special officer may informally temporarily oversee inexperienced regular officers.

Special constabulary ranks
Styles	Officers						Chief officers		
"Bar" style ranks	Special constable	Special sergeant	Special inspector	Special chief inspector	Special superintendent	Special chief superintendent	Assistant chief officer	Deputy chief officer	Chief officer
"NPIA" style ranks	Special constable	Special sergeant	Special inspector	Special chief inspector	Special superintendent	No equivalent		Deputy chief officer	Chief officer

Only Cheshire Special Constabulary, Durham Special Constabulary and Cleveland Special Constabulary use the rank of special chief superintendent.

Within the City of London Special Constabulary is the Honourable Artillery Company Specials, provided by the Honourable Artillery Company; members of this unit wear HAC on the shoulders in addition to other insignia.

=== Insignia ===
There is a large variation in the design of epaulettes used across Great Britain for special constables. This has been recognised at national level and as part of the Special Constabulary National Strategy 2018-2023 the structure and insignia is under review with the intention to standardise.

Special constabulary epaulettes frequently bear the letters "SC" (with or without a crown above) to differentiate them from regular officers. Senior special constables wear the same markings on their hats as equivalent regular ranks.

Special constabularies using the NPIA approved rank insignia
Constabulary	Chief officer	Deputy chief officer	Special superintendent	Special chief inspector	Special inspector	Special sergeant	Special constable	Notes
Durham Special Constabulary								The special superintendent is not currently in use.
Hampshire Special Constabulary								Collar numbers begin with a 9
Kent Special Constabulary								The ranks of special constable and special sergeant feature the force emblems.
Merseyside Special Constabulary					NPIA Special inspector insignia			
Northamptonshire Special Constabulary								
South Wales Special Constabulary								South Wales Police issue special constabulary officers with the prefix of 7 for their collar numbers.
South Yorkshire Special Constabulary								
Wiltshire Special Constabulary								
Gloucestershire Special Constabulary								Proposed new insignia in 2019
City of London Special Constabulary								The Honourable Artillery Company special constables wear the letters HAC in addition.; The deputy chief officer of the special constabulary rank is named "special chief superintendent".; The chief officer of the special constabulary is named "special commander".
Notes	Blank spaces in the table indicate that a rank is not used in a force's structure.; This table of constabularies is not complete.							

Other special constabularies use combinations of bars, half bars, pips, crowns, laurel wreaths, collar numbers, force crests and the SC identity (with or without a crown) to distinguish ranks (and/or role).

Special constabularies using the alternative "bar style" rank insignia
Constabulary	Chief officer	Deputy chief officer	Assistant chief officer	Special chief superintendent	Special superintendent	Special chief inspector	Special inspector	Special sergeant	Special constable	Notes
Avon and Somerset Special Constabulary										
Bedfordshire Special Constabulary										
British Transport Police									Special constable rank insignia	
Cambridgeshire Special Constabulary										
Cheshire Special Constabulary										
Cleveland Special Constabulary										
Cumbria Special Constabulary										All special constable collar numbers start with a 6 or a 7; The deputy chief officer rank is currently vacant; The chief officer rank is currently vacant
Derbyshire Special Constabulary										
Devon and Cornwall Special Constabulary										
Dorset Special Constabulary										
Dyfed-Powys Special Constabulary										
Essex Special Constabulary										
Gloucestershire Special Constabulary										
Greater Manchester Special Constabulary										
Gwent Special Constabulary										
Hertfordshire Special Constabulary										
Lancashire Special Constabulary										Regular police sergeant acts as a chief officer
Leicestershire Special Constabulary										Special chief inspector acts as special constable lead
Lincolnshire Special Constabulary										
Metropolitan Special Constabulary										
Norfolk Special Constabulary										
Northumbria; Special; Constabulary										Northumbria Special Constabulary abolished its ranks in 2006. All officers hold the rank of special constable, although those who previously held a supervisory rank are entitled to continue wearing their rank insignia.
North Wales Special Constabulary										
Nottinghamshire Special Constabulary										
Police Scotland									Special constable rank insignia	Police Scotland do not currently have a rank structure for special constables.
Staffordshire Special Constabulary										
Suffolk Special Constabulary										
Surrey; Special; Constabulary										
Thames Valley Special Constabulary										Assistant chief officer is not currently in use
Warwickshire Special Constabulary						Special Chief Inspector Rank Insignia	Special Inspector Rank Insignia			
West Mercia Special Constabulary										West Mercia Police do not currently have a rank structure for special constables.
West Midlands Special Constabulary										
West Yorkshire Special Constabulary										The special sergeant is known as a section officer; The special inspector is known as a senior section officer; A regular chief inspector acts as a chief officer
Notes	Blank spaces in the table indicate that a rank is not used in a force's structure.; This table of constabularies is not complete.									

Police Scotland are the only force to not have a rank structure, and special constables are line managed by regular sergeants.

Wiltshire Special Constabulary has special constable section leaders (SCSLs) strategically located around the county, but no other ranks.

Police Scotland plans to experiment with a limited management role in some divisions.

== Uniform ==
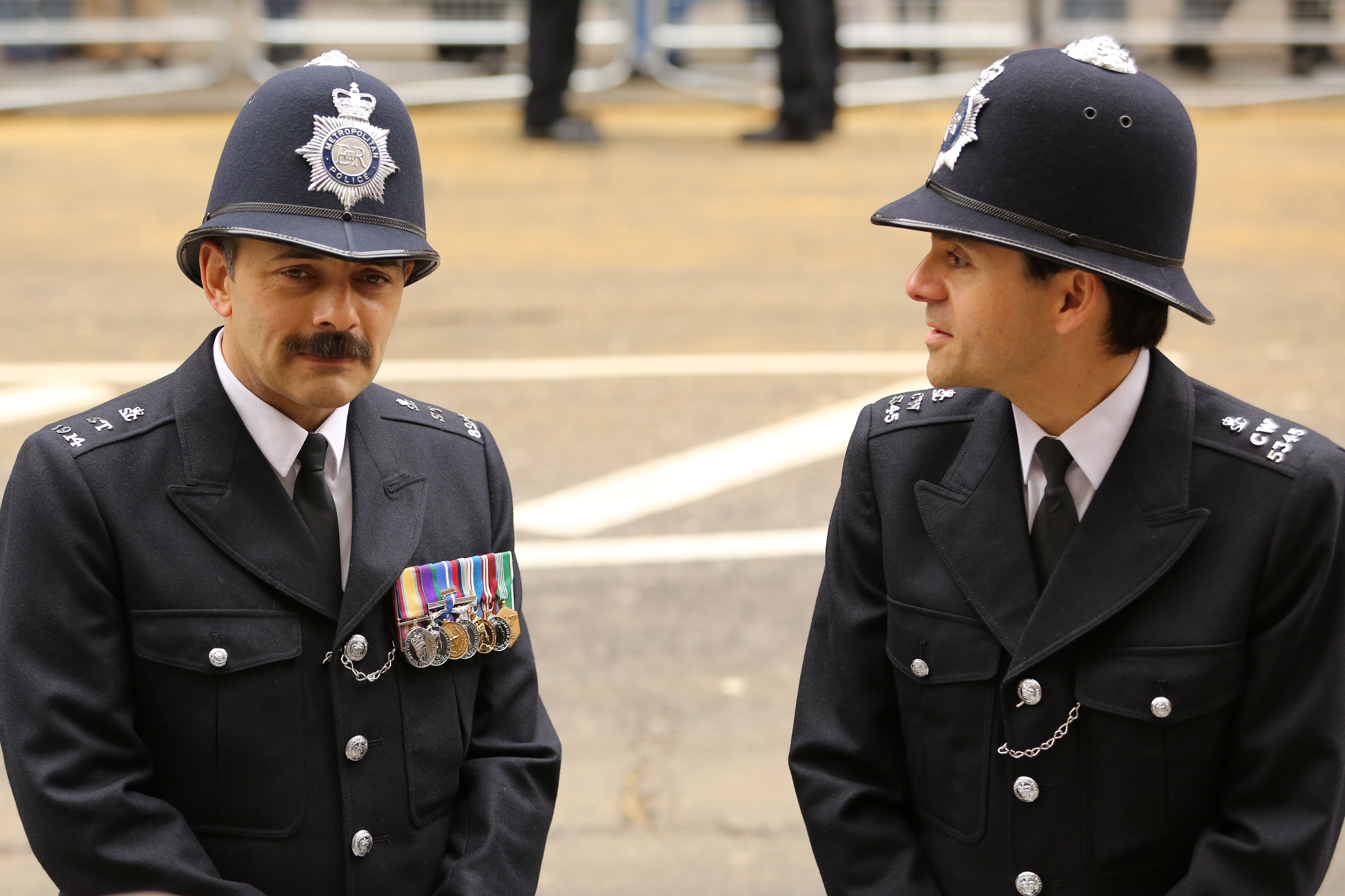
Metropolitan special constables in formal uniform in 2011, note the "SC" insignia on the shoulder.

Special constables generally wear identical uniforms to their regular colleagues.

=== Collar Numbers ===
In some constabularies, their collar/shoulder number may be prefixed with a certain digit or they may have additional insignia on their epaulettes which is usually a crown with the letters ‘SC’ above or below it (although some forces just use the letters).

For example, in Avon and Somerset Police, special constables do not wear any ‘SC’ insignia and are indistinguishable from a police constable. All Avon and Somerset Constabulary specials' collar numbers start with a "5".

=== Headgear ===
Formerly, male special constables in English and Welsh forces did not wear helmets while on foot patrol but wore patrol caps instead, but in most forces they now do wear helmets. Some forces also issue special constables with a different hat badge from that of their regular counterparts although this is now extremely rare.

== Equipment ==
Special constables all carry the same personal protective equipment (PPE) as their regular counterparts, such as handcuffs, batons, incapacitant spray (CS/PAVA spray), and protective vests.

The issuing of equipment varies from force to force with financial factors being the main reason behind the differences. In some forces protective vests, or body armour, may be personally issued to an officer, made to measure, however many other forces cannot afford this practice and instead the use of pool sets is prevalent.

The same practice is also seen with regard to radios: although many forces provide special constables with personal radios kept securely at their police station, other forces may only have pool sets. The management task is to ensure there are enough working pooled radios available in a command area to meet any "surge" need.

On 19 May 2022, Home Secretary Priti Patel announced that special constables would be able to carry tasers. Prior to this, special constables were not issued or trained to operate tasers. The British Transport Police became the first force to issues tasers to special constables on 27 May 2022, starting a group of 22. Whilst not lawfully excluded from doing so, specials do not carry firearms due to enhanced vetting and the training commitments required.

== Powers and jurisdiction ==
=== Territorial police forces ===
The vast majority of special constables serve with one of the 45 territorial police forces in the United Kingdom. Depending on where they are attested, they have full police powers throughout one of three distinct legal systems - either England and Wales, Scotland or Northern Ireland. This is identical to the jurisdiction granted to regular officers, although prior to 1 April 2007, special constables in England and Wales only had jurisdiction within their force area and any adjacent force areas. Recent changes have seen special constables enjoy the same cross-border powers as regular constables.

=== British Transport Police ===
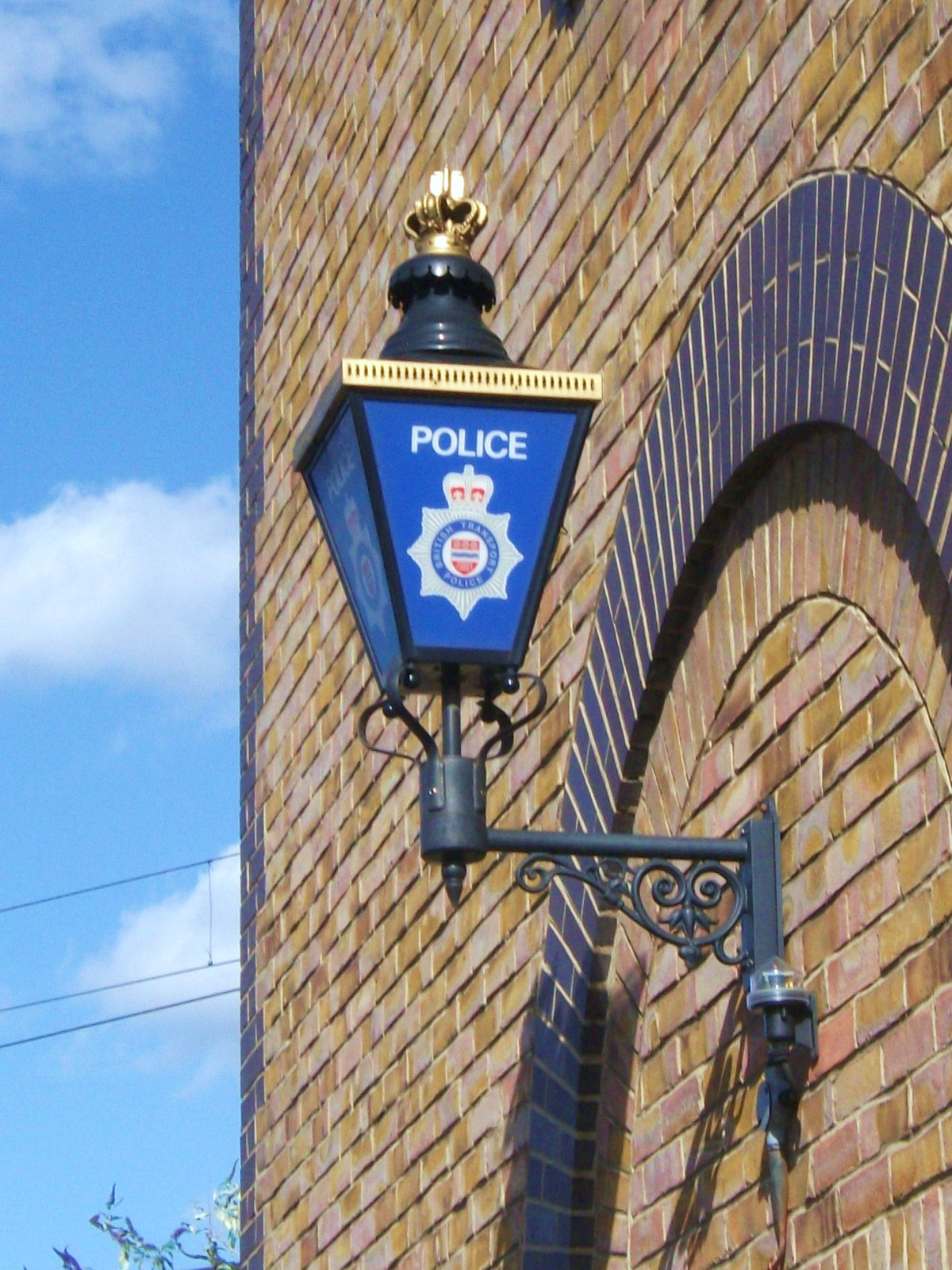
BTP Blue Lamp

See Also: British Transport Police Special Constabulary

Special constables of the British Transport Police have exactly the same powers and privileges as regular BTP constables, and the same cross-border powers. BTP special constables do not wear the distinctive "SC" insignia on their epaulettes. They work across England, Wales and Scotland and will often parade on at their home station and work 40 to 80 miles away from it.

== Duties ==
As well as patrol duties, special constables often take part in response duties and specials often police events such as sports matches, carnivals, parades and fêtes. While this event policing is the stereotypical image of a special constable, it only represents one of the wide range of duties undertaken. Many police forces in England and Wales have introduced neighbourhood policing teams and the Special Constabulary has been incorporated into this concept.

=== Special operations ===
Many special constables have taken the opportunity to join specialist teams within their constabularies such as marine support, dog units and roads policing. Durham Constabulary, Warwickshire Police, West Mercia Police and Devon and Cornwall Police have for a number of years been training some of their specials to work with their road policing units (RPU); this has been expanded and some specials with Warwickshire and West Mercia are now working with their force's criminal intercept team.

In 1995, special constables from Cheshire Police assisted officers from the Ministry of Defence Police with a surveillance operation at the former Royal Ordnance Factory at Radway Green near Crewe.

=== Public order ===
A number of special constables are trained in public order duties, including policing of football matches and demonstrations. In West Yorkshire Police, 24 specials have received Level 2 PSU (Police Support Unit) training, and have become part of the Operation Target team.

=== 2012 Olympics ===
There were plans for the Metropolitan Police to have up to 10,000 specials to help with security at the 2012 Olympic Games. This was to be done either through recruitment, with 700 extra specials being employed in the last year or by borrowing them from other forces. While this idea would have created a much safer environment for the Olympic celebrations, the plans came under fire from the police federation, which said that "volunteer special constables could drop out at the last minute, causing significant staffing problems". After the security firm G4S failed to hire enough security staff, the government called in 3,500 additional military personnel to cover the shortfall.

== Acceptance ==
Historically, special constables were often looked down upon by regular officers and resented, as they were sometimes seen as "hobby bobbies" and not proper police officers. During the 1980s, specials were often considered to be preventing regular officers from earning overtime pay.

A sizeable proportion of regular officers have served as special constables before joining the regular force, which is encouraged by recruitment departments. Most police forces will accept applications from the age of 18; and the minimum age to commence training is 17 years 9 months in Essex Constabulary and 17 years 6 months for Humberside Police.

=== Association of Special Constabulary Officers ===
The Association of Special Constabulary Officers (ASCO) was established as a registered charity to represent special constables in relation to terms and conditions and representation at various Home Office and College of Policing boards. ASCO has also represented special constables for welfare issues and supported them as a 'police friend' in misconduct cases.

In 2025, it was reported that ASCO was attempting to have Section 50 of the Employment Rights Act 1996, amended to allow time off from work ('day jobs)' for special constables to carry out policing duties.

The ASCO website states:

Our campaign seeks to amend Section 50 of the Employment Rights Act 1996 to include Special Constables among those afforded the statutory protections to take unpaid time off work to fulfil their duties.

Section 50 gives certain public service volunteers, such as magistrates, member of a health authority, councillors and school governors, amongst others, the right to request reasonable unpaid time off work and this amendment would add special constables to the list.

=== Police Federation ===
Having previously not been allowed to join, the Police, Crime, Sentencing and Courts Act 2022 now allows special constables to join the Police Federation. They are afforded the same representation as "regulars" and are eligible to become representatives, time and schedule permitting. They must also pay the same membership fee, currently £24 per month (Discounted 50% for the first year of service), despite being unpaid volunteers. This membership also allows them benefits such as "Group Insurance" and other associated perks of the Federation. Membership is not mandatory.

== Honours, medals and awards ==
Medal ribbon bar of the Special Constabulary Long Service Medal

Established by Royal Warrant on 30 August 1919, the Special Constabulary Long Service Medal may be earned by special constables after nine years' service, with a clasp issued for each additional period of 10 years. The name and rank of the recipient and the date of the award are engraved on the rim of the medal. The clasp includes the inscription "THE GREAT WAR 1914 - 18" for service as a special in The Great War or "LONG SERVICE (year clasp was issued)" for clasps earned for service after the war.

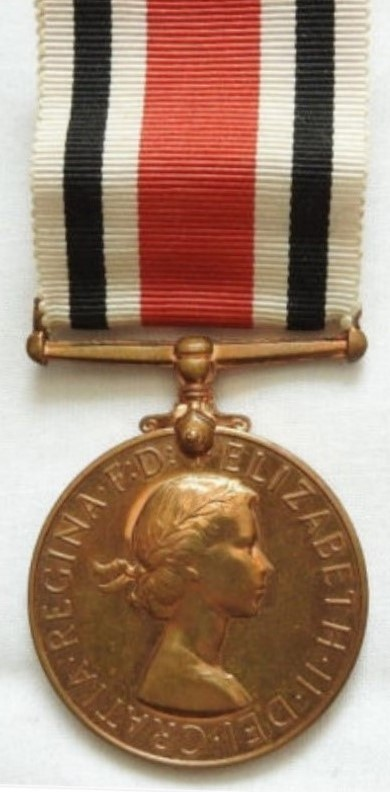
Special Constabulary Long Service Medal, Elizabeth II obverse

Special constables are also eligible for other honours and a full list of honours can be found at the List of British special constables awarded honours with seven members of the Special Constabulary being awarded MBEs and BEMs in the 2019 New Year Honours.

Special constables are now eligible to receive the King's Police Medal. On 11 March 2022 HM Queen Elizabeth II approved amendments to the Royal Warrant to expressly state that members of the Special Constabulary in England and Wales were eligible for the medal, with members of the Special Constabulary in Scotland already eligible.

=== Lord Ferrers' Awards ===
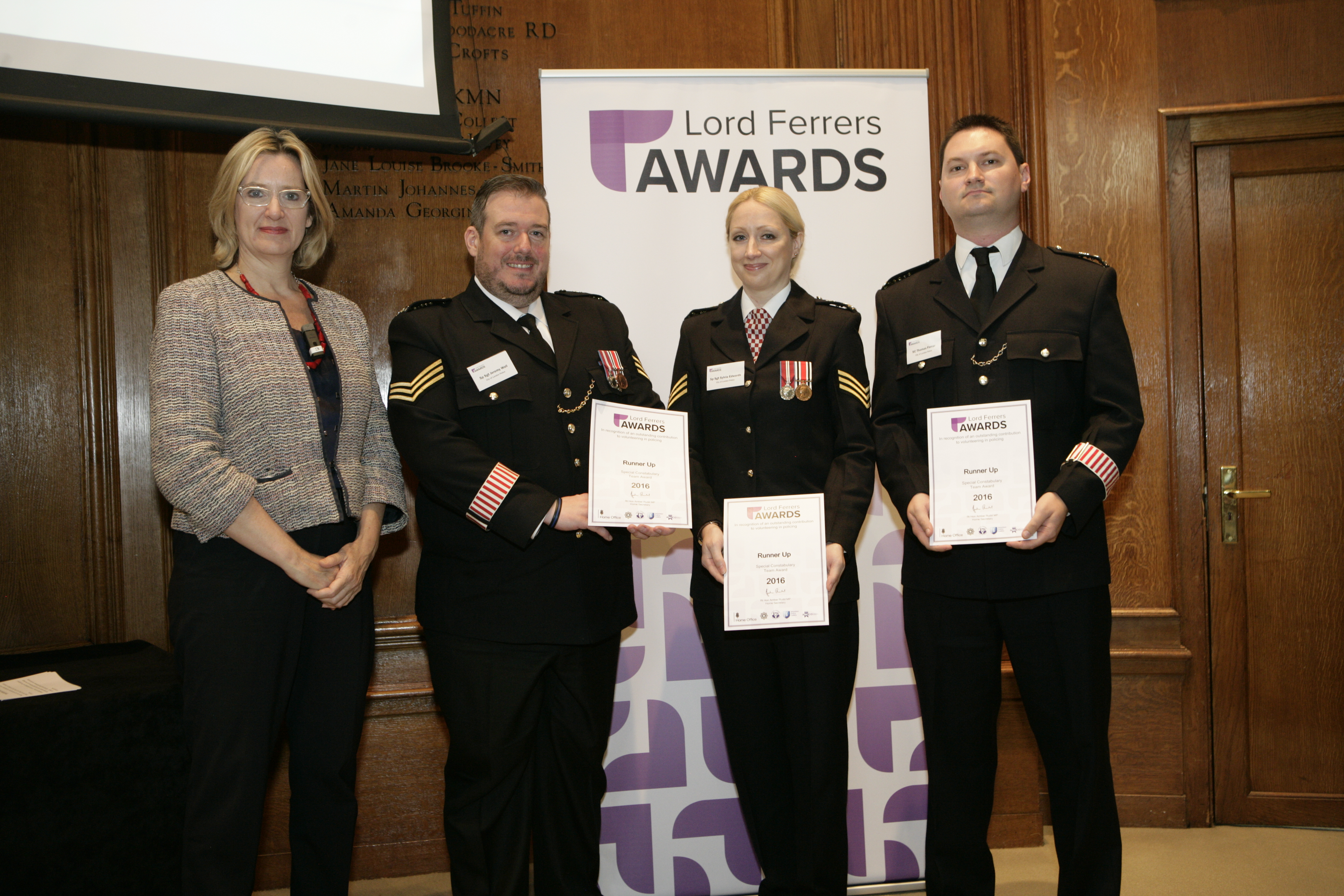
Lord Ferrers awards 2016 - City of London Police Special Constabulary.

The Lord Ferrers' Awards recognise outstanding contributions to volunteering in policing. The awards, previously known as the Special Constable and Police Support Volunteer Awards, highlight the vital role volunteers play in support of policing, by giving up their free time to make communities safer, and enhancing the effectiveness of policing across England and Wales. In 2013, they were renamed in memory of Robert Shirley, 13th Earl Ferrers, the former Home Office minister who created the awards in 1993.

== Other uses of the term "Special Constable" ==
Some bits of legislation, such as some that gives authority to form Port Police, use the term "Special Constable", whereas they are in fact paid employees of that Port/Port Police.

== See also ==
- List of British special constables awarded honours
- Auxiliary police
- British police
- Canadian Auxiliary Constable
- Constable
- Hong Kong Auxiliary Police Force
- MASHAZ - Israel's special constabulary
- Metropolitan Police
- Metropolitan Special Constabulary
- Police
- Police Service (Volunteer Police) Amendment Act 1992, the Act which created a trial of volunteer police officers in New South Wales, Australia
- Police Support Unit
- Police Support Volunteer
- Singapore Police Force
- Special constable
- Special police
- UK police ranks
- Ulster Special Constabulary
- Volunteer Special Constabulary - Singapore
