= New Zealand General Service Medal 2002 (Counter-Piracy) =

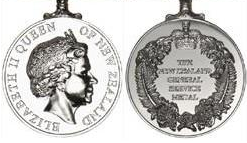
- Obverse and reverse of the medal
- Type: Campaign medal
- Awarded for: Service in counter-piracy operations since 1 January 2009
- Description: Silver disk, 38mm diameter.
- Presented by: New Zealand
- Eligibility: New Zealand Defence Force
- Clasps: None authorized
- Established: 27 March 2015
- Ribbon of the medal

The New Zealand General Service Medal 2002 (Counter-Piracy) is a New Zealand campaign medal for service in counter-piracy operations in an area centred on the Arabian Sea. The New Zealand General Service Medal 2002 (NZGSM 2002) was established by royal warrant to recognize service since 2000. The NZGSM 2002 (Counter-Piracy) was authorized by regulation on 27 March 2015. To qualify for this medal personnel must serve thirty days in an operational area as a member of a New Zealand Government contribution to a force undertaking counter-piracy operations. Only service on or after 1 January 2009 qualifies. Outside the Arabian Sea other areas of operation include the Gulf of Aden, the Western Indian Ocean, and off the coasts of Somalia, Yemen, and Oman. The earliest large deployment of New Zealand Forces was when HMNZS Te Mana served with Combined Task Force 151 and Operation Ocean Shield from November 2013 to February 2014.

== See also ==
- New Zealand campaign medals
