= East Timor Medal =

- Obverse (top left) and reverse (top right) of the medal. Ribbon: 32mm, broad green central stripe flanked by narrow red, wider black, and white stripes towards the edges.
- Type: Campaign medal
- Awarded for: Campaign service.
- Description: Silvered alloy disk, 36mm diameter.
- Presented by: New Zealand
- Eligibility: New Zealand forces and civilian personnel.
- Campaign: East Timor.
- Clasps: East Timor
- Established: 25 April 2000
- Total: 5,000
- Related: New Zealand General Service Medal 2002 (Timor-Leste)

The East Timor Medal is a New Zealand campaign medal, authorised in 2000, for award to New Zealanders who have served in East Timor from the commencement of the New Zealand involvement in June 1999 until 27 April 2006.

This campaign medal is unique in that it has been awarded to civilians from more than a dozen New Zealand government, philanthropic, or commercial organisations. These organisations have included the New Zealand Red Cross, Oxfam, Department of Corrections, New Zealand Customs Service, Ministry of Agriculture and Forestry Quarantine Service, Ministry of Foreign Affairs and Trade, New Zealand Police, New Zealand Qualifications Authority, the International Olympic Committee, Airways Consulting Ltd, Vincent Aviation, and Radiola Corporation Ltd, as well as the New Zealand Defence Force. The award of the East Timor Medal to these New Zealand civilians recognises their valuable participation in New Zealand's efforts to protect and assist the East Timorese people, and in the reconstruction of East Timor.

== Bibliography ==
- Mackay, J and Mussel, J (eds) - Medals Yearbook - 2005, (2004), Token Publishing.
- Crawford, J and Harper, G - Operation East Timor: The New Zealand Defence Force in East Timor, 1999-2001, (2001), Reed Publishing (NZ) Ltd
