= New Zealand Customs Service Medal =

- Ribbon bar of the medal
- Type: Long service and meritorious service
- Awarded for: Fourteen years of long and meritorious service in the New Zealand Customs Service
- Country: New Zealand
- Status: Currently awarded
- Established: 20 February 2008
- First award: 5 May 2008

Order of Wear
- Next (higher): New Zealand Traffic Service Medal
- Next (lower): Efficiency Decoration

The New Zealand Customs Service Medal is a long service award for members of the New Zealand Customs Service who have completed 14 years of service. Established in February 2008, the medal was first presented 5 May 2008 by then Prime Minister Helen Clark.

== Appearance ==
The medal is circular and made of silver metal. It is 36 millimetres (1.4 in) in diameter. On the obverse is the crowned effigy of the Sovereign. The reverse bears a representation of the Badge of the New Zealand Customs Service. The medal hangs from a 32 mm wide ribbon of 5 stripes of dark blue at the edges, light blue in the centre, bordered by yellow.
