= New Zealand General Service Medal 1992 (Non-Warlike) =

- Obverse (top left) and reverse (top right) of the medal. Ribbon: 32mm, dark blue with a central white stripe flanked by two red stripes.
- Type: Campaign medal
- Awarded for: Campaign service
- Description: Bronze disk, 38mm diameter
- Presented by: New Zealand
- Eligibility: New Zealand forces
- Campaign(s): Non-warlike operations 1954–
- Clasps: Korea 1954–57; Thailand; Sinai; Indian Ocean; Peshawar; Iraq; Somalia; Mozambique; Cambodia; Rwanda; Arabian Gulf; Bougainville; Korea 1958–2000
- Established: 7 May 1992

The New Zealand General Service Medal 1992 (Non-Warlike) (NZGSM 1992) is a New Zealand campaign medal, authorised in 1992, for award to New Zealanders who have served in peacekeeping operations for which no separate UN medal was issued.

Each operation covered by the medal was represented by a clasp on the ribbon; twelve clasps have been issued to date, covering operations from 1954 to the present. The medal is never issued without a clasp.

The NZGSM 1992 was issued in two varieties – one for warlike service, and another for non-warlike service. Non-warlike operations were commemorated by this medal, operational deployments were commemorated by the NZGSM 1992 (Warlike) in silver.

This medal was replaced in 2002 by the New Zealand General Service Medal 2002 – all operations commencing on after 1 January 2000 will be recognised by awards of this new medal. However the NZGSM 1992 will continue to be issued with the clasp Sinai for so long as that deployment continues, all other operations recognised by this medal have now ceased.

== Clasps ==
- Korea 1954–57
- Thailand
- Sinai
- Indian Ocean
- Peshawar
- Iraq
- Somalia
- Mozambique
- Cambodia
- Rwanda
- Arabian Gulf
- Bougainville
- Korea 1958–2000

== Bibliography ==
- Mackay, J and Mussel, J (eds). Medals Yearbook – 2005, (2004), Token Publishing.
