= Special Constabulary Long Service Medal =

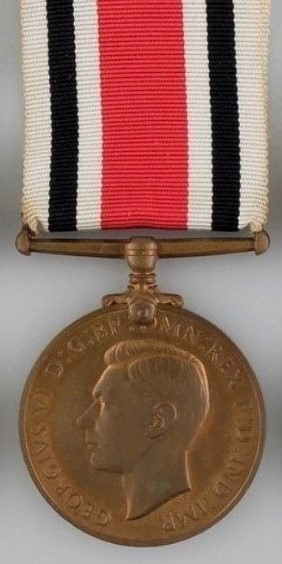
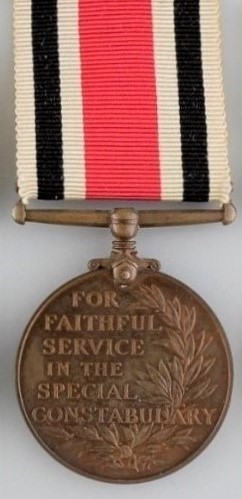
- Obverse (George VI issue) and reverse
- Type: Long service medal
- Awarded for: 9 years service
- Presented by: United Kingdom
- Eligibility: Members of the Special Constabulary
- Clasps: The Great War 1914 - 1918; Bar for 10 subsequent years of service (5 years after 11 March 2022)
- Established: 30 August 1919
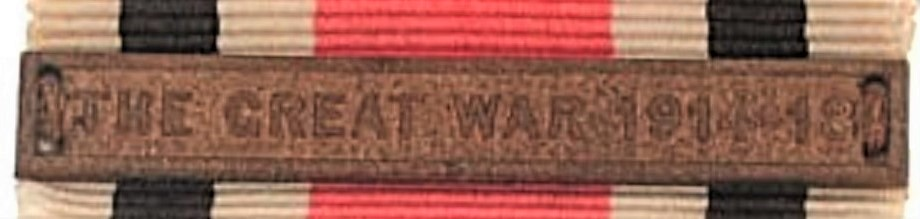
- Clasp for Great War service Clasp for second award Ribbon bar

Order of Wear
- Next (higher): H.M. Coastguard Long Service and Good Conduct Medal
- Next (lower): Canadian Forces' Decoration

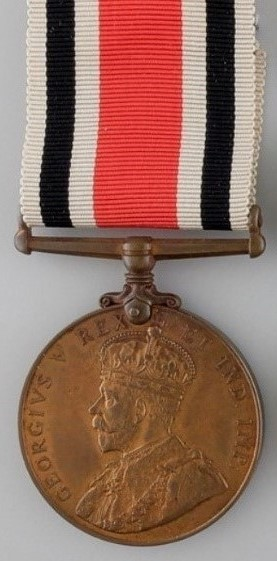
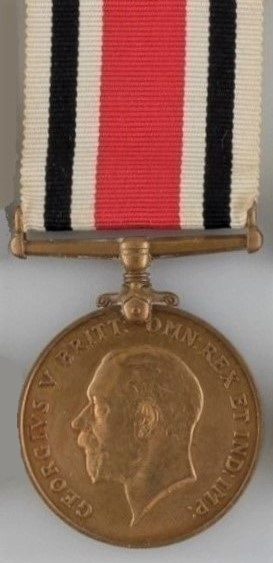
Obverse: George V issues. The uncrowned effigy was awarded from circa 1930
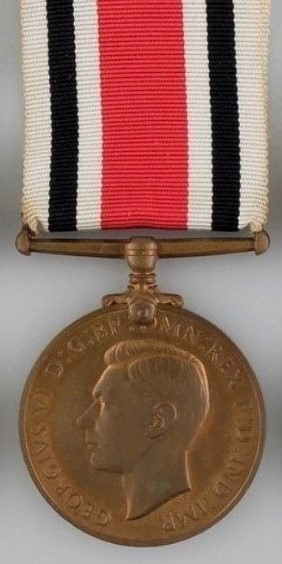
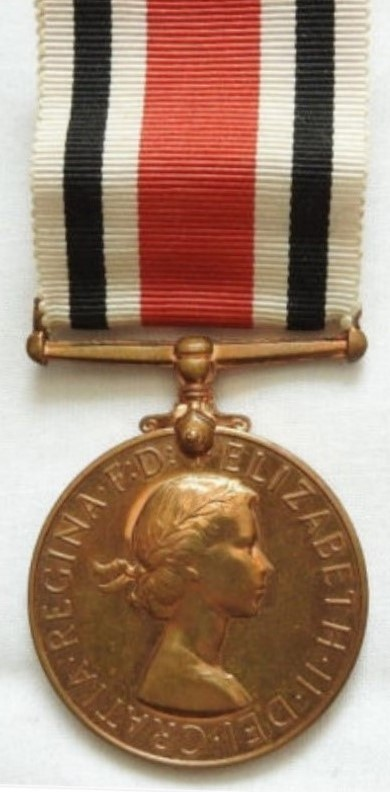
Obverse: George VI (post-1948 awards omitted words Ind Imp) and Elizabeth II

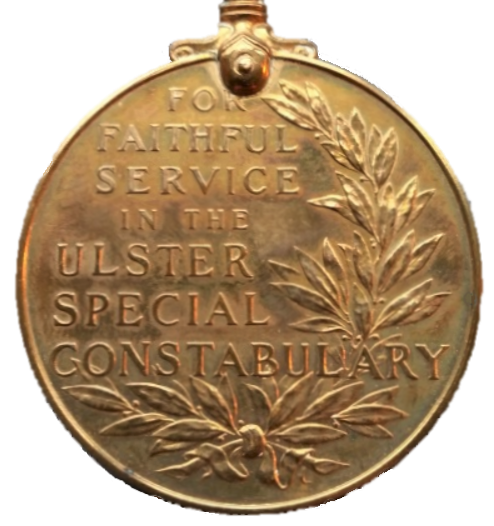
Reverse: Ulster Special Constabulary

The Special Constabulary Long Service Medal is a long service medal awarded in the United Kingdom to members of the Special Constabulary who have completed a specified period of service. Established in 1919 by King George V, the medal was initially created to reward members of the Special Constabulary for their service during World War I.

== History ==
Established on 30 August 1919 by Royal Warrant, the medal was initially known as the Special Constabulary Medal. The intent of the original warrant was to recognise the service of the members of the Special Constabulary during World War I, with further regulations to recognise nine years of service as a member of the Special Constabulary. A new Royal Warrant was promulgated in 1920 changing the name of the medal to the Special Constabulary Long Service Medal. In 1929, subsequent awards could be recognised by a clasp inscribed Long Service.

The Special Constabulary Long Service Medal was also awarded to members of the British South Africa Police Reserve for service in Southern Rhodesia after 1939, with recommendations made by the Governor of Southern Rhodesia to the Dominions Office in London. By 1965, when the last awards were made, a total of 559 medals, 71 first clasps and six second clasps had been received by members of the Reserve.

== Criteria ==
The Special Constabulary Long Service Medal may be awarded under one of four different sets of criteria:

=== Great War service ===
Special Constables who served during World War I from 1914 to 1918 for three years, and performed at least 150 police duties were eligible to be awarded the medal. Recipients who received the medal under these conditions were entitled to a clasp inscribed The Great War 1914 - 18 to denote their World War I service.

=== Special Constabulary ===
The medal may be awarded to Special Constables who are recommended by the Chief Officer of Police of the department in which they serve so long as they have served for at least nine years, and willingly and competently discharged their duty as a Special Constable. Years of service during World War I from 1914 to 1918 and service during World War II from 3 September 1939 to 31 December 1945 are counted as triple.

==== Bar Eligibility ====
Special Constables who completed an additional period of ten years service were eligible for a clasp to the medal, upon the recommendation of the Chief Officer of Police.

On 11 March 2022, the Queen approved amendments to the medal's Royal Warrant reducing the service threshold for eligibility for the awarding of clasp from 10 years to 5 years additional period of service.

=== Ulster Special Constabulary ===
Members of the Ulster Special Constabulary were eligible for award of the medal after fifteen years of service where they willingly and competently discharged their duty. Members who were serving their fifteenth year on 30 April 1970, the date the Ulster Special Constabulary was disbanded, were also eligible for award of the medal. Eligible individuals must have been recommended for award by the Chief Officer of Police, Royal Ulster Constabulary.

Special Constables who completed an additional period of ten years service were eligible for a clasp to the medal, upon the recommendation of the Chief Officer of Police. Members of the Ulster Special Constabulary who were in at least the ninth year of a subsequent ten-year period of service on 30 April 1970 were eligible for award of a clasp.

=== Royal Ulster Constabulary Reserve ===
The medal was awarded to members of the Royal Ulster Constabulary Reserve upon the recommendation of the Chief Constable, Royal Ulster Constabulary, who served fifteen years and willingly and competently discharged their duty as a member of the RUC Reserve. Service in the Ulster Special Constabulary which was not counted for the award of the medal or bar, could be counted with service as a member of the RUC Reserve.

Special Constables who completed an additional period of ten years service were eligible for a clasp to the medal, upon the recommendation of the Chief Officer of Police.

== Appearance ==
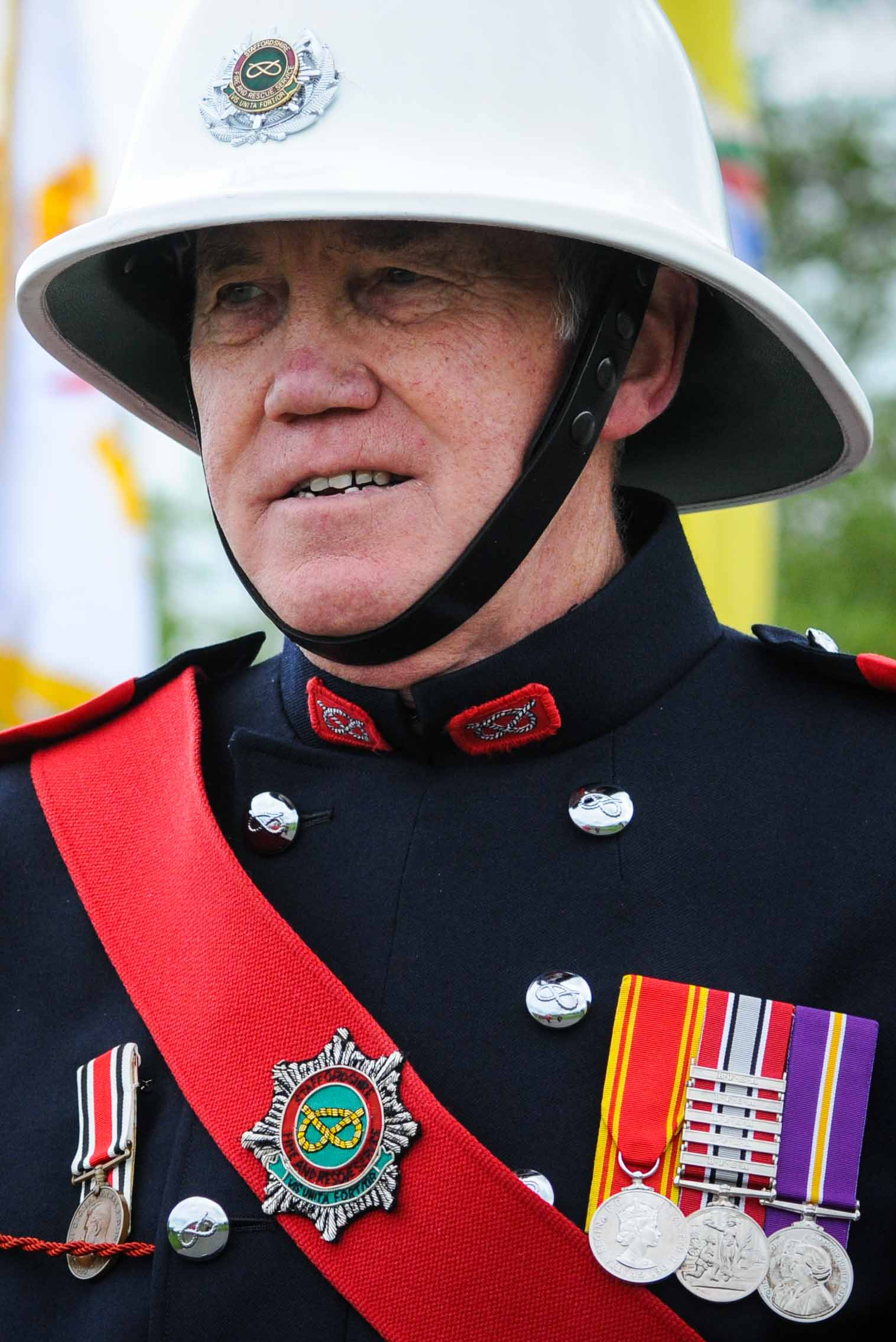
A member of the Staffordshire Fire and Rescue Service's Ceremonial Squad, wearing a Special Constabulary Long Service Medal on his right breast, indicating that it was awarded to a relative

The Special Constabulary Long Service Medal is a circular bronze medal.
The obverse bears the effigy of the reigning sovereign, surrounded by a suitable inscription.
The reverse bears the inscription in six lines FOR / FAITHFUL / SERVICE / IN THE / SPECIAL / CONSTABULARY, with a wreath below and to the right of the inscription.

In 1956, a separate reverse was created for the Ulster Special Constabulary. The only difference was in the inscription which read in seven lines: FOR / FAITHFUL / SERVICE / IN THE / ULSTER / SPECIAL / CONSTABULARY. In 1982, the reverse was modified again to recognise service in the Royal Ulster Constabulary Reserve.

Each issued medal has the name of the recipient impressed on the rim. Rank is shown for recipients above the rank of Constable.

The medal hangs from a ribbon 1 3/8 inches wide with a red centre stripe, at the edges are a white stripes bisected by an equal black stripe.

=== Clasps ===
The first clasp to the medal was created upon the establishment of the medal which denoted that the medal was awarded for service during World War I. This bronze clasp bears the inscription The Great War 1914 - 18. For subsequent awards of the medal, recipients are entitled to wear a bronze clasp with the words Long Service followed by the year the clasp was awarded. Since 1953, recipients entitled to a clasp to the medal for long service may wear a silver rosette on the service ribbon.
