= New Zealand General Service Medal 2002 (Greater Middle East) =

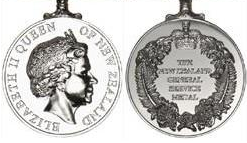
- Obverse and reverse of the medal
- Type: Campaign medal
- Awarded for: Service in the Middle East since 7 December 2014.
- Description: Silver disk, 38mm diameter.
- Presented by: New Zealand
- Eligibility: New Zealand Defence Force and others serving on a New Zealand Government deployment to support general regional security operations.
- Clasps: None authorized
- Established: 28 July 2016
- Ribbon of the medal

The New Zealand General Service Medal 2002 (Greater Middle East) is a New Zealand campaign medal for service in the Middle East since 7 December 2014.

== Criteria ==
The New Zealand General Service Medal 2002 (NZGSM 2002) was established by royal warrant to recognize service since 2000. The NZGSM 2002 (Iraq 2015) was authorized by regulation on 28 July 2016. Individuals eligible for award of the medal will have served in the operational area since 7 December 2014 as part of or with New Zealand Government deployment for general regional security operations. These eligible individuals will have been members of the New Zealand Defence Force, New Zealand police employees, employees or contractors of a government department who are New Zealand citizens or residents, and any others who the Minister of Defence, on the advice of the Chief of Defence Force, determines is eligible for the medal.

== See also ==
- New Zealand campaign medals
