= New Zealand Fire Brigades Long Service and Good Conduct Medal =

- Ribbon bar of the medal
- Type: Long service and meritorious service
- Awarded for: Fourteen years of long and meritorious service
- Presented by: New Zealand
- Eligibility: Full and part-time members of recognized New Zealand fire brigades and services
- Status: Currently awarded
- Established: 8 September 1976

Order of Wear
- Next (higher): New Zealand Police Long Service and Good Conduct Medal
- Next (lower): New Zealand Traffic Service Medal

The New Zealand Fire Brigades Long Service and Good Conduct Medal is a meritorious and long service award for members of recognized fire services in New Zealand who have completed 14 years of service.

== Criteria ==
The New Zealand Fire Brigades Long Service and Good Conduct Medal may be awarded for 14 years full or part-time service as a member of Fire and Emergency New Zealand or a fire brigade or service operated, maintained by, or registered with Fire and Emergency New Zealand or a Government Department of New Zealand. Members of company fire brigades are also eligible for the medal upon completion of the requisite period of service.

== Appearance ==
The medal is circular, silver, and 38 millimeters in diameter. On the obverse is the crowned effigy of the Sovereign. The reverse bears the inscription New Zealand Fire Brigades around the edge and For Long Service and Good Conduct at the centre, with a fern frond to the right side. The medal hangs from a vermilion ribbon 32 mm wide with a narrow centre stripe of black bordered by yellow.
