= New Zealand Traffic Service Medal =

- Ribbon bar of the medal
- Type: Long and meritorious service award
- Awarded for: Fourteen years of continuous service.
- Country: New Zealand
- Eligibility: Individuals who were serving as uniformed Traffic Officers or Road Traffic Instructors on or after 1 January 1987 and before 1 July 1992
- Status: No longer awarded
- Established: 22 December 1988

Order of Wear
- Next (higher): New Zealand Prison Service Medal
- Next (lower): New Zealand Customs Service Medal

The New Zealand Traffic Service Medal is a long service award for uniformed Traffic Officers or Road Traffic Instructors. This includes officers of the Ministry of Transport as well as officers of local authorities. Eligible personnel must have been serving on or after 1 January 1987 but before 1 July 1992. The medal recognises those who have completed 14 years of continuous service.

== Criteria ==
The New Zealand Traffic Service Medal could be awarded to Ministry of Transport Traffic Officers or Road Traffic Instructors as well as traffic officers of the various local authorities, so long as their duties were similar to Ministry of Transport personnel. Service must have been before 1 July 1992 and only those officers who were serving on or after 1 January 1987 were eligible for the medal. Traffic Officers who had previously served in the New Zealand Police could count up to seven years of service toward the award of the Traffic Service Medal, so long as that service had not been recognized by the award of the New Zealand Police Long Service and Good Conduct Medal or a clasp for the medal, and the period between the service had not been more than 28 days. Clasps were awarded to the New Zealand Traffic Service Medal for additional 7-year periods of qualifying service.

The Ministry of Transport division that enforced traffic laws, along with its officers, was merged into the New Zealand Police in 1992. Since that time, the New Zealand Police Long Service and Good Conduct Medal is awarded to Traffic Officers who meet the medal's criteria. Service as a Ministry of Transport Traffic Officer may be counted toward the 14 years of service, so long as the service is not interrupted by more than 28 days and the period of service was not recognized by the award of the New Zealand Traffic Service Medal.

== Appearance ==
The medal is circular and made of silver metal. It is 36 millimetres (1.4 in) in diameter. On the obverse is the crowned effigy of the Sovereign. The reverse bears the inscription The New Zealand Traffic Service Medal surrounded by fern fronds and surmounted by a royal crown. The medal hangs from a 32 millimetres (1.3 in) wide ribbon of light blue with a central stripe of white bordered by black stripes.
