= New Zealand Defence Service Medal =

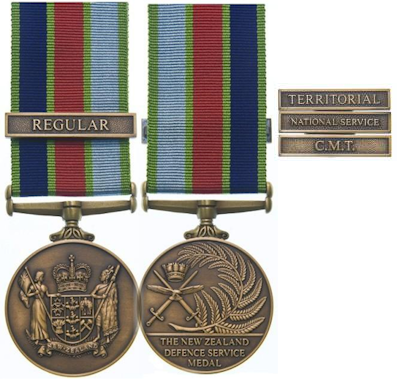
- Above: Medal and Inverse with Clasps shown Bottom: Ribbon bar of the medal
- Type: Service medal
- Awarded for: Attested military service since 3 September 1945
- Country: New Zealand
- Eligibility: Ex-Service persons and currently serving NZDF military personnel who meet the criteria set out in the Royal Warrant and associated regulations
- Clasps: REGULAR; TERRITORIAL; C.M.T. NATIONAL SERVICE
- Status: Currently awarded
- Established: April 2011

Highlights
- Total: 85,000

Precedence
- Next (higher): Cadet Forces Medal
- Next (lower): Rhodesia Medal

The New Zealand Defence Service Medal (NZDSM) is a military service medal awarded to former and current members of the New Zealand Defence Force, for qualifying service since 3 September 1945. It is expected that at least 160,000 former service personnel and more than 7,000 currently serving NZDF personnel are eligible to receive the medal.

Eligibility is defined in the Royal Warrant and NZDSM Medal Regulations, dated 6 April 2011 and 13 April 2011 respectively.

Serving NZDF personnel are awarded the medal automatically once the eligibility criteria are met. Former service members, and families of deceased service members should apply to the NZDF Medals Office.

== Appearance ==
The NZDSM is circular medal made of antiqued bronze. The obverse of the medal contains the New Zealand Coat of Arms. The reverse depicts one large New Zealand fern frond and the emblems of the Navy, Army and Air Force represented by the badge of the New Zealand Defence Force. The lower portion of the reverse contains the inscription "THE NEW ZEALAND DEFENCE SERVICE MEDAL".

The medal is suspended from a ribbon of dark blue, red, light blue. These colours are separated by thin light green stripes. The medal is awarded with at least one clasp according to the type of service for which awarded. It is possible to be awarded two or more clasps if more than one type of service was undertaken by the service member. The medal is engraved along its edge with the service number, name and regiment or service of the wearer, and the rank held on the day the eligibility criteria were met by the service member.

== Clasps ==
There are some exceptions which can be found in the relevant regulations, but the main eligibility criteria are as follows:

=== Regular ===
For three years service, continuous or aggregated, in the regular forces of the New Zealand Defence Force or (before 1990) the New Zealand Armed Forces, commencing on or after 3 September 1945.

=== Territorial ===
For a minimum of three years efficient service in the Territorial Forces of the NZDF or (before 1990) the New Zealand armed forces commencing on or after 3 September 1945.

=== C.M.T. ===
For meeting the requirements of Compulsory Military Training from 1949—1958, as stated in the relevant regulations and legislation.

=== National service ===
For having met conscripted National Service obligations as stated in the relevant legislation and regulations, from 1962—1972.
