= New Zealand General Service Medal 2002 (Timor-Leste) =

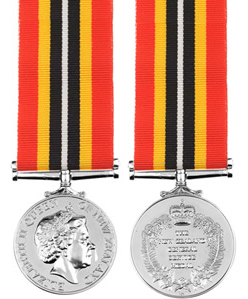
- Type: Campaign medal
- Awarded for: Campaign service.
- Description: Silver disk, 38mm diameter.
- Presented by: New Zealand
- Eligibility: New Zealand Defence Force; New Zealand Police
- Campaign: Timor-Leste 2006-
- Established: 2007
- Related: East Timor Medal

The New Zealand General Service Medal 2002 (Timor-Leste) is a New Zealand campaign medal for service in Timor-Leste during and after the 2006 East Timorese crisis between 28 April 2006 and 31 December 2012.

== Regulations ==
The New Zealand General Service Medal (Timor-Leste) was awarded for service within the political boundaries and airspace of Timor-Leste, as well as within a maritime area of 50 nmi (58 mi) around Timor-Leste and Atauro Island. Service must have been for 30 days or 7 sorties during the period from 28 April 2006 to 31 December 2012.

== Appearance ==
The New Zealand General Service Medal (Timor-Leste) is circular in shape and is made of silver-plated metal. The obverse of the medal bears the Effigy of the reigning Sovereign. The reverse bears the inscription THE NEW ZEALAND GENERAL SERVICE MEDAL surrounded by a wreath of fern fronds, pohutukawa, and kowhai blossoms, surmounted by a Royal Crown.

The ribbon of the medal is 32 mm (1.3 in) wide made up of stripes of red, yellow, black, white, black, yellow, and red.
