= Cadet Forces Medal =

- Reverse of medal
- Type: Long service medal
- Awarded for: 12 years' service.
- Presented by: United Kingdom and New Zealand and formerly Australia
- Eligibility: Commissioned Officers and non commissioned officers of the UK Cadet Forces, and Commissioned Officers of the Australian (prior to 1974) and New Zealand Cadet Forces.
- Clasps: every 8 years additional service in NZ or 6 additional years in the UK
- Status: Currently awarded
- Established: 1 February 1950
- Ribbon

Order of Wear
- Next (higher): Queen's Medal for Champion Shots of the Air Forces
- Next (lower): H.M. Coastguard Long Service and Good Conduct Medal (United Kingdom); New Zealand Defence Service Medal (New Zealand)

The Cadet Forces Medal is awarded to recognise long and efficient service by Commissioned Officers and non commissioned adult instructors of the UK Cadet Forces: The Army Cadet Force, the Air Training Corps, the Sea Cadet Corps, the Volunteer Cadet Corps and Combined Cadet Force, and Commissioned Officers of the New Zealand Cadet Forces. Authorised by a Royal warrant it is awarded for 12 years service. Additional clasps are issued for every 8 years additional service in New Zealand & for 6 additional years in the UK.

The Cadet Forces Medal was issued to Officers and Instructors within the Australian Sea Cadet Corps/Naval Reserve Cadets, Australian Army Cadet Corps and Air Training Corps between 1950 and 1974. In Australia, the award was superseded in 1999 by the Australian Cadet Forces Service Medal which was backdated to include service prior to 1999 not used for the award of the Cadet Forces Medal.

== Post Nominals ==
The Cadet Forces Service Medal carries no entitlement to use post-nominal letters.

== Description ==
- The Cadet Forces Medal is stamped in cupro-nickel in the form of a circular Medal bearing on the obverse the Crowned Effigy of the Sovereign and on the reverse the inscription “The Cadet Forces Medal”, and a representation of a torch. The name of the recipient shall be stamped on the rim of the Medal.
- The ribbon is one and a quarter inches wide which has a green background, yellow edges, narrow stripes of dark blue, red and light blue being superimposed. The ribbon shall be worn with the dark blue stripe further from the left shoulder than the stripe of light blue.
