= New Zealand General Service Medal 2002 (Solomon Islands) =

- Obverse (top left) and reverse (top right) of the medal. Ribbon: 32mm, green with central yellow stripe flanked by two dark blue stripes.
- Type: Campaign medal
- Awarded for: Service in the Solomon Islands between 2000 and 2013
- Description: Silver disk, 38mm diameter.
- Presented by: New Zealand
- Eligibility: New Zealand Defence Force and New Zealand Police personnel, as well as civilians
- Clasps: None
- Established: 2003

The New Zealand General Service Medal 2002 (Solomon Islands) (NZGSM 2002 (Sol)) was a New Zealand campaign medal for service in the Solomon Islands. The medal was awarded for service during Operation Purple Haze 1 and 2, Operation Zephyr, and the International Peace Monitoring Team from 2000 to 2002 and with the Regional Assistance Mission to Solomon Islands (RAMSI) from 2003 to 2013.

It has also been recently issued to those members of the No.3 Squadron RWTU, who deployed to the Solomon Islands in support of the security mission for the Pacific Games 2023.

== Background ==
This medal was instituted in 2002 to recognise New Zealand personnel (both military and non military) who served in the Solomon Islands and its waters between June 2000 and June 2002. Eligibility for the medal was later extended to those New Zealand personnel who have served with the RAMSI, and to New Zealand police personnel who provided support and assistance to the Solomon Islands Government in re-establishing order for 30 days or longer through 2013.

RAMSI was an Australian led intervention force providing assistance in the restoration of law and order to the Solomon Islands. At the peak of New Zealand's contribution to RAMSI, between September and November 2003, over 220 New Zealand Defence Force personnel and 35 New Zealand police officers were serving in the Solomon Islands. In all, over 1100 New Zealand Defence Force personnel have served as part of RAMSI, as have more than 430 New Zealand police officers.

The medal was most recently awarded to those that deployed to the Solomon Islands in support of the Pacific Games 2023.

== Appearance ==
The New Zealand General Service Medal (Solomon Islands) is circular in shape and is made of silver-plated metal. The obverse of the medal bears the Effigy of the reigning Sovereign. The reverse bears the inscription THE NEW ZEALAND GENERAL SERVICE MEDAL surrounded by a wreath of fern fronds, pohutukawa, and kowhai blossoms, surmounted by a Royal Crown.

The ribbon of the medal is 32 mm (1.3 in) wide and green with a central stripe yellow bordered by dark blue on each side. The colors are the main colors of the Flag of the Solomon Islands. The proportions of the ribbon's stripes is the same as the New Zealand General Service Medal 1992.
