= New Zealand Public Service Medal =

New Zealand Public Service Medal Te Tohu Ratonga Tūmatanui o Aotearoa
- Ribbon bar of the medal
- Awarded for: Meritorious exceptional performance, commitment, or innovation.
- Country: New Zealand
- Presented by: Minister of State Services
- Eligibility: Personnel of the New Zealand Public Service
- Status: Currently awarded
- Established: 19 July 2018
- First award: 6 November 2018
- Latest award: 3 November 2026

Order of Wear
- Next (higher): New Zealand Police Meritorious Service Medal
- Next (lower): New Zealand Armed Forces Award

The New Zealand Public Service Medal (Māori: Te Tohu Ratonga Tūmatanui o Aotearoa) is a meritorious service award of the New Zealand Royal Honours System. The NZPSM may be awarded to members of the public service who serve in a department under the State Services Commission. Established by royal warrant on 19 July 2018, the medal was first awarded to five recipients on 6 November 2018. In 2019, 10 PSM commendations were awarded, and in November 2020, 10 medals were conferred to exceptional public servants in recognition of meritorious service.

== Eligibility ==
A person is eligible for the medal if they perform meritorious service in their capacity as a Public Service employee who, in the opinion of the State Services Commissioner:
a) demonstrates an outstanding commitment to New Zealand and New Zealanders; or
b) is exemplary, or a model for other employees of the Public Service; or
c) brings significant benefit to New Zealand or the Public Service; or
d) is exceptional and otherwise worthy of recognition.

Non-New Zealand citizens are also eligible for the medal. It can be awarded posthumously.

== Description ==
It is a circular silver medal, 36mm in diameter. It is worn on the left breast from a ribbon by way of a ring, and has the following design:

- The obverse has the effigy of Elizabeth II designed by Ian Rank-Broadley, surrounded by the legend ELIZABETH II QUEEN OF NEW ZEALAND.
- The reverse, designed by the New Zealand Herald Extraordinary Phillip O’Shea, shows a representation of a Māori poutama, or step design, bearing the wording in English and Māori FOR MERITORIOUS SERVICE and HE TOHU HIRANGA, surrounded by the inscriptions THE NEW ZEALAND PUBLIC SERVICE MEDAL and TOHU RATONGA TŪMATANUI O AOTEAROA.
- The name of the recipient is engraved on the rim of the medal.
- The 32 mm wide ribbon is of red ochre with a wide central blue stripe and a narrow white stripe at both edges. The NZPSM design is based on the ribbon of the British Imperial Service Order and Medal which were awarded to public servants in New Zealand from 1904 to 1974.

== Recipients ==
=== 2018 ===
The inaugural recipients of the New Zealand Public Services Medal were announced on 6 November 2018.

- Isabel Irene Evans – of Auckland.
- Miriama Evans OStJ – of Wellington.
- Kyle Justin Kuiti – of Foxton.
- Malia Matalena Tusiga Leaupepe – of Wellington.
- Brodie John Stubbs – of Wellington.

=== 2019 ===
Recipients in 2019 were announced on 4 November.

- Diane Siua Fenika – of Christchurch.
- Mabel Flight – of Tūrangi.
- Ann Maree Hayes – of Invercargill.
- John Patrick Henderson – of Christchurch.
- Kaye MacDonald – of Blenheim.
- Dr Craig Malcolm Trotter – of Lower Hutt.

=== 2020 ===
Recipients in 2020 were announced on 2 November.

- Christine Tapa’aufa’asisina Aiolupotea-Aiono – of Auckland.
- Annette Karina Aranui – of Napier.
- Paula Maree Attrill – of Wellington.
- Shona Mavis Carr – of Auckland.
- Margaret Clare Dotchin – of Auckland.
- Roy Thomas Grose – of Blenheim.
- Dr Nicholas Francis Jones – of Heretaunga.
- Keti Tipene – of Motatau.
- Hugo Vitalis – of Wellington.
- Duane Andrew Wilkins – of Wellington.

=== 2021 ===
Recipients in 2021 were announced on 26 January and 9 November.

- Jan Elizabeth Breakwell – of Wellington.
- Hinemoa Maraea Dixon – of Hamilton.
- Ann Dysart – Te Rarawa, of Wellington.
- Steve Hori Patrick Haami – of Whanganui.
- Renee Lee Higgison – of Wellington.
- Elizabeth Jones – of Wellington.
- Mamakoula Tuitupou Kutu – of Wellington.
- Jeffrey Ronald Montgomery – of Wellington.
- Dr Gerardus Johannes Rys – of Wellington.
- Dr Sripriya Somasekhar – of Wellington.
- Dr Prudence Helen Williams – of Wellington.

=== 2022 ===
Recipients in 2022 were announced on 8 November and 15 December.

- Cheryl Elisabeth Barnes – of Wellington.
- Terry Graeme Brown – of Auckland.
- Christopher John Bunny – of Wellington.
- John Francis Cavanagh – of Auckland.
- Bryan Roger Chapple – of Wellington.
- Carl Antony Crafar – of Wellington.
- Serena Madeline Curtis – of Wellington.
- Annique Krystyna Tepaeru-Oanoa Davis – of Ngāti Tangiiau, Ngāti Teaia, Te Rarawa, Ngāti Kurī.
- Michael Paul Dreyer – of Wellington.
- Kelly Maree Dunn – of Wellington.
- Mārama Sharelle Edwards Hohaia – of Wellington.
- Ruth May Fairhall – of Wellington.
- Abba Siale Fidow – of Auckland.
- Suzanne Isobel Gordon – of Wellington.
- Jessica Kate Gorman – of Wellington.
- Andrew James Hagan – of Wellington.
- Stephen Alexander Ham – of Napier.
- Shayne Alan Hunter – of Wellington.
- Rosalina Jamieson – of Wellington.
- Keiran Marie Kennedy – of Wellington.
- Jean Maurice Marie Le Roux – of France.
- Ellen Margaret MacGregor-Reid – of Wellington.
- Andrew Graham Milne – of Wellington.
- Christina Margaret Paterson – of Wellington.
- Heather Anne Louise Peacocke – of Wellington.
- Dr Humphrey Weir Hamilton Pullon – of Hamilton.
- Vivian George Herbert Rickard – of Wellington.
- Joanna Rachel Rogers – of Wellington.
- Geoffrey Paul Short – of Wellington.
- Michael John Slater – of Hokitika.
- Grace Smit – of Wellington.
- Robert Wayne Smith Jr – of Auckland.
- Suzanne Stew – of Wellington.
- Paul Gerard George Stocks – of Wellington.
- Shelley Tucker – of Wellington.
- John David Walsh – of Hāwera.
- Stephen Blair Waugh – of Auckland

=== 2023 ===
Recipients in 2023 were announced on 14 February, 8 March, and 9 November.

- Rita Sauniuni Ale – of Hawke's Bay.
- Diane Catherine Anderson – of Wellington.
- Dr William Michael Arnold – of Wellington.
- Karla Shirley Beazley – Ngāti Te Ata Waiohua, Ngāti Rēhua.
- Christina Ann Connolly – of Wellington.
- Angela Kate Coyle – of Wellington.
- Bruce Ellis – of Auckland.
- Judith Anne Forman – of Petone.
- Dr Michael Anthony Hurrell – of Christchurch.
- Terence William Lynch – of Tai Tokerau Northland.
- Beverley Anne Markham – of New Plymouth.
- Christine Barbara McKenna – of Christchurch.
- Elspeth Margaret McNeile – of Auckland.
- Wiki Michelle Mulholland – of Palmerston North.
- Qemajl Murati – of Auckland.
- Michael Patrick O'Rourke – of Wellington.
- Tania Ott – of Wellington.
- Jon Dennis Peacock – of Island Bay.
- Dr Hugh Alexander Robertson – of Wellington.
- Penelope Wendy Rounthwaite – of Westport.
- Mark John Steel – of Wellington.
- Christopher Charles Szekely – of Wellington.
- Easter Harriet Fialogo Tagaloa-Pauga – of Samoa.
- Russell James Thomas – Ngāti Rārua, Ngāti Toa Rangatira, Ngāi Tahu, Ngāti Tama and Te Ātiawa, of Te Tauihu.
- Catherine Anne Thompson – of Wairarapa.
- Alan William Wilson – of Rotorua.

=== 2024 ===
Recipients in 2024 were announced on 8 November.

- John Anthony Fisher – Ngāi Te Rangi, of Tauranga.
- Stephen John Hamilton – of Wellington.
- Rena Nina Hona – Ngāpuhi ki Whaingaroa, of Wellington.
- Natana Patricia Karauria – of Wellington.
- Deborah Catharine Roxburgh – of Whanganui.
- Vicki Jean Soal – of Wellington.
- Moses Rahiri Toeke – Ngāpuhi, of Pukekohe.
- John Robert Young – of Wellington.

=== 2025 ===
Recipients in 2025 were announced on 5 November.

- Jaimie Donald Baird – of Wellington.
- Raviv Carasuk – of Christchurch.
- Karen English – of Wellington.
- Christopher Garry Linton – of Wellington.
- Robert Bruce Loo – of Southland.
- Graham Andrew MacPherso – of Whangārei.
- Ropeta Mene-Tulia – of Christchurch.
- Donald Willem Riezebos – of Wellington.
- Suzanne Carol Smith – of Christchurch.
- Sharon Anne Wagener – of Wellington.

=== 2026 ===
Recipients in 2026 were announced on 3 November.

- Hilary Ann Aikman – of Wellington.
- Dr John Adrian Crawshaw – of Wellington.
- Cynthia Mary Ellis – of Tūrangi.
- Dierdre Louise Fell – of Palmerston North.
- Stephen John Hemara – Ngāpuhi, of Auckland.
- Andrew David Lockhart – of Auckland.
- Susan Maree Morris – of Wellington.
- John David Nash – of Wellington.
- Stephen James Walshe – of Wellington.
