= New Zealand Armed Forces Award =

- Ribbon bar of the medal
- Type: Medal for long service
- Awarded for: Fourteen years of unblemished service
- Country: New Zealand
- Eligibility: Regular Force officers of the New Zealand Defence Force
- Clasps: For each additional 7 years of service
- Status: Currently awarded
- Established: 6 May 1985

Order of Wear
- Next (higher): New Zealand Public Service Medal
- Next (lower): New Zealand Army Long Service and Good Conduct Medal

The New Zealand Armed Forces Award is a long service decoration for Regular Force Officers of the New Zealand Defence Force. Established on 6 May 1985, the medal was originally presented for 15 years of unblemished service. On 14 August 2020, a new gazette was issued with modified criteria for the medal to be awarded for 14 years of service. Clasp eligibility was reduced from 15 years to seven years.

== Appearance ==
The New Zealand Armed Forces Award is a circular silver medal. The obverse bears the crowned effigy of Her Majesty The Queen surrounded by the inscription ELIZABETH II DEI GRATIA REGINA FID. DEF. The reverse shows two crossed swords, pointed upwards, with a spread winged eagle superimposed in the centre, surmounted by a Naval Crown. Behind the swords are two fern fronds with their stems crossed at the base. The whole design is surrounded by the inscription New Zealand above and Armed Forces Award below. The emblems on the reverse are representative of the three services: the New Zealand Defence Force, the New Zealand Army, the Royal New Zealand Navy, and the Royal New Zealand Air Force.

The medal is suspended by a ribbon of dark blue, crimson, and light blue. These colours represent the three services, while the black central stripe represents New Zealand. Subsequent awards of the medal are denoted by a clasp worn on the suspension ribbon of the medal or as a rosette on the service ribbon worn in undress.

== Notable Recipients ==
- Lt Gen Rt Hon Sir Jerry Mateparae GNZM QSO KStJ
- Air Marshal Kevin Short
- Charles III (2012).
