= New Zealand General Service Medal 2002 (Afghanistan) =

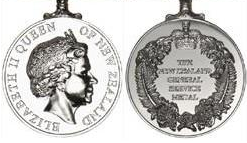
- Obverse and reverse of the medal
- Type: Campaign medal
- Awarded for: Service within the airspace and territorial boundaries of Afghanistan (primary operational area) or in other countries where forces were based to participate in operations (secondary operational area).
- Presented by: New Zealand
- Eligibility: New Zealand civilians, members of the New Zealand Defence Force, or any other persons whom the Prime Minister, on the advice of the Minister of Defence, may determine.
- Campaign: War in Afghanistan (2001–present)
- Status: Currently awarded
- Established: 16 January 2003
- Ribbon bar for the primary operational area Ribbon bar for the secondary operational area

The New Zealand General Service Medal 2002 (Afghanistan) (NZGSM 2002 (Afghanistan)) is a campaign medal of New Zealand that recognizes service in the War in Afghanistan. The Queen of New Zealand authorized the creation of a new General Service Medal for the recognition of service taking place after December 2001 with a royal warrant on 23 July 2002. Regulations to establish the NZGSM 2002 (Afghanistan) were published 16 January 2003.

There are two versions:

- Primary Operations Area
- Secondary Operations Area

The new Regulations approved in December 2018 allow personnel who completed the required amounts of qualifying service in both the secondary and primary operational areas to wear both the NZGSM (Afghanistan: Primary Operational Area) and the NZGSM (Afghanistan: Secondary Operational Area). Previously they were only awarded one NZGSM (Afghanistan), and wore it with the ribbon for the primary operational area.

== Appearance ==
The New Zealand General Service Medal 2002 (Afghanistan) is circular in shape and is made of silver-plated metal. The obverse of the medal bears the Effigy of the reigning Sovereign. The reverse bears the inscription THE NEW ZEALAND GENERAL SERVICE MEDAL surrounded by a wreath of fern fronds, pōhutukawa, and kōwhai blossoms, surmounted by a Royal Crown.

The ribbon of the medal is 32 mm (1.3 in) wide and green with 3 narrow central stripes red, black, and red. For the secondary operational area, the ribbon has narrow stripes of light blue at the edges of the ribbon. Black, red and green are the colours of the Flag of Afghanistan. Black stands for the past, red stands for blood shed in the fight for independence, and green represents hope. The light blue edges for the secondary operational area ribbon stands for service at sea and in the air in the areas surrounding Afghanistan. The proportions of the ribbon's stripes is the same as the New Zealand General Service Medal 1992.

== See also ==
- New Zealand campaign medals
