= New Zealand Police Long Service and Good Conduct Medal =

- Ribbon bar of the medal
- Type: Long service and meritorious service
- Awarded for: Fourteen years of long and meritorious service
- Country: New Zealand
- Eligibility: Full-time sworn members of the New Zealand Police from 1 January 1976, and New Zealand Police Traffic Officers from 1 July 1992
- Status: Currently awarded
- Established: 8 September 1976

Order of Wear
- Next (higher): Royal New Zealand Air Force Long Service and Good Conduct Medal
- Next (lower): New Zealand Fire Brigades Long Service and Good Conduct Medal

The New Zealand Police Long Service and Good Conduct Medal is a long service award for full-time sworn officers and traffic officers of the New Zealand Police who have completed 14 years of service.

== Criteria ==
The New Zealand Police Long Service and Good Conduct Medal may be awarded for 14 years full-time service as a sworn officer the New Zealand Police for service on or after 1 January 1976. The medal may also be awarded to full-time Traffic Officers who have met the length of service criteria for service on or after 1 July 1992. Clasps may be awarded to the medal for seven additional years of qualifying service.

== Appearance ==
The medal is circular, silver, and 38 millimetres (1.5 in) in diameter. On the obverse is the crowned effigy of the Sovereign. The reverse bears a representation of St Edward's Crown, a sceptre, and sword resting on a cushion surrounded by an oak and fern frond wreath. This is surrounded by the inscription New Zealand Police—For Long Service and Good Conduct. The medal is suspended from a crimson ribbon 32 millimetres (1.3 in) wide. In the centre is a narrow blue stripe bordered by stripes of white.
