= New Zealand General Service Medal 2002 (Iraq 2003) =

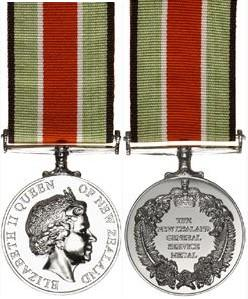
- Type: Campaign medal
- Awarded for: Campaign service.
- Description: Silver disk, 38mm diameter.
- Presented by: New Zealand
- Eligibility: New Zealand Defence Force
- Campaign: Iraq 2003-
- Established: 2004

The New Zealand General Service Medal 2002 (Iraq 2003) (NZGSM 2002 (Iraq)) was a New Zealand campaign medal for service in the Iraq.

This medal was instituted in 2004 to recognise New Zealand personnel (both military and non military) who have served in Iraq since 27 May 2003. The initial New Zealand Defence Force contribution consisted of two personnel who served with the United Nations Mine Action Service’s Mine Action Coordination Team based in Basrah. Military engineers and support personnel were subsequently deployed to Iraq under United Nations Resolution 1483, to work on humanitarian, rehabilitation and reconstruction projects.

The qualifying period for the medal starts from 27 May 2003 for mine clearance operations, and 17 September 2003 for service with the British led Multi-National Division in (Southeast) Iraq undertaking humanitarian, rehabilitation and reconstruction projects.

== Clasps ==
None authorised
