= List of London's Burning episodes =

The following is a list of all the episodes that featured in all 14 series of London's Burning (1988–2002). This list includes the original 1986 TV film that the series was based on and the Christmas special "Ding Dong Merrily", which aired between Series 1 and Series 2. Additionally it is the only episode of London's Burning with a title.

== Series overview ==
Series	Episodes	Originally released	
Series	Episodes	First released	Last released
TV Movie		7 December 1986	
1	5	20 February 1988	19 March 1988
Special		25 December 1988	
2	8	22 October 1989	10 December 1989
3	8	30 September 1990	18 November 1990
4	10	29 September 1991	1 December 1991
5	10	27 September 1992	29 November 1992
6	10	3 October 1993	5 December 1993
7	15	4 September 1994	18 December 1994
8	15	3 September 1995	17 December 1995
9	15	1 September 1996	2 February 1997
10	18	14 September 1997	22 February 1998
11	16	12 September 1998	28 February 1999
12	16	9 January 2000	9 July 2000
13	16	21 January 2001	20 May 2001
14	8	7 July 2002	25 August 2002

== Episodes ==
=== TV Movie (1986) ===
No. overall	No. in series	Title	Directed by	Written by	Original release date	UK viewers (millions)
1	S	"Pilot"	Les Blair	Jack Rosenthal	7 December 1986	N/A
Josie Ingham, Blackwall's first female firefighter, arrives to join Blue Watch, and most react with hostility, ignoring her completely at her first shouts. However, she resolves the situation when Blue Watch are called to rescue a man who has trapped his private parts in a curtain ring. Vaseline gets married for the third time, to a third woman also named Marion, although the ceremony is disrupted when his ex-wife Marion turns up. Later, Blue Watch rescue three children trapped in a burning house, but one of them dies. Bayleaf angrily rants at the mother when he realises she had left the children alone in the house and has gone to a disco. Ethnic is promoted to Leading Firefighter at Archway, so Blue Watch plans a surprise leaving dinner for him. The day before his last shift, he takes a day off. That night, a riot breaks out on Ethnic's estate, and when the watch arrives, they quickly find themselves under attack. Although off duty, Ethnic rushes to defend Charisma from rioters and is killed when a concrete slab is thrown at him. The next day, the watch silently eat what was to have been Ethnic's surprise leaving dinner.

=== Series 1 (1988) ===
No. overall	No. in series	Title	Directed by	Written by	Original release date	UK viewers (millions)
2	1	"Episode 1"	John Reardon	Tony Hoare	20 February 1988	N/A
Vaseline accidentally runs over a cat. Later on his boots, which he has been using to moonlight as a gardener, catch fire during a shout; two men break into a posh man's house and after robbing him cement his feet into his toilet; the money the watch raised to pay for a young boy's operation is stolen.
3	2	"Episode 2"	Gerry Poulson	Tony Hoare	27 February 1988	N/A
Hallam is irate because his father-in-law has moved in with them; the watch visit a factory for a safety inspection, where Malcolm strikes up a friendship with Samina; Marion reveals to Vaseline that she is pregnant; the watch are called to rescue three people stuck in a lift in a block of flats and arrive to find two of the trapped women fighting; later there is a fire at the factory and Samina is killed; the watch attend Sicknote's performance of South Pacific.
4	3	"Episode 3"	Gerry Mill	Anita Bronson	5 March 1988	N/A
Charisma meets Donna – Liversalt's ex-girlfriend – in a bar; Malcolm, Tony and George fill Sicknote's bike with sand; Tate chides Hallam for calling out reinforcements to search for missing people in a collapsed building on the say so of a drunken woman; the watch try to warn Charisma about Donna but it ends with a blazing row; Blue Watch are called to a chemical fire, where a still-angry Charisma is injured in the resulting explosion, although Donna is more interested in his compensation.
5	4	"Episode 4"	Gerry Mill	Anita Bronson	12 March 1988	N/A
The watch persuade a reluctant George to take part in a brigade boxing tournament; Josie is nearly raped by David, a man she met at evening class, but manages to fight him off; the watch are called to a shout where a mentally disabled man is threatening to leap from scaffolding; Tate suffers a mental breakdown and fails to show up for work. When he is finally located, he is given a week's leave.
6	5	"Episode 5"	Gerry Mill	Anita Bronson	19 March 1988	N/A
Blackwall hosts an open day for children; two armed men and a woman burst in and hold the entire group hostage; the watch eventually manage to overpower two of them, and Tate talks the other into surrendering voluntarily.

=== Christmas Special (1988) ===
No. overall	No. in series	Title	Directed by	Written by	Original release date	UK viewers (millions)
7	S	"Ding Dong Merrily"	Les Blair	Tony Hoare	25 December 1988	N/A
Josie, Bayleaf, Kevin and Malcolm find Charisma dressed up as Santa Claus collecting money for charity. The watch draw lots to decide who gets to have Christmas Day off and Vaseline and Tony are the lucky ones, much to Sicknote's annoyance. While rushing to a shout, the fire engine overturns after slamming into a car being driven by a drunk driver. Josie and Bayleaf sleep together; George and Vaseline moonlight as taxi drivers for Cyril, but George is arrested for kerb crawling and Vaseline crashes his car into a house. Tony and Dorothy have Christmas dinner with their parents, who do not get along, and both finally snap and walk out. Kevin's father escapes from prison and turns up at Blackwall. Hallam's eyebrows are burned off after his father-in-law douses the Christmas pudding with too much brandy. The watch are called to a fire at a restaurant where Vaseline is having dinner with Marion; they all return to Blackwall for Christmas dinner and sing "Ding Dong Merrily on High, the Sub Has Got No Eyebrows!"

=== Series 2 (1989) ===
No. overall	No. in series	Title	Directed by	Written by	Original release date	UK viewers (millions)
8	1	"Episode 1"	John Reardon	Anita Bronson	22 October 1989	N/A
Kevin's brother Micky is playing truant from school and making malicious hoax 999 calls to the station; Sicknote tries to introduce a smoking ban; Sandra Hallam introduces Bayleaf to Clare, a firefighter's widow; while driving for Cyril George meets Julia and immediately falls for her, but she turns him down; at Malcolm's suggestion, he sends her poetry and mimes to Sicknote's singing outside her house and she asks him out.
9	2	"Episode 2"	Gerry Mill	Anita Bronson	29 October 1989	N/A
The new ADO, the pedantic and disciplinarian Scase, arrives at Blackwall; Marion gives birth to a son; Micky and his friends cause a fire at their school; Charisma is still unable to get rid of Donna, who refuses to leave his house, saying she is now legally his common law wife; Hallam is appointed temporary station officer at Borough Street station, where he finds that Maddox, a black officer, is being bullied by his colleagues, led by the racist Scouser; Charisma's mum/sister arrives from Australia and forcibly evicts Donna.
10	3	"Episode 3"	John Reardon	Anita Bronson	5 November 1989	N/A
Charisma bores the watch with tales about Big Ron; the watch are called to deal with a leaking nuclear container on a freight train; at Borough Street, Maddox is tied to a ladder and hoisted over a pool made of hose pipes; Scouser flips over the ladder, forcing Maddox's head underwater; Hallam arrives and pulls an unconscious Maddox out of the water. Josie passes her leading firefighter exams; Vaseline's ex-wife, also named Marion, arrives and is invited to stay by the other Marion; the watch are called to an accident, where a young window cleaner has been impaled on metal railings after falling over.
11	4	"Episode 4"	Gerry Poulson	Anita Bronson	12 November 1989	N/A
Blue Watch are called to save construction workers trapped under collapsed scaffolding on the banks of the River Thames near Greenwich; Tate ignores Scase's orders to first secure the scaffolding as the tide is coming in quickly; Scase responds by reporting Tate for insubordination; Sicknote is jealous when Dominic is given the lead role in a play ahead of him, alongside Jean; the two Marions gang up on Vaseline.
12	5	"Episode 5"	Gerry Mill	Anita Bronson	19 November 1989	N/A
Scase and Tate are both disciplined by Area Commander Bulstrode, but it is Scase who is transferred away; Charisma does a magic act for Jaffa's gran; Blue Watch attend a blaze at the café across the road; Josie passes her officer's exams; Dorothy gets a job at a bar, although Tony disapproves.
13	6	"Episode 6"	John Reardon	Anita Bronson	26 November 1989	N/A
Sicknote has left Jean and moved in with Charisma; Hallam is called to testify at the Brigade disciplinary hearing for the incident involving Maddox; George is still pining for Julia, but she leaves him when she realises he does not trust her; a young girl is electrocuted while trying to retrieve her brother's cap near an electrical generator; at Maddox's hearing all five officers are found guilty and dismissed from the job; Vaseline sees Malcolm kissing Julia and tells George, who tries to attack Malcolm; Blue Watch have to rescue a man trapped in a sewer.
14	7	"Episode 7"	Gerry Poulson	Tony Hoare	3 December 1989	N/A
It is Bonfire Night and Blue Watch are on alert; at a shout Sicknote is tasked with rescuing a parrot on a rooftop; Sicknote and Charisma continue to bicker about living together, while George is still convinced that Malcolm cheated on him with Julia and attacks him again; two rival gangs of kids light each other's bonfires, unaware that a boy is asleep inside one; Clare's son is injured by a firework.
15	8	"Episode 8"	Gerry Mill	Tony Hoare	10 December 1989	N/A
The two Marions go out for the evening, leaving Vaseline to babysit his son; Dorothy leaves Tony; all the members of the watch (except a depressed Tony and Vaseline who is babysitting again) go to see Sicknote in The Student Prince, but they annoy him by singing along; Blue Watch are checking local fire hydrants when a van falls into the river; Vaseline, Bayleaf and George dive underwater to rescue the occupants, but Vaseline does not come back up; his BA set has malfunctioned underwater, drowning him.

=== Series 3 (1990) ===
No. overall	No. in series	Title	Directed by	Written by	Original release date	UK viewers (millions)
16	1	"Episode 1"	Gerry Mill	Anita Bronson	30 September 1990	N/A
The watch arrive at a house fire and rescue the children; Charisma has left the watch and transferred to staff; Josie is also leaving to become leading firewoman at Charlton, so the watch hold a party in her honour and hire Technique as a stripper; Vaseline's replacement arrives: Colin, fresh out of training and very gullible; the watch convince Colin that Tate is a born again Christian and that he should say grace before every meal; Malcolm continues to blame himself for Vaseline's death, having ordered him to use his BA set underwater, but is only given an informal warning by Bulstrode; Josie spots David, the man who attempted to rape her, and causes a scene until he is arrested.
17	2	"Episode 2"	John Reardon	Anita Bronson	7 October 1990	N/A
The watch play another prank on Colin, this time getting him to monitor radioactive particles in the atmosphere and persuade him that he must sign the Official Secrets Act; even Bulstrode sees the funny side and joins in with the ruse; Josie takes charge during a tar spill; Hallam is sent on a training course with Duffy; Tony meets up with Jenny, an old flame; a ship's engine room catches fire and the watch have to wade through foam to rescue a trapped crew member.
18	3	"Episode 3"	Gerry Mill	Anita Bronson	14 October 1990	N/A
The watch tackle a fire at a block of flats started by drug dealers; when the dealer comes down the ladder he kicks the police officer and flees; Colin gives chase with Bayleaf running behind; Colin gets kicked in the face and Bayleaf gets slashed in the cheek; a furious Bayleaf warns Colin never to run off alone again; Bayleaf considers a transfer to Croydon to be closer to Clare, but Tate will not give him the necessary form; Duffy smears lipstick on Hallam's underwear and when Sandra discovers it, she makes him sleep on the sofa; the watch soon get to hear about it and continually sing "there's lipstick all over my y-fronts" and "have you seen the y-front man?". The watch are ordered to a terrible train derailment; Colin is distraught when a woman has to have her legs amputated.
19	4	"Episode 4"	John Reardon	Anita Bronson	21 October 1990	N/A
A man goes into a DHSS building and sets himself alight; Sicknote organises a campaign to save the local city farm; a trench collapses at a construction site; Malcolm helps save a man who is buried and is recommended for a commendation; Technique is called to a meeting at HQ, where he learns that the Brigade has been spying on him for suspected moonlighting, and is thrown out of the service; meanwhile Bayleaf moonlights as a painter and decorator; Beattie persuades George to join a dancing class.
20	5	"Episode 5"	Keith Washington	Anita Bronson	28 October 1990	N/A
A high rise window cleaner is trapped in a cradle and Sicknote has to be lowered down to him on a rope; George meets Kelly at his dance class; Malcolm discovers that the man whose life he saved is brain damaged; Bulstrode and Tate work together to scupper Bayleaf's plans to transfer; Bulstrode gives Bayleaf an ultimatum: either he take over as Bulstrode's official driver or remain at Blackwall; Tate is promoted to temporary station commander; Sicknote is temporarily promoted to mess manager and Maggie walks out within minutes; Technique wins a bodybuilding contest and stands up Marion; Colin sparks a row in the pub and Technique butts him, and Jaffa punches Technique.
21	6	"Episode 6"	Gerry Mill	David Humphries	4 November 1990	N/A
Kate Stevens joins the watch as a probationary fire fighter and immediately distinguishes herself by rescuing a baby from a car on fire; Colin turns up at Kate's house, but flees when she and her friends offer him a threesome; George takes part in a dancing contest with Kelly; Tate invites Tony and Jenny to dinner, but Tony is annoyed when Tate suggests he be used in a campaign to recruit more ethnic minority fire fighters; a very large man has a heart attack and blue watch have to move him with the aid of a hydraulic platform; Tate is relieved to learn that his promotion to station commander will not be made permanent.
22	7	"Episode 7"	John Reardon	Anita Bronson	11 November 1990	N/A
Tate helps release a man whose head is stuck between two iron bars; Colin is sent to buy the watch a Chinese takeaway but messes up the order and they only get rice; Kevin's dad is released from prison and Kevin persuades Marion to let him stay, but he steals money from her; Blue Watch attend a fire at a hospital; Bayleaf receives his 20-year service medal.
23	8	"Episode 8"	Keith Washington	David Humphries	18 November 1990	N/A
Malcolm receives his commendation for bravery; Blue Watch have to deal with a flooded funeral parlour; George, Tony and Kevin play a prank on Colin by having Kevin leap out of a floating coffin; Tate fails a routine medical and is forced to take early retirement; to George's horror, Bayleaf has a video of George and Kelly dancing, and shows it to the watch.

=== Series 4 (1991) ===
No. overall	No. in series	Title	Directed by	Written by	Original release date	UK viewers (millions)
24	1	"Episode 1"	Gerry Mill	David Humphries	29 September 1991	N/A
A light aircraft carrying two businessmen crashes into a warehouse in central London after its engine failed; in the process it breaks in half and sets fire to a van. Hallam is acting Station Officer and applies for the full-time job but does not get it; Tony has left the brigade to run a boutique with Jenny; Sicknote decides to stand for election as a local councillor for the Green Party; Kate's ex-boyfriend Martin turns up at her house; a man gets trapped under the floorboards while doing DIY in his house; much to Kate's annoyance, her friend invites Martin to stay; Malcolm takes on a new tenant, Helen; Colin accidentally sends the pump to the wrong address; as a result of this and Colin's youthful exuberance, Hallam decides that Colin's probationary period must be extended.
25	2	"Episode 2"	John Reardon	David Humphries	6 October 1991	N/A
Colin's mum arrives at the station and gives Hallam a piece of her mind for leaving Colin on probation; George is marrying Kelly; Blue Watch attends a fire at a recording studio; then it is called to rescue a horse stuck in a pond; Hallam hires Bayleaf, George and Kevin to renovate his kitchen; Sandra returns to find a big hole in the wall; George's wedding ends in a punch-up and he knocks out Kelly's brothers; Sicknote wins the council election.
26	3	"Episode 3"	Gerry Mill	David Humphries	13 October 1991	N/A
A stranger arrives at Blackwall. It turns out to be Nick Georgiadis, the new station officer. Nick has already been nicknamed Zorba and soon makes his mark on the Watch, demanding strict adherence to the rules, and is unimpressed by some of their lax ways. The Watch initially doubts his firefighting credentials, but he proves them wrong by taking part in a drill, and Malcolm discovers that Nick in fact has a highly impressive service record. Blue Watch deals with a gas explosion in a sewer. Kevin confronts Rick about hitting his sister but is overpowered by Rick's friends and beaten up. Kevin and Nick clash when Kevin questions Nick's order that he is unfit for duty. Blue Watch are called to help a Chinese woman whose thumbs are stuck in the bath taps.
27	4	"Episode 4"	Mike Vardy	Tony Hoare	20 October 1991	N/A
When an elderly couple try to put out a fire in their old sofa, young neighbour Zoe ends up calling the fire brigade. Mabel refuses to leave without her pet budgie and Colin, who takes a shine to Zoe, volunteers to rescue it. As Colin tries to resuscitate the dead bird, he gives it a blast of air from his BA and sends the corpse through an open window. To Mabel and Zoe waiting outside, it looks like the bird has flown away. Colin is Zoe's hero and so he asks her out. The pump is sent on standby into the Kent countryside and, despite getting the appliance stuck in a ditch, they assist in fighting a barn blaze. Attempting to remove a valuable tractor from the inferno, George merely succeeds in demolishing half of the barn. Green Councillor Bert Quigley has started holding surgeries in his living room. Besieged by pensioners, Jean gets tired with making cups of tea, until a drunken Irishman comes in with a serious wound, mistaking it for a doctors surgery.
28	5	"Episode 5"	John Reardon	Anita Bronson	27 October 1991	N/A
A coach driver carrying young school children on a trip to London is alerted by a child that danger is ahead, and had to swerve off to the side of the road to avoid colliding with a lorry. The coach overturns and rolls down the motorway embankment, leaving the driver, a teacher and one boy dead, with others screaming in agony. Rejoining the Watch is Firefighter Stuart "Recall" MacKenzie, so nicknamed for his photographic memory, while Colin's chosen venue for his date with Zoe is a home game at Millwall FC. He cannot understand why she does not answer the phone the next day. Blue Watch is called out to a horrific accident in a block of flats where a young boy is decapitated by a lift counterweight after messing around on top of a lift with his mate. The blood-soaked body is discovered at the bottom of the lift shaft. Kevin reveals his feelings for Marion but finds she is still seeing Technique. Drunk and upset, he turns up at Nick's birthday party, held at Uncle Demitri's restaurant. Kevin tries to pick up Nick's teenage sister but becomes abusive. Nick sees it as a family insult and floors Kevin with a right-hander.
29	6	"Episode 6"	Gerry Mill	Anita Bronson	3 November 1991	N/A
Two boys break into a boat moored in a marina and remove the cooking gas cylinder to sniff it. Alerted by an alarm, a security guard goes to investigate. One youth escapes, but the other is still sniffing when the guard turns on the light, causing a huge explosion. When the Watch arrives, several boats are on fire. Kevin spots the security guard in the freezing water and dives in without a line. Nick then has to dive in to rescue Kevin and sees the mutilated body of the second youth floating alongside them. George learns that he is going to be a father but Nick is fed up with the constant pressure for him to marry cousin Ariadne. Colin and his uncle Jaffa take their revenge on Technique, who has sold them a dud window-cleaning round. Marion finally realises Technique is a rat and tries to make it up with Kevin. When he will not have anything to do with her, she takes pills and vodka in a suicide attempt and is rushed to hospital.
30	7	"Episode 7"	John Reardon	David Humphries	10 November 1991	N/A
A city yuppie, much the worse for drinking, accidentally drops his Filofax onto the tracks at Aldwych tube station. He climbs down to retrieve the scattered contents, only to end up being knocked over by an incoming train. Blue Watch arrives to find the man still alive and remove him by jacking the carriage up. Riddled with guilt at her suicide attempt, Kevin visits Marion. The Watch patches it up and agree that Kevin should move in. Kate is becoming disenchanted with Jeff, the firefighter she met in Kent, but passes her end-of-probation exam. A hotel goes up in flames and Colin becomes a hero by saving a colleague when the stairs collapse. Nick is suspicious about the hotel's safety and, on confronting the manager, discovers that alterations made since the building's fire certificate was issued had turned the place into a death trap. And when a constituent chains herself to Sicknote's front gate, he decides he's had enough of being a councillor.
31	8	"Episode 8"	Gerry Mill	Tony Hoare	17 November 1991	N/A
A builder uses a pneumatic drill as he tries to clear a load of hard concrete from the drum of his cement lorry before it sets. However, a huge chunk of concrete falls onto him, trapping him. His young son, playing nearby, calls the Brigade who realise that he has to be got out quickly before more concrete falls down. Just as he is released, he dies. Touched to learn that Recall's son Jamie has cystic fibrosis, Bayleaf has organised the Watch to take part in a charity pram race to raise enough money for the family to go to Walt Disney World in Florida. It is a great success, raising over £1,000 and Maggie's daughter has managed to get free tickets for the flight. Later, in the station mess, Colin reveals he has never been outside of Britain and Nick decides the Watch should go on a trip across the English Channel to France which he leaves Sicknote to organise. Meanwhile, George has to fight off Kelly's mum, Lil who tries to seduce him.
32	9	"Episode 9"	Keith Washington	Anita Bronson	24 November 1991	N/A
There is a surge of excitement when a report of a massive warehouse fire is released on the teleprinter. The scale of the incident is worsening and Nick, Kate and Recall are sent into a basement to find the night security man. Josie and two other members of Charlton Blue Watch are back up. The security man is found on the second floor and Nick's team are called back. But as they return, an explosion rips through the basement where Recall is pinned by a huge wooden beam with his air supply running low. At ground level, Bayleaf locates a hydrant under a lorry. He succeeds in attaching a standpipe to the hydrant by crawling underneath it but needs Hallam's help to turn it on. Suddenly the building's wall collapses, burying the two under an avalanche of rubble. Meanwhile, Josie's team reaches Nick, Kate and Recall and gives them much needed air. At last the vibraphone locates life in the rubble, and Hallam is dragged out alive, but Bayleaf is still missing.
33	10	"Episode 10"	Keith Washington	Anita Bronson	1 December 1991	18.86
The warehouse shout continues and a tabloid journalist worms her way into Sandra's kitchen where the anxious wives and partners have gathered. Clare, whose firefighter husband died in a road traffic accident, faints when she is told Bayleaf is missing presumed dead. At the shout, nearly all personnel are involved with clearing the rubble, with Blue Watch and Josie working frantically. At last, the vibraphone picks up something underneath the lorry and Kevin and Colin crawl under to jack it up. They find Bayleaf unconscious but alive and drag him out to waiting paramedics. In hospital, Bayleaf has a head injury and a broken leg. Hallam's physical health is fine but he is showing the classic symptoms of post-traumatic stress disorder and has not kept any appointments with the brigade counsellor. Unlike Bayleaf, he was conscious while buried. Hallam insists he is fit for work, but Nick refuses to let him back until he has had counselling. At this, Hallam has a nervous breakdown in front of Nick and his wife. Nick, shocked to see his Sub Officer break down like that, quietly leaves him sobbing in Sandra's arms.

=== Series 5 (1992) ===
No. overall	No. in series	Title	Directed by	Written by	Original release date	UK viewers (millions)
34	1	"Episode 1"	John Reardon	David Humphries	27 September 1992	N/A
John Hallam is finally receiving the counselling he needs. Nick, George, Kevin and Colin are checking the Surrey Quays Shopping Centre for fire safety precautions when the security guard tells them he has heard a rumour about a new fire station being built nearby, which could mean the permanent closure of Blackwall. Claire is visited by Bayleaf's ex-wife Karen who wants to take their daughter Melanie with her, but she wants to stay with her father. Karen threatens to have Mike in court about custody. Numerous fire engines are called to the Rotherhithe Tunnel where smoke is emanating from a ventilation shaft, but it turns out to be a tramp frying sausages on a barbecue. Paul talks Jean and Sicknote into taking part in Shakespeare's Richard III, while Malcolm takes Helen out on a shopping trip and George and Colin win some goldfish at a fairground. George, Kevin and Bayleaf go to meet Recall and his family at the airport after their trip to Disney World. Recall has brought a plastic toy fireman from the USA that will serve as their mascot. When Hallam returns to duty, he is stunned by the odd arrangement of a little pond and the plastic fireman in front of the fire station to cheer the place up. Instead of being amused, Nick is angry and orders them to get rid of it. A group of youths cause carnage at the fairground and deliberately crashed the Ferris Wheel ride by jamming the drive mechanism with an iron bar, causing people to become trapped in crushed metal cages and are left dangling in mid-air. Blue Watch are called out to rescue them.
35	2	"Episode 2"	Gerry Mill	David Humphries	4 October 1992	N/A
Blue Watch gets a videotape in the mail informing them that their mascot 'Bulstrode' has been kidnapped. Instead of paying ransom they invade Borough Street Fire Station at night and Malcolm steals the dentures of their Station Officer while he is asleep. Later, Blue Watch is called to a car fire on a residential street where a toddler is trapped. Blue Watch unfortunately arrives too late to rescue the child and Nick laments on unsafe materials used in car manufacturing. POPs is auditioning for Richard III. After securing the male lead for himself, Sicknote casts a newcomer named Cynthia as his partner, leaving Jean fuming with jealousy. Colin learns that he may stay in the fire brigade despite his earlier bungles. A plumber accidentally sets the attic of a house on fire and Blue Watch is called to put it out. After the shift, Colin has a big party to celebrate his success, but his Mum is not pleased when she catches him and Zoe snogging in the Garden Shed.
36	3	"Episode 3"	John Reardon	Roger Marshall	11 October 1992	N/A
A young girl has gone missing in an old flour mill and the brigade is called to find her and get her out. Kate, the slimmest of the watch, is sent through the ventilation system and finally finds the girl stuck under debris in a room. A hole is cut into the outside wall to get in there and free her. Elsewhere, a teenage boy has cracked up after too many rows with his parents and too many computer games. He climbs up a crane. Bayleaf is sent up to talk him out of his suicide plans At the end of this long Sunday, the girl is freed from the warehouse, but in a cruel set of circumstances, the helicopter airlifting the girl to hospital makes the boy confuse his video game world with the real world, and he hallucinates a jet fighter and tries to take off in it to attack the helicopter, and he falls from the crane to his death, much to Bayleaf's shock.
37	4	"Episode 4"	Gerry Mill	Anita Bronson	18 October 1992	
George's brother-in-law Cyril is threatened by debt collectors but Beattie does not get an explanation. Bayleaf goes to talk to Karen, who remains stubborn about wanting custody of Melanie. A well-dressed woman has apparently locked herself out of her house and sweet-talks Nick into breaking in for her. The men are all charmed by her, only Kate is suspicious, but nobody listens to her. Despite the lady's calls to be careful, Recall manages to destroy half of the bathroom when he climbs through the window. In the evening, a furious stranger comes to the fire station demanding to see the station officer. He yells at Nick that the "charming lady" was in fact his ex-wife whom he had tried to keep out of the house by changing the locks on the doors. Now she has run off with half of the household. Nick and the boys realise they have been had and that Kate was right all along. During rehearsals for Richard III, Jean and Cynthia continually bicker. George and Kelly are just visiting when the debt collectors appear at Beattie's place. George drives them away for the time being and offers Beattie to move in with them. Sicknote takes Cynthia home after the rehearsal and kisses her, but she runs off. The next morning, Karen and her Spanish boyfriend come to Melanie's school and lure her away. At the fire station, Kevin asks Nick about a possible promotion and Nick suggests an Advanced Firefighting course. Thick fog causes a serious traffic accident on a motorway in Kent and a huge pile-up. A man is trapped in a burning car. Blue Watch manage to get through to the site of the accident and Nick sees a lorry with gas bottles that could possibly explode and later on do so. The firefighters try to support the many victims, while Nick and Hallam wonder about onlookers and reckless drivers. On coming home, Bayleaf realises that Karen has kidnapped Melanie.
38	5	"Episode 5"	Gerry Mill	Anita Bronson	25 October 1992	N/A
Nick is invited to a posh dinner at the chamber of commerce and goes on a furious rant about unsafe cars and reckless drivers recalling the huge motorway crash they had encountered in graphic detail, much to the hosts' (who happen to be local car manufacturers) annoyance. Kate is at a party where a bloke chats her up. George and Kelly suffer from Beattie's many noisy kids, while Malcolm has a furious row with Helen at a pub over refusing to go to Brussels with her. He pleads with someone in the ladies' but it turns out that it was not Helen who was inside... Bayleaf learns from Karen's mother that they have gone to Spain with Melanie. Kate has a one-night stand, but wakes up full of regrets in the morning. Blue Watch is called to a house fire in the living room, where the stereo has caught fire. Colin rescues the fish who were on dry land after the aquarium burst and puts them into another aquarium without thinking. The little girl who owns the fish gets the shock of her life when she sees her fish have been butchered by the piranhas who live in the other aquarium... Kelly is fed up with Beattie's kids and asks George to throw them out again. When he refuses, she moves out and back in with her own parents. Doctors suggest a transplant procedure for Jamie to Recall and Laura. Nick finds that he has made the local headlines with his furious speech against the motor trade and gets a grilling from ACO Bulstrode and goes to see the widow of the man who had died in the crash. Her grief makes him crumble at last. Jean is fuming with jealousy when Sicknote and Cynthia kiss rather too passionately during rehearsals. Zoe is happy when Colin asks her out but instead of a posh restaurant she expected, he takes her to a greasy Fish & Chip Van, She asks him to move in with her, but Colin cannot stand up to his bossy mother. Kate worries about being pregnant after her one night stand with Don and during a shout at a burning warehouse she absent-mindedly turns off the sprinkler system and endangers Kevin and Malcolm's lives and Nick furiously reprimands her.
39	6	"Episode 6"	James Hazeldine	David Humphries	1 November 1992	N/A
An illegal garage where stolen cars are modified and get new colours is set on fire with a guy trapped inside. Kate has gone to see her doctor and arrives late for duty, missing the firefighters who are just rushing off to the garage fire. A hose gets tangled up and George pulls at it, causing a shelf to collapse and bury Kevin beneath. He is freed, but the trapped guy gets fried. Sicknote goes to visit Cynthia at home. Helen complains about Malcolm choosing the Brigade over their relationship. Kelly secretly hopes that George will come and take her home, but her mother sends her to her room like a little child and tells George on the front door to get lost. Zoe is furious that Colin still has not talked to his Mum about moving out. In the end, both Colin and George are forgiven. Sicknote and Cynthia start rehearsing and end up kissing in earnest. After Kate's refusal to get in touch with Don, her flatmate Mary interferes and goes to talk to him. Kate is not happy when she comes home to find him on the couch, knowing about her pregnancy. Bayleaf receives a postcard from Melanie, confirming that she has been taken to Spain by her mother. Malcolm has been lumbered with showing a Wartime Fireman around the Brigade museum but finds himself enjoying listening to the old timer's story and it helps him come to a decision. The Watch are stunned when Malcolm comes to Blackwall to hand in his Resignation and clear his locker. They do not get a chance to say a proper goodbye to him as they are on duty and Malcolm will be in Brussels by the time they finish. Malcolm collects his things and leaves quietly, never to return.
40	7	"Episode 7"	John Reardon	David Humphries	8 November 1992	N/A
Colin has once more chickened out, much to Zoe's dismay, while everyone teases him at the station. Nick tells Kevin that he has been accepted for a course in survival training. Then Blue Watch is called to free a man whose Houdini act has gone wrong. Kevin and Marion have a row about the course he wants to attend, leaving her behind. Bayleaf and Claire hire a private investigator to find Melanie in Spain. Jamie is in hospital to have a lung and heart transplant and Hallam and Sandra come to visit Recall and Laura. Don talks Kate into keeping the baby instead of having an abortion. Blue Watch starts training for a charity basketball match. Colin accidentally knocks Hallam out, who is in a filthy mood for the rest of the day. Nick hears about Bayleaf's problem to raise the cash for the private eye and gives him a personal cheque. An old man working on the Thames Barrier has suffered a heart attack. Firefighters and paramedics have a hard time to get him out of the bowels of the huge barrier's machinery and lift him up. Meanwhile, Kelly has contractions and is taken to hospital. On returning to the station from the barrier, Maggie tells George that she has called and he rushes off at once. At the hospital, Kelly finally rebels against her domineering mother and is re-united with George. The whole watch comes to congratulate them after the shift. Colin finally moves in with Zoe.
41	8	"Episode 8"	Keith Washington	Roger Marshall	15 November 1992	N/A
Blue Watch is still playing basketball and Nick brings them their own team shirts – "Blackwall Blaze". Hallam tries to teach tactics, but the guys prefer chatting. Crooks throw a molotov cocktail into a pub, which catches fire. Upstairs, people are trapped in their flats. Hallam has a hard time saving himself by lifting himself up through a window in the ceiling, dropping his BA and helmet despite the smoke to be lighter. Blackwall Blaze is ready for their first Basketball match, but the opponents turn out to be a lot taller – and better. Colin gets knocked on his nose and drops out, so that coach Hallam has to join himself, but to no avail. Blue Watch suffers a miserable defeat (losing 14 to 76). Hallam suggests to go boozing in a strip club to cheer themselves up, but the club has been closed and the pier is deserted. The mood is as gloomy as the weather – their day out turns into another rescue when they see a girl about to jump into the sea from the pier. Recall and Hallam heroically jump into the sea to save her. In the end, they find an open pub, where they get drinks and flirt with women. Hallam, Sicknote and Bayleaf, racked by private problems are glum and get drunk. Jaffa first urges them to go home, but loses his mind over a woman and is later found in their camper with his trousers down, much to Hallam's disgust. Bayleaf cries about Melanie on Sicknote's shoulder. Colin is so drunk that he has the courage to phone Zoe in London and propose to her – while the others laugh themselves silly. Zoe, who's with Kelly, is beside herself with joy. Hallam's blissful memories of their night out are shattered when Sandra finds a picture of the "Heroic Firemen" in the morning paper – showing them surrounded by women and appearing to be having fun.
42	9	"Episode 9"	Keith Washington	David Humphries	22 November 1992	N/A
Kelly and George are enjoying some domestic happiness with their baby Sean. Recall and Laura are relieved when Jamie can leave the hospital after the successful transplants. A burglar trying to enter a wine store in "mission impossible" manner slips, and is left dangling in mid-air for the rest of the night. Hallam, Recall and Bayleaf engineer a prank on Colin writing a fake memo he is to copy for the area command headquarters. Over-zealous Colin hands the memo to the postman who takes it away before Hallam can stop him. He and Bayleaf bicker about the prank going wrong and Zorba tells them that whatever the prank is, they can take the flak themselves. The private eye tells Bayleaf and Claire that he has found Melanie. Sicknote comes home to find Cynthia with Jean making friends – when they get a minute on their own, he tells her to leave him alone. Kate tells John that she has decided not to keep the baby in order to continue her career at the fire brigade. ACO Bulstrode sees Nick about the odd memo, but while he can take a joke and laugh about the prank, Nick is furious. Colin hears from another fireman who brings a fresh oxygen bottle that he has been on the butt end of the watch's practical jokes once more and is upset. Kevin goes on his survival training. He is pleased to see Marion coming to visit him at the hotel, but she has only come to tell him it is over. Having lost Vaseline years ago, she could not bear the thought of losing another firefighting boyfriend, so she quits. A huge gas-filled pig explodes in a nightclub, causing a big fire and panic among the young clubbers. As the crowd tries to get out of the burning building, Kate is knocked to the ground and trampled on. Back at the fire station, she realises that she has lost the baby.
43	10	"Episode 10"	John Reardon	Anita Bronson	29 November 1992	N/A
Colin and Zoe are preparing their wedding day. Bayleaf goes to Spain and yells at the lazy, sunbathing private eye to help him find Melanie. Two crooks fiddle with electric gadgets in a hotel room, causing a huge explosion and a big crash on the street. Colin finds the remains of the electric gear in the hotel room and takes them outside. Meanwhile, Sicknote realises that the walls start crumbling and shouts at everyone to quickly leave the hotel. A helpful policeman tells Colin that he is in fact holding a bomb and orders him to stand very still. Colin is scared stiff and shaking too much to put the bomb down safely. Nick has to help him. An expert later explains that the bomb was not live yet and nothing could have happened, so Colin wet himself for nothing. Bayleaf finally sees Melanie, who's being used as a servant girl in a cafe. She manages to steal away and he tells her to quickly fetch her passport and return. They manage to escape and he takes her home to England. Colin refuses to tell the others where he and Zoe plan to spend their wedding night to avoid having a prank played on them. On his stag night, Sicknote tries his skills at Karaoke. Kate meanwhile decides to give Don a chance despite losing his baby and invites him to Colin's wedding. The lads tie a totally drunk Colin to a lamp post in the pouring rain until he tells them the hotel's name. Zoe makes a wonderful appearance at the church in an ancient fire engine, while Blue Watch have donned their parade uniforms. The wedding is only disturbed by the loud wailing of Colin's Mum. When Zoe throws the bridal bouquet, Don catches it, making Kate blush. George, Recall, Sicknote and Kevin come to the Clarendon hotel, asking for the Parrishes. But only a couple named Smith have booked in for the night. Suspecting a fake name, the guys barge into the hotel room with a lot of noise, scaring the living daylights out of the poor couple in the room – who are strangers indeed. Colin and Zoe are meanwhile enjoying an undisturbed wedding night at the Tower Thistle hotel. During the next duty, Nick hands over a postcard from Colin, explaining the hoax. The series ends with Blackwall Station's future in serious doubt and Hallam making a passionate speech to save it.

=== Series 6 (1993) ===
No. overall	No. in series	Title	Directed by	Written by	Original release date	UK viewers (millions)
44	1	"Episode 1"	Gerry Mill	David Humphries	3 October 1993	N/A
Blue Watch deals with a flooded house. The watch has two new members: Leading Fireman Geoffrey Pearce, a replacement for the recently departed Malcolm Cross, and Fireman Billy Ray. Pearce is already irritating the watch with his pedantic and bossy ways. Kate has transferred to Wimbledon. The campaign to save Blackwall Fire station has been successful, and the station has been refurbished. An elderly lady and her granddaughter are trapped in a house fire. Hallam is attached to the Fire Investigation Unit and Pearce is promoted to temporary sub officer. Sicknote is in Richard III and attracts unwanted attention from his co-star Cynthia. Kevin wins a greyhound in a poker game. Bayleaf, Billy, Recall and Colin all buy a stake in the dog. While racing to a shout, Bayleaf crashes the fire engine into another car.
45	2	"Episode 2"	James Hazeldine	Tony Hoare	10 October 1993	N/A
Blue Watch deals with a fire at an Asian family's flat. Hallam arrives with the F.I.U. and suspects arson but it turns out to be accidental. Sicknote is still being pursued by Cynthia and Jean grows suspicious of his behaviour. Jaffa persuades George to box for the brigade against a police boxer. Billy buys a hearse to use as a passion wagon. A woman handcuffs her son to a bench near a canal and then commits suicide. Bayleaf gets a threatening phone call from a relative of the people injured in the accident. Colin's mum turns up at Zoe's catering class and causes a scene.
46	3	"Episode 3"	Keith Washington	David Humphries	17 October 1993	N/A
An elderly woman accidentally releases the parking brake, causing her daughter's car to suddenly run away and crash through the brick wall of the Sainsbury's multistorey car park in Woolwich, hanging several feet above the ground. She is left dangling with the front wheels in the air, but Blue Watch comes to secure the car and help the woman to crawl out of the car through the rear window. Hallam and Jonah are meanwhile investigating a fire elsewhere and Laura talks to Sandra about her worries for Jamie. Nick's crew goes to investigate a call about smoke issuing from a building, but they only find a group of homeless people who have lit camp fires outside against the cold. Bayleaf asks Pearce to help him in court, because he had been in the front seat next to him and can testify that he had seen the motorcyclist coming out of nowhere. But Pearce insists that he has seen nothing and cannot help him. Sicknote and Billy can barely prevent Bayleaf from jumping at his throat. When Kevin leaves the station after duty, he finds his father waiting for him, having served his time in jail (again). Jean accuses Sicknote bluntly of an affair with Cynthia. Nick takes Diana to his flat and she stays overnight. A boy who cannot properly handle the forklift in a refrigerated warehouse, causes a crash and gets buried under the fork lift. He accidentally broke a gas pipe, and Blue Watch have to put on BA to enter the warehouse and free the trapped boy out. George wins his boxing match and the whole watch cheers him.
47	4	"Episode 4"	Gerry Mill	Tony Hoare	24 October 1993	N/A
ACO Bulstrode calls Nick to his office to explain about the crash of a fire appliance with a motorcycle driver. Kevin tells George that his dad has cancer. A man comes to the station with his little boy who has swallowed something and is close to choking. Nick rescues him with a huge pat on the back, making him cough up whatever was stuck in his throat. Patti Pearce arrives in London to settle down with her husband. Billy takes his newest girlfriend into his passion wagon. Bayleaf keeps suffering from nightmares after the accident. Colin tries to talk Zoë into having kids, but she insists on having her own career. Dossers have hidden in an old cellar where they get high on glue and cause an explosion. Blue Watch is called to put the fire out and Hallam joins them with Jonah and the F.I.U. While Bayleaf tries to evacuate a couple from a high window, one slips and falls off the ladder. Nick runs through the flames to save a burning dosser and crashes through the floor into the basement with him. Instead of taking charge, acting sub officer Pearce runs to help Nick, causing Blue Watch to act disorganised and without coordination. When Hallam arrives at the scene, he shouts at Pearce for his cock-up and takes charge himself, sending the others to evacuate Nick. Diana is just visiting Nick in hospital, when Hallam and Sicknote arrive, seeing him with his new girlfriend. They tell him about Pearce's blunder and do nothing to cheer him up. In the supermarket Claire is attacked by the woman whose husband was knocked over by Bayleaf, bitterly asking how she could be with such a reckless man. Bayleaf will have to go to court to defend himself against the charge of reckless driving. Hallam is not too happy when he comes home and finds the Pearces in his living room with Sandra. The whole watch comes to watch Richard III. Jean catches Sicknote and Cynthia in the dressing-room. Nick gets a shock when he comes to visit Diana at home for the first time to meet her parents and her father turns out to be ACO Bulstrode.
48	5	"Episode 5"	Keith Washington	David Humphries	31 October 1993	N/A
Sicknote is forced to spend the night on the couch with a black eye. At the fire station an inquiry about the bungled shout at the warehouse is held, but Pearce talks himself out of every responsibility. Bulstrode is not pleased that he blames everyone and everything except himself, realising that they have landed themselves with a nice troublemaker in Blackwall. Scaffolding collapses at a building site, trapping people and a whole bus underneath. George evacuates a guy down a ladder, Kevin and Billy have to climb into the rubble where they manage to free a young woman. Nick is surprised when he gets a phone call from Kevin, who is deep inside the tangled masses of scaffolding in a shop. The guys are rewarded for their dangerous situation underneath the rubble, when they find the missing baby and get her out. Afterwards Nick and Hallam have a chat about their new leading firefighter. Kevin takes his parents to the race track. Sicknote comes home only to realise that Jean has walked out on him and stays with her sister now. Nick complains to Diana about her father being his boss, but she destroys his doubts. A new firefighter, young black Sally Reid, arrives at Blackwall, almost knocking over Sicknote and Pearce when she drives into the station rather recklessly. Just as the alarm goes off, Recall receives a phone call that Jamie has been taken to hospital. While everyone else goes on the shout, Bayleaf takes Recall to the hospital.
49	6	"Episode 6"	John Reardon	Tony Hoare	7 November 1993	N/A
Jamie is in hospital, with Recall and Laura worrying at his bedside. Patti complains about the house Geoff has rented, demanding a bigger place where she can show off. Billy gets George to take part in a boxing match. On a shout, the men play a prank on newcomer Sally, making her think that the pump has been stolen, so that she is forced to run to the next police station. But she gets her revenge, when a police car stops the fire appliance on the street, asking Hallam and the crew to identify themselves as the pump in question has been reported stolen. Finally Sally creeps out of the police car, making clear that she has caught the guys out. Sandra is not happy, when Poison Pearce and his wife Patti invite themselves over for tea – just as Jean turns up as well. Unaware of Patti overhearing them in the doorway, she tells Sandra she is escaping Bert and plans to divorce him after his infidelity. Next morning at the station Sicknote is baffled to hear the gossip from Pearce and shouts at Hallam for offering Jean sanctuary. Hallam is fuming when he realises Pearce has spread the gossip. Kevin warns George that his next boxing match may be fixed. During night shift, Blue Watch is called to a deserted swimming pool. Two kids had broken in and one is stuck with his foot in the pool, close to drowning. Sally proves her swimming skills by jumping into the water at once to support him. Colin's mum and Zoë have another fight about him. Billy is told that George must lose the boxing match, because there is much money riding on his opponent. "The Terminator". He is lots stronger anyway and George gets an ugly thrashing that leaves Kelly in tears of despair. Recall and Laura suffer when Jamie has to undergo another operation.
50	7	"Episode 7"	Gerry Mill	David Humphries	14 November 1993	N/A
Billy has received his share of the fixed boxing match and being the honest soul he is, he goes to offer George his share. But George is angry when he learns that the match had been fixed and Billy actually won money from his loss. When he turns up for duty with his battered face, Nick gives him a reprimand and sends him home. Sally reluctantly allows her boyfriend Eddie to borrow her car while she is on duty. During night shift Blue Watch have to free a couple who got stuck in their car in a very peculiar position after the guy slipped a disc. They have to cut the roof off to free them. Billy gets into trouble when he refuses an order by Nick and teases Kevin almost into a fist fight. Patti goes to visit Jean in an attempt to make friends, but Jean does not appreciate her sticking her nose into other people's business. Sally is mad, when she leaves the fire station after the shift and finds that Eddie has not returned the car. He turns up with the car and flowers after four days. On a long walk, Bayleaf finally proposes to Claire; she accepts. Blue Watch is just extinguishing a small fire, when young joyriders get chased by the police and crash the car into a petrol tanker truck, causing a huge blaze and explosion at a petrol station. Hallam bravely darts through the flames to help two guys out of the station shop. Leaking fuel causes the fire to spread to the used cars parking area next door, igniting several cars. Nick drives the pump towards a roof to help people escape from the first floor onto the roof of the pump. Sally helps to evacuate the rest via the long turnable ladder. The whole area is covered in foam, making it look like after a heavy snowstorm.
51	8	"Episode 8"	John Reardon	Tony Hoare	21 November 1993	N/A
Maggie has gone to Thailand where she is enjoying herself with a Thai toyboy. Billy introduces Bayleaf to his Nan, who has raised him. Sally allows Eddie to stay at her place but resents his overtures. Hallam is forced to give Geoff lifts to the station and back home, after the Pearces moved into the neighbourhood. Recall returns to duty now that Jamie is improving. Eddie is just about to borrow Sally's car without asking, when George catches him and Sally angrily sends him away. Two boys play a prank on the manageress of a laundrette by locking her in the office and setting the machines to produce huge masses of foam. Billy and Colin wade through the foam in BA to free her. Hallam and Sandra are driven to hiding behind the sofa, when the Pearces come for yet another visit. Three drunk football fans crash a party and throw a molotov cocktail into the house. The banners that decorated the hall, cause the fire to spread everywhere very quickly. A guy has a fatal fall from a flagpole. Sicknote climbs over the roof to save a woman and her baby who were stuck in an attic room. Jean, who is staying with Sandra, sees his heroic rescue operation on TV and is so moved that she decides to return home – telling a surprised Sicknote that he is "on probation" for the time being. Kevin, Billy, George and Sally go to the dog races but much to Kevin's surprised his so far very successful dog suddenly loses. He begins to smell a scheme. Bayleaf has to go to court about the crash between his pump and the motorcycle.
52	9	"Episode 9"	Keith Washington	David Humphries	28 November 1993	N/A
Jean is treating Sicknote extra-nice, happy to be home. Kevin hears from a kennel lad about the fixed races and goes to thump Charlie. Blue Watch is called to a burning shed, where many fireworks are stored. They explode, causing a serious threat to the firefighters, while the guilty pranksters only laugh. On returning to the station, Kevin learns that his father has died in hospital. He goes to support his Mum. In court, the car driver gives a tearful testimony, but finally admits that he saw the motorbike and Bayleaf had had no chance to avoid it. Bayleaf is found not guilty of reckless driving and Blue Watch goes to celebrate at his house. Nick goes to see Diana, but finds a stranger in her flat, erupts in jealousy and leaves again. The Pearces have prepared a house-warming party, but nobody comes except some spooky characters from Bristol. Kevin gets a box from his dead father containing much money – all the money he made from the fixed dog races. He breaks down in tears. Blue Watch are baffled when Maggie appears at Bayleaf's party with her Thai toyboy.
53	10	"Episode 10"	James Hazeldine	David Humphries	5 December 1993	N/A
Patti is mad that nobody came to the party. Hallam is defrosting his car, while he has another row with Sandra and Pearce appears for his lift to the station. He is pissed off when one by one the firefighters come to apologise for not coming to the party, offering one or other lame excuse. Kevin attends his father's funeral. Blue Watch is called to help a worker who is squashed under a heavy block. Billy talks to him (he used to be at the same school as Billy) and tries to encourage him, but the man dies and the older watch members have to support Billy to overcome the shock and accept death as part of their job. Sandra cannot avoid Patti in a self-service restaurant and tells her that Hallam may take a civilian job. Kevin returns the race dog to his previous owner. Nick is just talking to Billy about the incident, when Diana appears at the station. But Nick is stubborn and tells her that it is over. Sally takes Recall's elder son Ben to the swimming pool. Hallam goes to talk to Jonah about a job in a security firm, but he is not happy with himself. Nick sends Colin on a course with the airport fire brigade at Stansted Airport and he enjoys himself with the modern special appliances there. Blue Watch is called to a seemingly small fire. Colin and Sally have to inspect the premises and happen onto an ancient theatre room where squatters have taken up residence. Colin fiddles with the curtains on the stage and a beam of lights crashes down on him. Nick takes him to the hospital. Zoë breaks down in tears, when she learns from Nick that Colin's legs are crushed and he will never walk again, but she keeps a brave face when she goes to see Colin.

=== Series 7 (1994) ===
No. overall	No. in series	Title	Directed by	Written by	Original release date	UK viewers (millions)
54	1	"Episode 1"	Gerry Mill	David Humphries	4 September 1994	N/A
Blue Watch is happy with its new undress uniforms and Maggie reads a letter from Colin to everyone. Although he is now walking again after his accident, he's been declared "permanently unfit" and as a result will never return to Blackwall or active duty again. Blue Watch is devastated. A lorry driver crashes into a wall, which collapses and buries a kid with his bike beneath. Blue Watch is called to free the driver and the kid. Bayleaf loses his temper when another fireman takes the mickey out of him because of his accidents. Laura catches Ben who returns from school extremely early, but he refuses explanations and leaves again with his friends. Ariadne and Petros distribute invitations to their wedding at Dimitri's restaurant, much to Nick's displeasure. Kelly finds a rat (in fact a mouse) in the kitchen and yells at George that they must move because she cannot raise kids in their awful place. Sandra wants Hallam to take a civilian job in an office. She later tells Patti about her hopes for him and she likes the idea. But when Hallam is shown around his future office by ex-Station Officer Jonah, he is horrified at the thought of being trapped in the confined office. Nick confronts Bayleaf over his loss of temper with the other firefighter. During night shift, Blue Watch is called to tackle a huge blaze at the local prison – two brothers have cooked up a scheme to free one of them from jail. To escape in the mayhem, he knocks out Bayleaf and steals his uniform, but a prison guard catches him. The brother in the escape car panics and races off, followed by police. He dies in a car crash, his brother is returned to prison.
55	2	"Episode 2"	Gerry Mill	Simon Sharkey	11 September 1994	N/A
ACO Bulstrode visits Nick about the prison incident and the stolen uniform, wondering why it is always Bayleaf who gets into such trouble. Bayleaf himself is pissed off that even his kids make fun of his accident. George and Kelly complain about the state of their flat to the landlord, but he says it is their own fault. Blue Watch represents the fire brigade in a charity action for the Children's Hospital Fund at a supermarket, where they have to build little houses in time. Billy had told Pearce that it would be fancy dressing, so he is the laughing stock when he appears in a chicken's costume. Patti's misplaced nun costume does not stop her from talking to Nick about Hallam's job offer and hopes for Geoff's promotion, taking Nick by surprise. Sicknote takes Jean on a romantic weekend in the country, but spoils her hopes for romance, when he meets an old guy called Douglas who gets him drunk first and takes him golfing the next day. Nick makes Hallam talk about the job, but he says that he will not quit the brigade. Maggie tells Bayleaf that she has invited a friend from Thailand – unaware that he has brought the whole family. During night shift, Blue Watch is called out to tackle a fire in a library, where a blind woman is trapped in the cellar. Ariadne tells Nick that she would cancel the wedding to Petros if he would be willing to make a commitment and marry her.
56	3	"Episode 3"	John Reardon	David Humphries	18 September 1994	N/A
Hallam asks Nick who told him about the job in the first place and he admits that it was Patti. Blue Watch's old enemy Scase appears, newly promoted to District Officer. He requests a drill and catches Billy with missing personal items and Sicknote forgetting to book Sally out. Nick knows that he's only looking for trouble, but reprimands Billy and Sicknote nonetheless, reminding them how important it is to follow procedures. Sally goes to Rotherhithe as stand-by driver. She gets along fine with the firefighters, but the female Sub Officer has no sense of humour and tells her that she only joined the fire brigade to get the men's attention, which will not work with her. Blue Watch is then called out to help rescue people from smashed, wrecked cars in a terrible traffic accident in Thamesmead. They realise that a heavily pregnant woman travelling to the hospital is involved and cannot safely be removed in time. Pearce has to assist her to help deliver the baby inside the car. Sandra happens onto Patti in the supermarket. Patti asks how she feels about Hallam declining the job, taking her by surprise. At home, Sandra yells at Hallam for not telling her about his decision. Pearce tells Patti about the baby, but she will not have any of it. Laura is visited by Ben's teacher and realises that he is permanently skiving school. Kevin moves in with Billy for a while, Sally goes swimming on the brigade team and George is involved in a haulage to earn some extra money. It ends in disaster when a piano drops onto the street from the fourth floor.
57	4	"Episode 4"	John Reardon	Simon Sharkey	25 September 1994	N/A
A mentally disturbed kid named Donald hangs out at the station, much to Pearce's dismay. Bayleaf explains that he means no harm and only admires the fire brigade, Billy sends him to buy some papers. Scase appears again during an exercise to check Blue Watch's books. Kevin flirts with Sally and Bayleaf tells George that he considers leaving after all his accidents. The exercise is interrupted by the alarm bell – an elderly woman has called the brigade because she fears that her neighbour got trapped in a tank. An army tank, that is. A group of kids, including Ben, raid a little newsagents' store. Kevin and Billy go out with two girls, one of which gets into a drunk stupor. Kevin is kind enough to take her home and gets yelled at by her father. Patti calls Hallam to check the fuses after she was left in the dark and makes a pass at him. He is saved by Pearce's return. Ariadne and Nick have a secret meeting in the church and she urges him to make a decision, but he's stubborn. During night shift, one crew has to go on stand-by at another station. Recall and Sally talk about his problems with Ben, Pearce confesses to Hallam that Patti has always been chasing after other men and that she was also the reason for them leaving Bristol, after she made a pass at the station officer and the gossip got around. They are called out later to rescue a policeman who got stuck in a muddy pool with his motorcycle after chasing a group of young yobs. Laura reports Ben missing.
58	5	"Episode 5"	James Hazeldine	Jane Hollowood	2 October 1994	N/A
Billy tries to play a prank on Pearce by pouring a lot of salt into his milk, but he does not seem to notice, much to Billy's and Kevin's shock and surprise. They are called out to a small fire in a pillar box and Pearce tells off the kids for destroying the letters for no reason. Recall asks the whole watch to distribute search notices about Ben. Even Donald wants to help finding him. Patti barges in on Hallam with the excuse to borrow some eggs though she only wants to seduce him again. Claire learns that she has inherited a lot of money. Patti upsets Laura even further by tactlessly suggesting that Ben could be injured in hospital somewhere. Sicknote goes golfing with his new friend Douglas and his mates, but he vanishes halfway through the game, feeling stupid. Ariadne marries Petros despite her feelings for Nick. While asking around for Ben, Donald gets beaten up by some young thugs. Recall and Laura go searching for Ben in the West End. Meanwhile, Blue Watch has to tackle a huge blaze at a futuristic games' club. Ben, who is roaming Soho, is terrified by a man who seems to be following him and seeks refuge at Soho Fire Station where he is finally reunited with his parents.
59	6	"Episode 6"	Gerry Mill	Bryan Elsley	9 October 1994	N/A
A mentally disturbed kid named Donald hangs out at the station, much to Pearce's dismay. Bayleaf explains that he means no harm and only admires the fire brigade, Billy sends him to buy some papers. Scase appears again during an exercise to check Blue Watch's 6 Sandra catches Hallam on the phone to Patti and grows suspicious. Billy allows Donald to sit at the wheel of the pump ladder and switch the blue lights on, but then the alarm goes off and Pearce catches them out, yelling at Donald to get lost. Desolate and hurt, Donald seeks refuge in an old factory, where he has built a model fire station. Meanwhile, Blue Watch arrives at a City Farm, where a smith has set the straw on fire. They tackle the blaze and evacuate the animals. Sicknote rescues a scruffy, extremely ugly mongrel and decides to adopt it. Billy jokes about Kevin and Sally, so that Kevin pushes him. Hallam interrupts them and sends Billy to evacuate the pigs, but he falls into the mud while chasing after them and the others hose him down. Sandra confides in Jean about her worries about Hallam and Patti. Pearce meanwhile decides to go home by bus instead of getting a lift from Hallam like always. Jean is horrified when Sicknote appears with the mongrel and resolutely locks him up in the garden shed. George goes to sell chips and hot dogs from a van, but he cannot handle a group of teenagers and the van goes up in flames. Red Watch appears to tackle the blaze and George is the laughing stock. Sandra and Hallam have a row about Patti and Sandra decides to go and tell her to keep her hands off her husband. In the resulting quarrel, Pearce takes Hallam's side, saying that he believes him that nothing happened, but Patti does not budge. Maggie's friend prepares a Chinese dinner for Blue Watch during the next shift. Pearce catches Donald at the wheel of the pump ladder and yells at him once more, telling him to never set foot in the station again. Bayleaf tries to smooth things, but Donalds runs away. He goes playing with his model fire station, but the little fire gets out of hand and sets the old factory on fire. Blue Watch comes to tackle the blaze. Pearce goes to save Donald from the roof, but he's too terrified to let him come near, steps back and falls to his death in the yard. Sally is woken up in the middle of the night by police who are investigating her boyfriend's drug-trafficking. Next day she is so tired that she blows the swimming competition for the brigade. Nick goes to see Diana Bulstrode, but she tells him that he only loves Ariadne. Kevin goes to visit Sally to comfort her and they kiss.
60	7	"Episode 7"	Gerry Mill	David Humphries	16 October 1994	N/A
Bayleaf and Claire go to take a look at the restaurant they would like to buy. Nick and his crew go on a fire safety inspection to a restaurant, which has been turned into a nightclub. Billy manages to chat up one of the strippers, Lauren. Sally rejects Kevin's new advances and he vents his anger by attacking Billy over a stupid remark. Jean declares war on the mongrel and tells Sicknote to take him to the station with him for the next night shift, so that she can sleep again. Hallam tries to make up with Pearce about the Patti-incident. Kevin moves into a house boat and Billy comes to visit him with Lauren. During the next night shift, Blue Watch is called to a burning house, where kids have set up an illegal radio station on the roof. Two of them are now trapped in a lift. The firefighters have to tackle the blaze and fight off the young yobs, who hinder their work and take things away from the pumps. When they return to the fire station, Nick finds Sicknote's dog in the cellar, where it has ripped an old uniform to shreds.
61	8	"Episode 8"	John Reardon	Simon Sharkey	23 October 1994	N/A
Hallam is sent to train on the fire brigade river boat on the Thames and Pearce takes over as Sub. Jaffa attacks Sicknote about fleas in the station and Nick has a go at him about the dog. The whole watch has to clean the station from attic to cellar as Nick fears another surprise visit from Scase. Down in the cellar, Billy finds some old uniforms. Blue Watch is called to a block of flats, where a young woman has cracked up and locked her husband and child on the balcony. She attacks Recall and Sally with a knife when they enter the flat, but they can overpower her. Bayleaf signs the contract to buy the restaurant and George starts another job as watchman in a theatre. Sandra, sick of Hallam's attitude, has a job interview herself. Billy is preparing another prank on Pearce and pours foam pulver into the outside toilet, but it almost turns into disaster when Scase appears at the station and inspects the toilet, which is blocked. When he leaves, Billy sends Pearce to check on the blocked toilet to get the flush working and he unblocks it, only to be covered in a cloud of foam, much to the watch's amusement. A fire and explosion in a van on the Woolwich Ferry brings Blue Watch together with Hallam and the river boat crew. Uncle Yanni tells Nick to leave Ariadne alone now that she is a married woman. Sally's boyfriend turns up at her flat and they have an argument just as Kevin appears. Kevin punches him, thinking that he's doing Sally a favour, but she yells at him.
62	9	"Episode 9"	Geoff Harris	Jane Hollowood	30 October 1994	N/A
Bayleaf and Claire start working on the restaurant. Nick seeks help with Dimitri, but he also tells him to leave Ariadne alone. After the shift, Billy takes the old uniforms, but he is caught by Pearce who is immediately suspicious. Kevin invites everybody to a party on his new boat, but Sally refuses – officially because she has got swimming training, but in truth because she is still angry with him. George goes to work in the theatre, where he saves the Russian prima ballerina Larissa from a little blaze. The rest goes to Kevin's party, but he's not chuffed when – uninvited – the Pearces turn up as well. When the party is over, Kevin cleans the boat and is attacked by two thugs who beat him up. At the station Kevin accuses Sally, but she says she has nothing to do with it. Dimitri thwarts Nick's attempts to get in touch with Ariadne. Fake firefighters sell smoke-detectors to pensioners and run off with the money. Boys are playing in an old water tower and one falls down into a very deep well. Nick is rigged up in rope and let down into the well, hanging upside-down to rescue him. After this heroic effort, even DO Scase is willing to pay him respect.
63	10	"Episode 10"	John Reardon	Roger Marshall	6 November 1994	N/A
Road workers discover a bomb near the fire station, while Nick's crew is just putting out a small fire in a rubbish bin. Sally, who's on standby in the pump receives a call about the bomb. Blue Watch has to evacuate the street around the fire station and are refused entry, while army experts come to defuse the bomb and take residence in the station. Meanwhile, a careless car driver knocks over a young school girl, and furious parents stage a protest on the street against crazy drivers. Blue Watch has to watch how the bomb experts are working and do not know what to do. One crew goes to have lunch at another fire station where the food is miserable and the firefighters obnoxious. The other crew is just about to have lunch at a fast food joint, causing raised eyebrows in their uniforms, when they are called to a block of flats where a guy is trapped in a lift. When they want to go up in the other lift, it also stops working. The others have to come and get them all out of the lifts. While Blackwall is on stand-by at another station, they are called to a burning flat, where a young woman passed out after burning some letters from her ex-lover in the dustbin. Hallam's crew cannot proceed, because they are stuck in the street where the mothers are protesting against reckless car drivers, so Nick's crew has to tackle the blaze on their own. He risks his life and for once has to be grateful to Pearce who rescues him. Hallam gets into a furious argument with the leader of the protest, but not to much avail. At least they can all return to Blackwall Fire Station. While Pearce and Sicknote muse about the bomb and the damage it could have done, Billy scares them to death by throwing a dustbin onto the ground next to them. When they enter the station, they realise that the army guys have devoured all their supplies in the kitchen, but before they have time to take this in, the alarm is sounded yet again and they race off to a fire in a rubbish dump.
64	11	"Episode 11"	Gerry Mill	David Humphries	13 November 1994	N/A
Sicknote starts worrying about his balding, but Jean only laughs at him. Charisma returns to Blackwall after 5 years and is joyfully greeted by his old friends. Nick, though, is rather stunned about his glib remarks. George asks Jaffa to take over driving the appliance for him so that he can start working at the theatre in time. The fake firefighters are caught out by an old lady whose grandson is in the brigade and recognises the old uniforms. Blue Watch is just doing a ladder drill, when the alarm bell goes off. Nick's crew leaves while the others continue the exercise on their own. They enter the kitchen in BA and frighten Maggie, who accidentally kicks a hose. The jet goes off and sprays the whole kitchen. Sandra's new boss makes a pass at her and Claire goes investigating about bouncing cheques. George leaves the station early and Jaffa takes over for him, just as Blue Watch is called to a huge explosion. A gas yard is on fire and all the gas cylinders explode like missiles, setting houses on fire and making the work dangerous. Just as Jaffa is calling for reinforcement, one gas cylinder hits the fire engine which explodes in a huge fireball.
65	12	"Episode 12"	Gerry Mill	David Humphries	20 November 1994	16.81
The gas explosions continue from the previous episode. Jaffa has been badly burned but is still alive. Scase and Nick are at loggerheads again, when Scase cancels the helicopter Nick had requested for Jaffa's transport. But Nick later apologises and says that Scase was right – no helicopter could have landed with all the debris flying around like missiles. Hallam and Sicknote try to evacuate a worker from the burning gas depot and get almost blown away by a new explosion. George hears about the huge blaze in the theatre and phones the station, just as Blue Watch returns. He is shocked to hear about Jaffa's accident and goes to see him in the hospital. Jaffa's wife tries to convince him that it was his own decision, but George feels shitty, knowing that he should have been in Jaffa's place. Kevin wants to visit George at home, but only finds Kelly who says that she simply cannot get through to him at the moment. Meanwhile, George tells Larissa about the whole thing and she comforts him. Sandra slaps her boss when he tries to make another pass at her, knowing that it will cost her her job. Nick learns that Ariadne has given up her job at a nursery school, but Yanni refuses to give an explanation. Charisma gives Sicknote a lotion for new hair growth. Nick gets a memo about the fake firefighters. Pearce goes to tell him about seeing Billy with the old uniforms. Billy gets summoned to Nick's office and is told that he will be sacked if the con men are caught.
66	13	"Episode 13"	Keith Washington	Simon Sharkey	27 November 1994	N/A
George is still racked with guilt about Jaffa's accident, but S.O. Suffolk tries to cheer him up as well. Sicknote wears a cap all of a sudden, but he only reveals to Charisma that his lotion has caused an ugly rash on his head. Nick and Pearce attend a coroner's inquiry about Donald's death at the blaze. Pearce has to admit that he was too rude to the boy and even feels guilty, but the coroner states that the incident will be treated as a sad accident. Pearce is truly humbled when Donald's mother tells him how fond he was of the brigade and gives him a drawing he had made of Blackwall. Meanwhile, Blue Watch is called to a flat, where a guy is stuck in the heating with his arm. His flat is full of yukky animals, causing Bayleaf to flee. He is called back to assist after Billy obviously "collapsed", but when he opens the medicine bag, a huge spider crawls out, shocking him, while everyone laughs. Sally goes out with her brother and after some chat, he tells her that their father is really ill and would like to see her again. Billy gets the old uniforms back from the guys to whom he lent them, unaware of their mischievous plans. While the watch exercises with dummies and first aid gear, he secretly returns the uniforms and tells Nick. Nick is frustrated about Ariadne's disappearance and quarrels with Hallam to vent his anger. Blue Watch is called to a car accident, where a guy has been run through by a pole. On returning Nick learns that there has been a call from Cyprus for him.
67	14	"Episode 14"	James Hazeldine	Simon Sharkey	11 December 1994	N/A
Jean is just taking a parcel from the postman, when Sicknote returns from night shift and snatches it away from her. It turns out to be a hair piece. Sally visits her father in Wembley. Larissa says goodbye to George and gives him a signed programme of the ballet company. She invites him to visit her at the hotel later, but he resists temptation and returns home to Kelly. Nick gets a phone call from Ariadne who's been taken to Cyprus by Petros. He agrees to fly to Cyprus and fetch her home. Bayleaf and Claire want to confront Trevor, but he's vanished. Suffolk catches Sicknote with the hair piece in the bathroom and warns Blue Watch. They all act as if they do not notice – much to Sicknote's disappointment. Ariadne and Nick escape from Cyprus, chased by Petros and his friends. Scase appears at the fire station about the fake firefighters incident, but everyone keeps mum. Scase summons Pearce to the station office, but he refuses to say something. Unbeknown of this, Billy later attacks him for talking to Scase. Pearce loses his temper with Billy and they almost fight, but Hallam interrupts them. On returning home, George finds Kelly in tears. She has found the signed programme and accuses him of infidelity, but he swears that there was nothing between him and Larissa. Charisma joins Kevin and his friends for a card game, Nick and Ariadne come home.
68	15	"Episode 15"	Gerry Poulson	David Humphries	18 December 1994	N/A
Nick returns to the station and reprimands Billy and Pearce about the fighting. A man sets the kitchen and himself on fire in a room full of glue tins. George overreacts when trying to save him as if trying to compensate for Jaffa's accident. Pearce had seen that Sandra is on job-search again and not surprisingly, Sandra meets Patti at the job centre. Uncle Yanni and his friends appear at the station to confront Nick about Ariadne in front of the whole watch. Nick then visits ACO Bulstrode. Scase appears at the office, trying to pick on Nick, but Bulstrode takes his side and has a go at Scase. Sally tells Nick that she considers a transfer to the Northwest to be closer to her ill father. The fire brigade holds a charity raft race for burn victims in hideous costumes. Nick appears in public with Ariadne for the first time, causing gossip. George is called away from the race after the first leg, because Kelly has gone to hospital to have their baby. He appears at the hospital in his silly pirate costume and punches Kelly's brother who makes stupid remarks. The others get into a sea fight with officers, using fire extinguishers and flour bombs. Scase rips off Sicknote's hair piece by accident, which terrifies him so much that the officers lose. Ariadne tells Nick that she is pregnant.

=== Series 8 (1995) ===
No. overall	No. in series	Title	Directed by	Written by	Original release date	UK viewers (millions)
69	1	"Episode 1"	Keith Washington	David Humphries	3 September 1995	N/A
A double-decker bus is hijacked by a group of young, drunken punks who argued furiously with the driver over paying the fares, drove it away and crashed the bus into a low bridge at a railway station. Rescuing people from the smashed upper deck takes time. During the next night shift, Recall is kidnapped and gets his beard shaved off. Blue Watch is then called to a fire at a stripclub, where they can just about rescue a young black stripper trapped in her dressing room.
70	2	"Episode 2"	Gerry Mill	Simon J. Sharkey	10 September 1995	N/A
One crew is called to a posh office, where a worker got stuck in the photocopy machine after trying to photocopy his buttocks. Laura mentions to Recall that she'd like to return to Scotland. Hallam realises that Patti has walked out on Pearce, but he refuses to talk. George tries to repair a leak in the attic and crashes through the living room ceiling, just as Kelly's parents turn up. Ariadne realises that Nick has not told anybody about their relationship or her pregnancy and is upset that he does not socialize with the watch and treats her like a secret that must be hidden. Sicknote gets into an argument with a big-headed worker who parks in front of his house, waking him up every night with false car alarms. Consequently, he sleeps through the alarm during night shifts. Blue Watch is called to a fire in a supermarket. Hallam and Billy get locked inside a storage room and nobody hears them for Sicknote, who's on stand-by in the pump, is talking to cops outside. The fire is in the wine + spirit storage room, causing explosions.
71	3	"Episode 3"	Gerry Mill	David Humphries	17 September 1995	N/A
One crew is called to an old woman's house as her cat is trapped inside the chimney. The row between Sicknote and the car parker escalates when he rides over his bike and Sicknote in turn scratches the car. Kevin and Billy go out to a posh casino with Lauren and another girl, but Kevin has only bad luck, gets into a quarrel and thrown out. George and Kelly finally move to another flat in a rather shabby estate. Blue Watch gets involved in a football game for the fire brigade with DO Scase as the referee and Pearce as a linesman, upsetting the others. During the next shift, they are called to a flat that caught fire after a furious jealousy row and they have to evacuate a nude guy who was trapped in his bathroom. Blue Watch is asked to donate blood for the local hospital and Billy and the others cook up a prank on Sicknote who's scared stiff of the blood donation.
72	4	"Episode 4"	Gerry Poulson	Simon J. Sharkey	24 September 1995	N/A
Sandra is worried about Patti's absence and goes to check. She finds the house empty, but sees a freshly dug patch of earth in the back garden. She tells Hallam that she thinks Geoff has murdered Patti. Lauren goes to see Kevin and just as she is leaving, Billy appears. They have a row about her. DO Scase comes to see Nick about an official complaint about Sicknote damaging the car. A protester gets trapped high up on an industrial chimney and they have to rescue him despite the risk of everything falling apart. Hallam spreads the rumour of Pearce having murdered Patti and buried her in the garden around the watch. During night shift, Blue Watch is called to a suspected fire on a cemetery and Sicknote almost wets himself when he has to walk around the spooky graveyard with Pearce. They happen onto a Satanic mass and decide to leave them alone. Recall and Laura go out to restaurant while Claire babysits their sons. Jamie has an attack and is taken to hospital.
73	5	"Episode 5"	James Hazeldine	David Humphries	1 October 1995	N/A
The paranoia among Blue Watch increases as the murder suspicions grow. They are called to a scrapyard, where an excavator has gone on the loose and trapped workers under demolished cars. George helps his Pakistani neighbour after racist youths attack him and grows more and more uneasy about the estate where they are living now. Laura suggests to move to Scotland as she wants to be with her family, but Recall wants to stay with the brigade in London. Billy quarrels with Lauren over her occupation as stripper. A young woman docks her boat next to Kevin's boat and he likes her at once. Sicknote sees a tandem in his bike shop and gets an idea. During the next night shift Blue Watch is called to a fire in a Chinese restaurant. Pearce is sent to evacuate a group of drunken women from one room, but they mistake him for the stripper they were actually expecting.
74	6	"Episode 6"	Gerry Mill	Simon J. Sharkey	8 October 1995	N/A
Sicknote gets another reprimand for his behaviour with the car alarm bloke, Nick explains that he has to keep up the honour of the fire brigade even off-duty. As the paranoia of the watch reaches a new height, Pearce demands an explanation for their bizarre behaviour which results in Billy asking him if he is a murderer. Pearce angrily walks out, just as the alarm is sounded for a shout and as such does not join them. Nick organises a search for Pearce when they get back to the station, but finds him waiting in the office. Nick gets to hear the full story, reprimands Pearce for dereliction of duty and then the rest of the watch for having got so carried away with their nonsense as to actually suspect a watch member of murder. Kevin's no-good brother Mickey shows up on his boat, begging for money. During night shift, a fire breaks out in a primary school hall during a children's musical rehearsal, and they have to evacuate the kids. Ariadne, sick of her family's attitude to her relationship with Nick, goes to talk to Uncle Yanni. After a furious row, she falls down some stairs.
75	7	"Episode 7"	Gerry Poulson	Simon J. Sharkey	15 October 1995	N/A
Ariadne is in a coma after her fall, but the baby is unharmed. Nick stays with her all the time. Jean causes a car crash and as the haulage company takes her and the damaged car away, it catches fire, so she directs it to the fire station, where Sicknote is stunned. Kevin tries to get rid of Mickey, who's only causing trouble. Sandra goes on holiday, leaving Hallam behind on his own. With Nick gone, they get a standby replacement for the next shift, Vernon "Clingfilm" Chivers, who makes friends with Pearce. Blue Watch is called to a house fire and when they return they happen onto DO Scase and the new ACO Baxter. Scase overdoes his rude behaviour like always and, as a result, gets an icy reprimand from Baxter, who hints that Scase's place in the modern Brigade may be on the line. Nick and Ariadne's child is delivered by caesarean section, but Nick is devastated to learn that Ariadne died during the operation.
76	8	"Episode 8"	Gerry Mill	David Humphries	29 October 1995	N/A
Nick gets some days off in mourning, and Sandra leaves on her holiday. A nervous school pupil who is supposed to do an exam leaves the classroom and maliciously breaks the fire alarm to interrupt the exam. Hallam furiously lectures the pupils on the dangers of false alarms and hoax calls to emergency services. Mickey appears at the fire station in search of Kevin. He finds Maggie on her own and knocks her down to steal her purse. DO Quinn appears after Scase has got sacked, he's a friend of Nick and tries to comfort him over Ariadne's death. Kevin suspects Mickey of having attacked Maggie and gives him a trashing. Hallam meets Jenny, a beautiful student who wants to interview him about the work of the fire brigade. Sicknote buys the tandem to get Jean to share his passion, especially after her car crash. She is not too happy. Nick attends to Ariadne's funeral. Her parents wonder what he will do with the baby, Costas. Blue Watch is called to a huge warehouse fire, where Billy loses balance and slams into a large tank of caustic soda.
77	9	"Episode 9"	Gerry Mill	Simon J. Sharkey	5 November 1995	N/A
The warehouse fire from the previous episode continues. Billy is rescued and taken to hospital and is lucky to not receive any permanent scarring. George and Kelly have finally found a decent house and move again. Nick decides to keep Costas with him and not give him up to foster parents. Billy decides to go in search of real mother, much to his Nan's distress. Kevin pours his heart out to Remy about Mickey's attack on Maggie and she suggests that he returns her stolen ring quietly, so that it appears as if she had lost it. A letter bomb is sent to an animal-testing cosmetical plant, causing an explosion both in the company and in the van of the postman. Billy finally finds his Mum.
78	10	"Episode 10"	Keith Washington	David Humphries	12 November 1995	N/A
A bomb explodes in a pharmacy, causing a huge blaze. Nick, under much strain from his domestic affairs, has a row with Hallam. Billy talks to his mother for the first time. Kevin and Remy finally go to bed. Laura gives Recall an ultimatum, but he remains firm about not going to Scotland. Hallam and Jenny almost get to kissing, but Jenny sees Pearce spying on them through the door. Policemen appear at the fire station to talk to Kevin about the attack on Maggie and his brother, but he keeps mum.
79	11	"Episode 11"	Gerry Poulson	Simon J. Sharkey	19 November 1995	N/A
A worker is stuck high up on a tree, badly hurt from his chainsaw. Pearce and Clingfilm get him down. Mickey calls Kevin at the station. Pearce listens to his conversation and goes investigating on his own, talking to Maggie about the attacker. Billy's Mum explains to him why she walked out on his father ages ago and left him behind. Nick takes little Costas home from the hospital. Ariadne's parents are with him to take care of the baby when he goes to work. Sandra returns from her holidays. Maggie takes self-defence classes and meets Derek, the instructor and hair-dresser. Evgenia tries to persuade Nick to let them take Costas to Cyprus with them. Blue Watch gets to train on the fire brigade helicopter. George is scared of flying, but overcomes his fear. During night shift, Blue Watch is called to a huge blaze at a shabby council house.
80	12	"Episode 12"	Indra Bhose	David Humphries	26 November 1995	N/A
There's an investigation after the council house fire and DO Quinn decides to close down the house because fire precautions aren't met. Nick is upset, thinking of the tenants who have no other accommodation. Recall says goodbye to Laura and his sons, as they leave for Scotland. Jean has had enough and sells the tandem, much to Sicknote's dismay. Hallam quarrels with Sandra about her career and lack of time for him. He goes to see Jenny and sleeps with her. DO Quinn gets in trouble with the greedy landlord of the council house, who wants the house open to get his rent. Pearce suggests to Hallam to tell Nick about Mickey being the attacker. One crew is called to a house to get a stuck hamster out of a tuba. Nick calls Kevin to his office about Mickey. Blue Watch is called to a street, where smoke is coming out of a manhole. A cover explodes, throwing Bayleaf to the ground.
81	13	"Episode 13"	James Hazeldine	Simon J. Sharkey	3 December 1995	N/A
After the manhole cover missed him by inches, Bayleaf decides to quit the brigade and concentrate on the restaurant he is about to open with Claire. Blue Watch is called to a fire at a registry office. Remy and Kevin quarrel about Mickey, as she cannot understand why he protects his brother. Blue Watch is exercising, just as a motorbiker gets trapped under a heavy lorry. The local brigade gets stuck in the mud with their pump and Blue Watch is sent to help with the helicopter. A female firefighter can just about pull the trapped guy out before the lorry crashes down. Bayleaf announces to the watch that he is quitting, everyone is shocked. Hallam decides that he cannot see Jenny any more now that Sandra is back. Patti turns up again.
82	14	"Episode 14"	Alan Wareing	David Humphries	10 December 1995	N/A
Blue Watch is called to a fire, which turns out to be some weird gypsy funeral and they decide to leave them alone. Sandra wants to repair her marriage with Hallam. Nick relieves his heart to Quinn and explains that though he hates himself for it, he's going to send Costas to Cyprus with his grandparents so that he can concentrate on his work. Patti attempts to make up for running away, but Pearce is not convinced. Hallam says goodbye to Jenny to return to Sandra. Nick takes Costas and his grandparents to Heathrow and says goodbye to his son. George gets Jaffa a job in the local pub. Sicknote is forced to take care of Jean's gymnastics group and finishes off one of the pensioners. Blue Watch is called to a street, where a guy has cracked up and taken another one hostage in his car. He has poured petrol over them and threatens to blow them up. They cannot save the guys. Back at the station they play a goodbye-prank on Bayleaf, sending him into a heap of foam as he slides down the pole. Kevin gets a phone call from Remy after Mickey has invaded the boat.
83	15	"Episode 15"	Gerry Mill	David Humphries	17 December 1995	N/A
It turns out that Remy while staying on Kevin's boat had overpowered Kevin's brother Mickey, but Kevin is finally shocked enough to report him. He goes to apologise to Maggie about the attack. Kevin cracks up over his heartbreak and starts fighting at the pub. Billy and Recall take him back to his boat, where they find Remy's goodbye letter and realise she has moved on. Billy goes to check on Kevin the next day, but he only shouts at him to leave him alone. Policemen come to the station to inquire if Mickey was the guy that attacked Maggie, but everyone keeps mum to help Kevin. Everyone goes to celebrate the opening of Bayleaf's restaurant, save two. Pearce, bitter about Patti's betrayal, stays home and listens to his quiz on the radio; and Kevin, after too many heartbreaks and misfortunes, finally decides to follow Bayleaf's example and leave Blackwall for good.

=== Series 9 (1996–1997) ===
No. overall	No. in series	Title	Directed by	Written by	Original release date	UK viewers (millions)
84	1	"Episode 1"	John Reardon	Simon J. Sharkey	1 September 1996	12.21
Blue Watch are called to deal with an explosion at a house, but when they arrive they are not needed. The watch has a new member, the quiet and somewhat mysterious Jack Morgan. A mentally unstable man starts a fire at his ex-wife's house while she and their children are trapped inside. George is now running a boxing club. Sicknote receives his 20-year service medal, which he despondently regards as confirmation of old age. A car smashes through a restaurant window.
85	2	"Episode 2"	Alan Wareing	David Humphries	8 September 1996	12.72
Blue watch deal with a car fire. George leans on the handbrake and the car nearly rolls into the appliance. Pearce listens in as ADO Chapman tells Nick that Jack was present when a colleague died on a shout at his previous station. Sandra spots John talking to Jenny in a shopping centre and becomes suspicious. Billy falls out with his nan over him staying out at night. Pearce returns home to find Patti's sister and her husband removing her belongings from his house and angrily throws them out. A group of men try to rob a security van and torch it with a backpack flamethrower when they accidentally jam the doors.
86	3	"Episode 3"	Frank W. Smith	Neil McKay	15 September 1996	12.67
Nick goes to Cyprus to visit Evgenia and Costas. He wants to take them to London so that he can be with his son, but they oppose strongly. Jenny appears at the station to visit Hallam, causing the whole watch to stare and gossip. During a shout, George slams into a pothole on the road, getting the pump stuck. Jack is taken to a boxing match by Jaffa and they meet George who coaches one of the young boxers. Billy is offered a bed by Recall, whose family has gone to Scotland, but he (Recall) soon starts to regret his kindness. Sicknote decides to stage "Macbeth" at the prison. Pearce adopts a boxer dog named Bruno for company. On Cyprus, Nick gets into a fight with Ariadne's husband Petros about the boy's paternity. During their next night shift, Blue Watch are called to a swimming pool where a short-circuit and gas explosion caused a huge fire. Jack dives to save a young man who is trapped in a flooding room. Billy watches how he knocks the panicking man out to save him. Evgenia finally agrees to go to London with Nick and little Costas.
87	4	"Episode 4"	John Reardon	Simon J. Sharkey	22 September 1996	13.52
Billy tries to persuade Recall to go out with him. Nick returns to Blackwall just as Blue Watch is exercising with their BA gear. Jack gets into a fierce argument with a S.O. and then with Nick about his attitude and missing respect towards superiors. Maggie is taken out to a restaurant by Derek, where he proposes to her. But she confesses that she is still married and does not know what to do. Off-duty, Sicknote starts to audition people for the cast of "Macbeth". Billy meets a new girl, Stephanie, at a club, while Recall gets invited to a drink by a nasty woman and flees. Next morning he realises that Billy took the girl home – into the bed of his own son. He is furious. George and Kelly go to visit his sister Beattie who makes a living from operating a telephone sex line and refuses to reconcile with husband Cyril. Sandra catches Hallam on the phone to Jenny and brings him to confess his affair with the girl. Consequently, he is in a very foul mood and first shouts at Pearce when they go to the station together and then at Nick, when they meet in the station office. Blue Watch gets called to a huge blaze in a factory where a pop music video is just being shot. Jack is on BA control, but abandons his duties to save Recall who got injured and Nick gives him a furious reprimand.
88	5	"Episode 5"	John Reardon	Simon J. Sharkey	29 September 1996	15.72
The fire in the factory hall is still ravaging. Hallam and Pearce are high up on the metal walkways to save some kids who had watched the pop video from above. A piece of iron falls off, and Hallam slides down, unable to stop and crashes down several feet. He is taken to hospital. Recall is also forced to go to hospital and Laura comes from Scotland to visit him. Sandra also returns and learns that Hallam's chance for survival is 50–50. She breaks down in tears. The whole watch tries to cope with the accident but after returning from a shout, they learn that Hallam has died.
89	6	"Episode 6"	Gerry Poulson	Neil McKay	6 October 1996	15.97
Everyone is still trying to deal with their grief about Hallam's death, especially Pearce who saw him falling, but could not save him. Sicknote phones Bayleaf and asks him to come to London for the funeral. Blue Watch is called to a hospital, but it turns out to be a hoax call. Nick goes to talk to Sandra, who confesses that she wishes Pearce had died and not Hallam and does not want him to be one of the pallbearers. Nick understands, while it does nothing to make Pearce feel better about the whole thing. In the quietness of the station office, Jack tells him that he has also lost a colleague during a shout and knows how it feels. Everyone attends Hallam's funeral.
90	7	"Episode 7"	Gerry Poulson	Neil McKay	13 October 1996	16.56
Life in Blackwall goes back to normal. Evgenia sprains her ankle and Nick calls the station to say that he is staying at home to look after the baby, but Sicknote is horrified at the thought of Pearce being in charge, so he tells Jean to babysit so that Nick can come to work. Pearce hopes that he will be made Sub Officer now, but Nick tells him that DO Chapman has already appointed a new Sub. He watches from the station office window how Jack gives Pitbull a heavy punch. Blue Watch is called to the hospital again, but it is another hoax call. Nick checks the security guys who have filmed the area with their surveillance cameras. They catch the man who made the hoax calls and he says, that he was "bored". Nick reprimands Jack indirectly about punching Pitbull. Pearce thinks of selling the house to pay Patti off and get away from Blackwall. Jenny goes to talk to Sandra, taking the blame for the affair with Hallam. Stephen is sent to boarding school by Linda and her new husband. Kelly and George try to get Beattie and Cyril back together. During the next shift, Blue Watch has to fight a blaze after a TV imploded and rescue a paraplegic man from the upper floor.
91	8	"Episode 8"	Alan Wareing	Richard Zajdlic	27 October 1996	16.48
Blue Watch is in for a nice surprise, when the new Sub Officer turns out to be a woman – Carole Webb. Billy takes an immediate dislike to her and they bicker. Her crew gets called to a health club where women got trapped in their sauna. Carole sends Billy through the ventilation to open the door from inside and the women coo over him. Recall gets elected spokesman for the firefighters of Blackwall and Laura complains, that she continually feels second-best, threatening divorce. We meet Carole's husband Martin, a disabled ex-firefighter, who drinks too much and is upset about her career in the brigade. Sicknote rehearses Maggie and Derek in "Macbeth" and Jean encourages Maggie to get her divorce and grasp the chance with Derek. Cyril and a grease ball named Elkins propose a business deal to George to open a health club. Pearce questions Carole's experience on active duty and considers a transfer to be Sub Officer himself in the country. A bunch of joyriders set cars on fire and throw a molotov cocktail into a derelict building. When Blue Watch arrives at the scene, they interrupt their work and cause havoc. Jack and Recall are inside the building, when the hose goes dry after one yob disconnected it from the pump. Billy gets provoked into a fight, but Carole saves him.
92	9	"Episode 9"	Alan Wareing	David Humphries	3 November 1996	15.08
Nick lets Carole lead an exercise, but the men are not too impressed by her order to crawl from one pump to the other via the ladders. The watch is called to a big fire in a garage and Carole finally gets a chance to prove her worth by reanimating a hurt man with Nick's help. Stephen comes to visit his Dad at the fire station and Recall can just about manage to hide him from Chapman's sight. He tells Jack that he has run away from boarding school and Carole allows him to stay at the station for the day. Chapman asks Nick to attend a conference of the fire brigade. He is not happy but agrees, granting Carole the chance to really prove herself as Station Officer for a while. Jack brings Stephen back to Linda and they argue about boarding school. Jack kisses her, but they are interrupted by Stephen. Laura returns to Scotland and Recall knows deep inside that it is over. Blue Watch is called to a closed garage, where spillage made a dog sick and Nick asks his men to put on chemical protection suits just in case. But the owner of the garage appears and explains that it is nothing dangerous. The first performance of "Macbeth" starts and Maggie is half-dead with stage fright. Cyril shows George the building where he wants to install his gym.
93	10	"Episode 10"	Frank W. Smith	Simon J. Sharkey	10 November 1996	N/A
Jean gets an excellent review for "Macbeth", but Sicknote's direction is slagged off and he is upset. At the station, Carole takes charge as Station Officer. They get a new watch member, an Australian guy named Chris Newman, who gets nicknamed Skippy. Nick goes to attend the conference and meets the beautiful Dutch fire fighter Marianne. Carole and Jack get closer, but the alarm bell sends them to a shout. The pump gets stuck in a traffic jam, and Pearce, in the other pump, does not wait but goes up into a high building with his men to sort out the reported smoke. On arrival, Carole reprimands him, but the whole action is very disorganised and another S.O. reprimands them both. The smoke alarm turns out to be a barbecue on the roof. Pitbull abuses a black firefighter who's bringing the computer for the station. Pearce talks to the black guy who knows Carole and finds out about her husband. Jack tells Recall about the colleague who died on a shout. Skip goes out with Billy and Stephanie, but Billy gets overexcited when he sees Lauren with another man. Nick is just having a drink with Marianne, hoping to get to know her better, when ACO Baxter picks her up for dinner.
94	11	"Episode 11"	Frank W. Smith	Simon J. Sharkey	17 November 1996	14.04
Nick returns to Blackwall. Pearce tells him about Pitbull's racist abuse, about Carole's bungled shout and his wish to be Sub Officer. He also welcomes Skip, then reprimands Carole about the shout. The watch has a good laugh, when a cyclist comes to the station with his hands and his bum superglued to the handlebars and saddle of his bike, and needs to be cut off. Beattie and Kelly go to visit the new health club, while Billy visits Skip. During the next shift, Carole admits to the watch that her husband injured himself off-duty and not heroically on-duty as he always says. Blue Watch is called to assist the police, who are trying to save a young woman who intends to jump off a high building. Skip gets his chance to prove himself and scares everyone with his rather unorthodox but successful method. "Macbeth" is being staged in prison and Sicknote's friend, Paul, escapes in the van with the costumes and props. Sicknote wants to take him back, but he runs off. Jean urges him to tell the police, when the cops ring at their door, arresting them for assistance. During night shift, Jack tells Carole the whole story of how his friend died because a Station Officer gave wrong orders and his BA ran out of oxygen.
95	12	"Episode 12"	David Humphries	Indra Bhose	12 January 1997	12.11
Nick talks to Jack about his dangerous, uncontrolled temper and suggests to get help to deal with the memories that haunt him. The suicidal girl comes to the station to thank Skippy for saving her life and to give him her phone number. A taxi driver gets his hand stuck in the drain hole of a urinal in a public toilet after trying to retrieve his car keys that he accidentally dropped in, and Blue Watch has to pull him out. Jack meets the barmaid Nicky at Jaffa's pub. There will be an official investigation of Pitbull's racist abuse and Recall, as the firefighters's spokesman, agrees rather unwillingly to defend him. Pearce is terribly upset when Bruno goes missing and Clingfilm helps him to search the beast. Nick visits Ariadne's grave and talks to Yanni about life and love. George opens the fitness club with his business partners. Blue Watch is called to a house fire and when they are just finished, they see Clingfilm appearing in his camper, busy searching for Bruno, but Pearce does not really appreciate his efforts.
96	13	"Episode 13"	Indra Bhose	Simon J. Sharkey	19 January 1997	N/A
It is raining in Blackwall. Pearce thinks that the roof is leaking but actually it is Skip, lying on a pump, firing a watergun at him. Nick catches them out and tells them they will get a visitor from the Dutch fire brigade. Bruno is meanwhile found at Borough Street Fire Station, but they refuse to return the dog to Blackwall, so Jack engineers a trade against a jet. The Dutch visitor is of course Marianne and the guys are stunned. Chapman also arrives to greet her. The guys can just about hide Bruno from sight, but Nick catches them out later and furiously reprimands them. Blue Watch is called to help a guy whose legs got squashed under a fork-lift and Marianne joins in helping in her Dutch uniform. Jack gives Carole a lift home, making Gerry furious. But on the next morning, she sees from the fire station that he has spent the night with Nicky at the pub and is upset. Pitbull is officially disciplined by the fire brigade, but Recall makes a good speech in his defence and he may stay. Sicknote suggests a memorial plaque for John Hallam. Blue Watch has to put out a fire and save a man who is trapped under a lot of metal bars and stuff. Jack seizes the chance to steal the jet back from a Borough Street pump. Carole supports the trapped man, but he dies.
97	14	"Episode 14"	John Reardon	David Humphries	26 January 1997	N/A
Blue Watch is the first to get a new mustard coloured uniform that is based on the uniforms that American firefighters wear. At a big alarm in the London Arena, the other watches laugh at them in their new uniforms and Sicknote drives them off with a jet. Billy continues chasing Lauren and gets beaten up by her pimp, so he goes to stay with Skip to nurse his wounds. Carole spies on Jack and Nicky, while Marianne and Nick go out together. Jean and Sicknote visit Sandra to talk about the memorial. Pearce goes to a job interview for Sub Officer in Hampshire, still haunted by his memories of Hallam's death. When the next shift begins, Nick sends Billy home off-duty because of his bruised face. Recall asks for a longer holiday to go to Scotland and visit his family. Blue Watch is called to a huge blaze at a school fairground, where tents and stalls go up in flames after a man accidentally sets himself on fire when he was disturbed by an accident involving a stall collapsing.
98	15	"Episode 15"	John Reardon	Simon J. Sharkey	2 February 1997	N/A
Blue Watch is called to rescue a guy who is stuck on a tree. Skip finds out that he was leering at young sunbathing women and steals the film from the camera. The Health Club George had invested in catches fire. Kelly and Beattie are trapped in a room, but Blue Watch saves them. Nick suspects arson and George puts two and two together. He drums up support from Jack and Jaffa and they go to beat up Elkins, who caused the fire to claim the insurance. There's a heavy fight with him and his bodyguards. Pearce goes to talk to Sandra about Hallam's death and his intention to sell the house and transfer to Hampshire to get away. She sort of forgives him that he was the one who survived. Sicknote and ACO Baxter hold a speech in Hallam's memory as the memorial plaque is unveiled. Marianne returns to the Netherlands. The guys call each other into the station bathroom one by one, as Skip has developed the photos of the women. Jack almost gets to kiss Carole, but the alarm bell rings and interrupts them. As the fire engines rush along the motorway, they both get into a serious crash in which a long steel bar on a truck smashes through the windscreen of one fire engine, and the other fire engine swerved off the road, flipped into the air and rolled down the motorway embankment, ending the season on a cliffhanger.

=== Series 10 (1997–1998) ===
No. overall	No. in series	Title	Directed by	Written by	Original release date	UK viewers (millions)
99	1	"Episode 1"	Frank W. Smith	Simon J. Sharkey	14 September 1997	N/A
Following the crash of the two appliances and being declared unfit for active duty, Skip has returned to Perth to live with his sister. Blue Watch has to deal with a fire on a train, forcing Nick and Carole Webb to shut down a heritage railway line in Cambridgeshire. Nick finds a casualty between two coaches of the burning train; as he helps the casualty, another train slams into the one that is on fire and pushes all the coaches together. (Note: This was the first episode that was originally scheduled to be shown on the evening of Sunday 7 September but was postponed until the following Sunday, owing to coverage of the funeral of Diana, Princess of Wales, the previous day as ITV felt it would be too inappropriate to air the episode so soon after such an event, which meant that ITV showed Agatha Christie's Poirot: Hickory Dickory Dock in its place.)
100	2	"Episode 2"	Frank W. Smith	Simon J. Sharkey	28 September 1997	N/A
Nick manages to save himself and the casualty from being crushed when the trains crash from the previous episode. Recall admits his marriage to Laura is over; he heads off to Scotland to give the boys the rest of their belongings. Sicknote discovers he has psoriasis and is insulted when his doctor is shocked that he is allowed to drive a fire engine at "his age". George returns to work. Blue Watch are called to across the road to a fire in a flat where a little girl is locked inside. Carole returns home to realise Martin's trashed the house and taken all of his things. Billy's nan dies. (Note: This episode was also originally scheduled to be shown on the evening of Sunday, 21 September but like the first episode was also postponed until the following Sunday, this time however, ITV showed Alright on the Night's Cockup Trip in its place.)
101	3	"Episode 3"	Gerry Poulson	David Humphries	5 October 1997	N/A
Nick goes off to the Netherlands to join the Dutch fire brigade on his exchange visit, leaving Carole in charge and Geoff as acting Sub. Clingfilm once again joins Blue Watch to fill in for Billy, who is attending his nan's funeral. George, Billy, Recall, Jack and Gregg play a prank on Sicknote, making him think there is a ghost in the station. During the night shift someone sets Clingfilm's camper van on fire and Blue Watch are called to put it out. When he turns up, Clingfilm is devastated to see his home has been destroyed. He comes to the conclusion that the person who torched his camper was his estranged wife. Geoff tells him Recall's looking for a lodger and the rest of the watch encourage it; Recall reluctantly agrees.
102	4	"Episode 4"	Gerry Poulson	David Humphries	12 October 1997	N/A
Nick leaves the Netherlands and Marianne to return to Blackwall. Maggie receives a postcard from Derek informing her he has not yet found her husband, but he is continuing his search. Gregg arranges a date with Tiggy. Sandra and Geoff become friends. George and Kelly argue because she wants to go on holiday to Spain with Suzie, who offered to pay for her. Sicknote goes to see Asa and tries his metal detector, deciding that he is interested in getting one of his own. Billy turns up on duty with a drawing of Gregg that one of the students drew of him when he was modelling. Gregg buys it off him for £20 and tears it up. Blue Watch is called to a fire at a used car dealership and manage to save the owners and two paramedics.
103	5	"Episode 5"	John Reardon	Neil McKay	26 October 1997	N/A
Maggie and Sicknote rehearse for Jaffa's talent night. ADO Davies from Health and Safety arrives at Blackwall telling Nick they are planning an inspection on the station. Jack goes to Hilary's office where she is working late. They both have a drink and start to argue; the passion overwhelms them and they sleep together. Recall returns home to discover Clingfilm playing the tuba in his living room rehearsing for Jaffa's talent night. Gregg finally goes for a drink with Tiggy, but he's disappointed when all of her mates are there because he was under the impression that they were to be alone. Billy visits Gregg and asks about Tiggy, he overhears him singing and playing his guitar. Kelly leaves for her holiday in Spain. Billy sorts through all of his nan's possessions and finds a news article explaining how his father really died: being drunk in a bar and fighting in Germany. He then goes to confront his mother. Sicknote goes to the library to collect some books on Blackwall's history; when he gets there, they have all been taken. Later, it is revealed that Geoff is the one who has them; Sicknote is livid. Nick returns home to find Marianne; he is shocked.
104	6	"Episode 6"	John Reardon	Neil McKay	2 November 1997	N/A
Marianne does not get a very warm welcome off Evgenia. Sicknote finally gets himself a metal detector, much to Jean's dismay. Carole's friend Kim comes to visit from Liverpool. George is finding life difficult with Kelly not around and grows suspicious of a friend she has met named "Carlos". Geoff asks Sandra to Jaffa's charity event and she agrees. Billy gets to know his sister Jo. The watch is in shock when Geoff reveals he's taking Sandra to Jaffa's charity night. Gregg makes the local paper as "Antigone's mystery man". When he learns that she is the daughter of a local MP and former junior minister, he's not too impressed that Tiggy did not tell him herself. A photographer turns up at the station looking for Gregg. He's thrown out of the station by Jack; Nick reprimands Gregg for this as he and Billy are fighting while the photographer is taking pictures. Jaffa confronts Jack outside the station about the way he's treated Nicky.
105	7	"Episode 7"	Frank W. Smith	Fran Carroll	9 November 1997	N/A
Pitbull arrives at the station winding the watch up as usual so Sicknote squirts him with the hose. Marianne tries her best to be accepted by Evgenia, but because her efforts are not noticed, she turns up at the station after the shift; everyone is very surprised to see her. Nick, however, is not happy, as it will just cause gossip among the watch. Sicknote goes to his allotment and interests his neighbours with the metal detector. He lets one of them use it and he finds a ring and a grenade; he quickly throws the grenade at one of the sheds, which turns out to be his neighbours, who is not impressed, and it explodes. Sicknote is made the laughing stock of the Brigade once again. Carole is asked out to dinner by ADO Patrick Davies. The watch is called to a house fire where it is unable to save a little boy who is trapped. Kelly returns home from Spain. Carole goes to dinner with ADO Davies but realises it was a mistake and tells him before leaving; she then goes to the talent night where she and Jack have a moment and almost kiss but she restrains herself. Tiggy also turns up to the talent night, and she and Gregg finally kiss.
106	8	"Episode 8"	Douglas MacKinnon	Neil McKay	16 November 1997	N/A
Gregg and Billy play yet another prank on Sicknote, showering him in sprouts he blew up at the allotment. ADO Davies arrives to inspect the station. George feels that he's the reason the young boy died in the fire, as he took a wrong turn while driving the appliance. The watch is called to a fire at which an aggressive man is not too happy to see them, as he's the one who started the fire. He makes it clear the watch is not needed and is well within his rights, to the annoyance of a young mother who'd rung the brigade. Sicknote gets a letter from the council stating he is banned from the allotments, as they seen the explosion of his neighbours allotment "vandalism"; he is furious and claims he will fight against it. Jack turns up at Hilary's office and meets her husband. Martin's sister and mum appear at Carole's to collect his things, informing her he is now living in Canada. George comes home and interrupts Kelly and Suzie going through their holiday pictures; he once again hears the name Carlos and grows suspicious. He later questions Kelly about Carlos and she tells him that he is a 70-year-old bald man; George still has his suspicions. Recall returns home to discover Clingfilm has invited a group of his friends round; amongst them is Geoff. Recall is not happy and tells Clingfilm next time they want to have a meeting to go to Geoff's house. Jo turns up at the station asking Billy for money as she tells him her purse got robbed while she was in a club the night before. Thinking nothing of it, he gives her money to get home and get herself something to eat. Later, Billy's mum appears at his house telling him that Jo had an argument with her dad Tony the night before and stormed out claiming she was never going back. He tells her he had seen her earlier on and gave her money; his mum is relieved she is still alive and is okay. The watch is called to a car boot sale at which two lads have set fire to a box full of fireworks, setting them off and trapping several people in a warehouse where the fire exit's blocked. The same man and woman from the earlier shout are there. Pitbull informs Geoff that the post of sub officer is being abolished by head office, but Geoff just thinks it is a silly brigade rumour. He later goes round to Sandra's to invite her to a dance with him, but her male colleague emerges from the house and Geoff does not ask her. Marianne tells Nick she has applied for a job so she will be staying in London indefinitely.
107	9	"Episode 9"	Douglas MacKinnon	Neil McKay	23 November 1997	N/A
Blue Watch is called to rescue a man who is stuck in a chimney after trying to save a cat. Sicknote suggests having an exhibition of the station to mark its history; Geoff agrees. Geoff questions Nick about the position of sub officer being phased out. Jack's son Stephen has been taken to hospital. Sicknote gets a response from the council. Carole rings ADO Davies to arrange another date. Billy asks round Jo's friends in hope of tracking her down; Tony is not pleased with Billy's involvement. Kelly and George continue to bicker over Carlos as George's jealousy grows. Kelly then informs him she did not have an affair but could have done so and wishes she had; he furiously storms out and spends the night at the station. Jack and Linda spend the night in the hospital while Stephen is still unconscious. Carole sleeps with ADO Davies. Marianne goes for her interview. Tiggy and her ex-boyfriend are on the front page of a newspaper with the title "My night of passion in Parliament". Billy shows the rest of the watch and Gregg walks in and demands to know what they are looking at; he's furious. Stephen regains consciousness. Geoff and Sicknote bicker over who is going to run the celebration of the station; fed up with their constant squabbling, Nick informs them neither of them will be arranging it and appoints Recall to do it, against his will. Blue Watch is called to rescue a man who is trapped under his motor caravan. Billy and Recall later call in hospital to see him. A fax comes through to the station for Nick, informing the watch that two appliance stations are eliminating the sub officer post; everyone's shocked, especially Carole, as she fears for her job. Sicknote is no longer banned from the allotments, but the council have confiscated his old one and given him a new one; to his horror, it is the one he blew up. Beattie and Cyril take George in. Sandra tells Geoff she is sick of him constantly interfering in her life.
108	10	"Episode 10"	John Reardon	Simon J. Sharkey	30 November 1997	N/A
Blue Watch rescues a roofer who has fallen from a ladder and landed inches away from an electrical transformer. The pump is called to a children's birthday party, at which a clown is entertaining children with a karaoke machine. The plug socket sets alight, and the party is evacuated. Sicknote investigates, and finds a slug has crawled in behind the socket. Gregg helps the clown pack his equipment away, and is given a trick electric shock buzzer, which he tricks Billy with later on. Sandra Hallam visits Pearce and tells him she is going to work abroad for a year. She asks him to look after the house. Jack splits up with Hilary when she humiliates him in front of her friends. He throws a bottle of champagne at a framed picture and leaves. Recall spots paperwork when Baxter comes to visit, titled "Closure of Blackwall Fire Station". He tells the others that the exhibition about Blackwall is probably just a front to cover up the closure.
109	11	"Episode 11"	John Reardon	Simon J. Sharkey	4 January 1998	N/A
Billy gets into trouble for having a mobile phone on duty. He later explains to Nick that he's waiting for news on his missing sister. Nick asks him to keep the phone inside the station. ADO Davies arrives and wants to speak to Nick about health and safety checks, but they are saved by the bell when a shout comes in for the ladder crew. Recall, Jack and Sicknote discuss the possible closure of Blackwall while doing checks. Recall confronts Davies, who says he knows nothing about the closure of Blackwall, but expresses concerns about the cleanliness of the kitchen, especially the storage of Sicknote's herbal medicine. He reveals that he had it analysed and it contained pencil sharpenings, cigarette filters, grass cuttings and soil. Sicknote is furious, and says someone's been doctoring his herbal medicine. Maggie is upset by Davies's criticism of her kitchen, and walks out, promising that Nick will have her resignation in the post. Carol asks Davies not to report his concerns about Maggie, telling him he does not understand Maggie's background. The pump is called to a block of flats, where a strange smell is emanating from an empty flat. Pearce and George use the ladder to get into the flat. They retch and gag at the smell, then find a decomposed body beside the bed. It turns out to be a homeless woman who had started squatting there, not the man who owned the flat. When the pump returns, the guys argue about who messed with his medicine. They have to prepare their own lunch, during which Pearce interrogates Carol about Martin and her possible transfer. To shut Pearce up, Carol tells them all that her marriage is over, and that much like being transferred out of Blackwall, it could turn out to be one of the best things to happen to her. Gregg walks home at the end of the shift and finds Tiggy sitting on his doorstep. She explains that she wants to be with him, and that she would like him to meet her father at the House of Commons. Billy visits an address where his sister has been spotted, but is told to go away. He spots Jo, but is attacked by the mystery guy, and taken away by the police. He tells Gregg he knows the man is a drug dealer. Carol rings ADO Davies at home, and is shocked when his wife answers the phone. Nick goes to apologise to Maggie, and brings her back. Recall finds out that the report on the closure of Blackwall was simply confirmation that it is not being considered for closure after all. On a building site at St Hugh's Hospital, some workers are transporting gas cylinders. A bulldozer driver gets distracted and crashes into the on-site gas main, causing a huge explosion. Pearce, Sicknote, Nick, Gregg, Jack, George and Billy evacuate the hospital, coming up against opposition from the doctors and nurses. After the event, Billy is stopped in the street by the police, who say the drug dealer who attacked Billy has been found dead. They imply Billy is in the frame for his murder. They take a very confused Billy to the police station.
110	12	"Episode 12"	Ken Horn	David Humphries	11 January 1998	N/A
Officers rescue two boys who have crawled into a rubbish dump and are at risk of exposure to toxic landfill gas.
111	13	"Episode 13"	John Reardon	Simon J. Sharkey	18 January 1998	N/A
Blue Watch rescues a stranded bungee jumper, then attends to a college fire.
112	14	"Episode 14"	Ken Horn	Neil McKay	25 January 1998	N/A
Officers try to save a lorry driver trapped by falling machinery. Billy returns to work.
113	15	"Episode 15"	Frank W. Smith	Dave Humphries	1 February 1998	N/A
Jack wakes up with his girlfriend Nicky, who suggests that she could move in with him. Jack is obviously not keen on this idea. Maggie reassures Billy that a jury would be on his side, and reveals that Derek has sent a postcard saying he knows where Albie might be. Word of Clingfilm and Pearce's "Divorced Men's Weekend" starts to spread, and is the source of much ridicule for Pearce. Carole catches Pearce trying to open her mail from brigade personnel. She opens it, and it confirms her transfer to Upham. She tells Nick she does not want to go, and Nick suggests a chat with Chapman. In the mess, Gregg asks Recall how the Centenary event is going. Recall says he wants each watch to represent a different era of firefighting. Sicknote is miffed because white watch have been given the war period. Jack insults Recall and accuses him of being deliberately difficult before walking away. Recall says he's had enough of Jack and will lose his temper soon. Billy, Gregg, Sicknote and Pearce discuss Recall's temper, and Pearce tries to induce gossip about Carole's transfer. Nobody is interested, and Sicknote says nobody wants trouble. Carole tells Jack to keep personal problems with Recall outside of work. Nick takes Sicknote, Gregg and Billy out to inspect hydrants. Sicknote, driving the pump, spots an incident outside a block of flats. A mob of people are attacking a suspected paedophile. Just as Nick comes over, a young man throws a petrol bomb and sets the suspect's car on fire. The police say that a child was assaulted the previous week, and the residents wanted to get revenge. Later, it turns out that the child who made the accusation admitted she made it all up to cover a playground fight. The watch may be called to give evidence at the trial of the boy who threw the petrol bomb. The other pump gets back to the station, and Carole says that she no longer wants Jack and Recall together on her crew. She swaps Billy and Recall. Jack smugly goads Recall – first his wife, then Nicky the barmaid and now Carole are rejecting him in favour of Jack. George tells Jack he's out of order, and the others hold Recall back. Nick, fed up with Pearce's stickybeaking, tells him Carole's been promoted to Head Officer. At the end of the watch, Recall and Jack meet round the back of the station to square up. Recall tells Jack he has had enough of him, and punches Jack. A fight ensues, with pub landlord Jaffa and Nicky watching from the pub. George and Gregg break it up. Gregg congratulates Nick on his wind up of Pearce. Clingfilm tests out his camping equipment in Recall's front room, but when the doorbell rings, it is not Pearce but Noreen, Clingfilm's unstable ex-wife who was certain Clingfilm was the devil, hence their break-up. Jack goes to the pub, but Jaffa tells Jack he is barred for being a trouble maker. Jack's girlfriend Nicky, who is also the pub barmaid and niece of Jaffa, says if Jack's barred, she quits. They leave the pub together. Recall gets home and finds Doreen has tied up Pearce and Clingfilm in the living room, accusing them of being possessed by the devil. Recall grabs Noreen and throws her out. Recall leaves them tied up together and walks away. Back at his flat, Jack tells Nicky that her moving in with him would not be impossible.
114	16	"Episode 16"	Douglas MacKinnon	Neil McKay	8 February 1998	N/A
The relief undertakes a hydrant inspection. Sicknote spends the night at the protest camp and enjoys the wonders of magic mushrooms.Lil tells George that she will encourage Kelly to seek a divorce. Jack and Recall patch up after their fight from the week before. Clingfilm buys a new campervan and moves out of Recall's, much to Recall's joy. Marianne finds it hard looking after Nick's son Costas, and says to Nick that she feels worthless. Nick reassures her that she will be ok.
115	17	"Episode 17"	Graham Moore	Simon J. Sharkey	15 February 1998	N/A
It is Friday the 13th. Blue Watch is sent to Upham Fire Station for the day, and is plagued by a series of bizarre incidents. Billy sends a postcard from Spain and says that he's not coming back, much to Maggie's dismay. George reunites with Kelly.
116	18	"Episode 18"	John Reardon	Simon J. Sharkey	22 February 1998	N/A
The first shout is to a ship where a protester has climbed the mast in order to hang a protest banner and Sicknote is shocked when he realises it is his protester friends again. DO Chapman arrives at the Station with good news. He informs Nick that the post of Sub is not going to be abolished, but advises him to go for promotion because Station Officer may be abolished instead. Engineer Fiona is back at the station to check the new sirens, and Pearce takes her for a drink at Jaffa's pub. Just as Pearce asks Fiona home to meet Bruno, they are interrupted by Clingfilm, who wants to go to the Imperial War Museum. Fiona makes an excuse and leaves. George and Kelly have a BBQ, but it is very smoky and the neighbour calls 999. Pitbull and his watch show up, and Kelly asks them to stay for dinner, to George's horror. Derek tells Maggie he located Albie in Thailand, where he had been working as a painter. Unfortunately, he had died. Maggie is saddened. The Quigleys decide to take matters into their own hands when they discover the only reason the bypass is being re-routed near their house is a rare species of wildflower which grows in the woods, right where the environmentalists' camp is. Under darkness, and in camouflage, they creep into the environmentalists' camp and spray it with weed killer. Nick and Marianne take little Costas to Yianni's house, where Evgenia and Costas announce they have bought a flat and are moving back to Cyprus. Yianni hints heavily to Marianne that he thought she would be gone by now, but Marianne tells him she is here to stay. Back at home, Marianne proposes to Nick, but we do not find out his answer. On the next duty, the crew that stood by at Upham are called into Nick's office and Gregg owns up to causing the fire. Nick says it will be a disciplinary matter. On a bus, three children, who intentionally bought tickets short of their destination to save money, are shocked to see the conductor coming to check their tickets. They hide under the seats as the bus driver arrives back at the bus garage. They mess about on the buses, and one of them accidentally starts a fire by short circuiting the battery on the upper deck which spreads to a fuel tank. Pearce finds out that Carole will not be leaving after all, and they talk, tensely. Pearce says he might leave in order to get his promotion. The Watch is called to the bus garage where the three children are trapped. There are multiple huge explosions as the diesel tanks go up in flames, and danger lurks as Gregg tries to rescue the girl who is at the emergency exit window at the back of the bus. He climbs up and as he is about to rescue the girl there is an explosion and Gregg falls down. The screen fades to black. The series ends with Gregg lying in hospital with concussion, and Tiggy telling him she is in love with him, so he must choose whether he loves her or the brigade more.

=== Series 11 (1998–1999) ===
No. overall	No. in series	Title	Directed by	Written by	Original release date	UK viewers (millions)
117	1	"Episode 1"	Ian Knox	Tony Lindsay	12 September 1998	9.02
The series begins with the new style credits, opening with Pitbull nearly running over a young lady who is running. She turns out to be new firefighter Sally Fields, who turns up late to roll call. There are other new members of the watch to meet. With Nick temporarily seconded, and Carole gone (no explanation given) Pearce has been promoted Sub-Officer and is now in charge as acting Station Officer, and introduces Leading Firefighter Dan Barrett to the watch as his acting Sub Officer. Meanwhile, two workmen in a storm drain chat about a wedding, when the view changes to above ground and a group of boys playing football when a giant explosion emanates from the drain. Pearce quizzes Sally about why she was late. New firefighter Joe Walker introduces himself to Sally as the appliance makes its way to the explosion, and they flirt. Sicknote, Jack and Dan go into the storm drain and finds one of the workmen, Wayne, trapped. They work together to try and free him, but he's stuck and the water level is rising. The hook Wayne up to the winch on the pump, and try to pull him out, but the level goes up and up. Finally, he is freed and the watch have to go to hospital for hepatitis injections due to being in the drain. Pearce overhears Recall and the old boys telling Dan that Pearce makes misery wherever he goes. Disapprovingly, he tells Dan that he knows he was fast tracked, and that was not how it was done in his day. Jack also torments Dan. Pearce tells Sally off for being late. Dan tries to befriend Sally, but she tells him that after Pearce singing his praises, she is not interested. Recall, not long back from Scotland, tries to ring Laura, but a male Scottish voice appears on the answerphone. He tells Sicknote that the boys are really happy living in Scotland. Sally befriends Sicknote, who says he will stand up for her. Maggie finds there is no food in the mess, and Joe claims to have left the groceries in the back of his car. Sicknote has switched from herbal tea to organic juices. Dan offers to make lunch out of Sicknote's old mushrooms, and asks Sally to help. Joe ridicules Dan because he thinks he's posh. At the end of the watch, everyone goes to the pub, but Pearce and Dan continue to chat. Pearce cynically says they will have to keep an eye on Sally. Jack takes his son Steven fishing, and Steven confides that mum and her new husband are fighting a lot. Jack confronts his ex-wife, who says he needs to leave it alone. At the pub, Dan and Joe flirt with Sally. Dan lets slip that Joe has a girlfriend, and offers to walk Sally out. George's wife Kelly tells him she is thinking about being an underwear sales rep, a bit like Avon. George laughs at the idea, and Kelly is angry and says she is going on strike. Sicknote gets home and Jean complains he smells of the drains. Jean comments that Sicknote has had an awful lot of energy recently. Sally gets home to her flatmate, and tells her about her day. Her flatmate asks if they were alright about "things", and Sally says it has to stay in the past, not disclosing what "it" is. Joe's girlfriend drops him off at work, and they talk about him being a kept man as he gets out of the car. He and George have a chat about wives working. George goes to see Pearce about the upcoming fitness tests, which he's worried about. Dan and Pearce chat about it, and Dan says he does not want to be an assessor, he wants to take part in the tests in the hope of making the watch include him. The rest of the watch work out at the gym, preparing for the fitness tests. At a furniture warehouse, boss Jim encourages a fork lift driver to keep stacking boxes on top of each other. Jim argues with a customer over prices and walks off, leaving the forklift driver stacking. An electrical fault causes a spark to catch one of the sofas alight. Oblivious, customers in the unit next door are playing, shopping, and in one case, shoplifting, until the fire alarms go off. Blue watch are called and rush to the pumps, throwing on their uniform. Someone has filled Dan's boots with water. At the scene Nick, now "ADO Georgiadis", appears and tells them how to tackle the fire. Dan leads the crew into the burning warehouse. Jack continues to belittle Dan even inside the warehouse, which is full of toxic smoke. The crew crawl into the warehouse, but explosions are going off and the temperature is rising. Sicknote goes into another area and finds the two customers who were shoplifting, and gingerly leads them out. Jack and Dan continue to argue, until their team come to a closed door. They open it, and a huge flashover comes at them. The episode finishes suddenly.
118	2	"Episode 2"	Ian Knox	Tony Lindsay	19 September 1998	7.11
The factory shout continues where the last episode left off. Dan is left dazed as Pearce and Joe go back into the fire after Sally recklessly runs back into the factory and finds a forklift truck to pull the debris off of the fallen firefighters, Recall and Jack. They are pulled out of the building still unconscious. George and Sicknote succeed in rescuing the two shoplifters. Sally is reprimanded by Nick for recklessly risking her life and going against orders, but is praised at the same time for her quick thinking and giving fire crews the extra time they needed. Joe admonishes Dan in front of Pearce and Nick. Recall regains consciousness in hospital, while Jack's condition remains the same. Sicknote discovers a homemade device hidden in a shoebox and Nick tells him to hand it over to the Fire Investigation Team. Nick stands down Blue Watch as the fire is now under control. He says to Pearce that he saw the argument Joe and Dan had, and as Dan is seen as a 'rising-star' in the Brigade, if there are any problems, they will want to know about it. Later, the Watch head to the hospital to check on Jack and Recall. They learn that Recall will be kept in for a couple of days for observation and Jack is in surgery. Joe and Dan still argue about what happened at the factory. Dan walks away and Pearce follows and reassures Dan that mistakes happen, and experience comes from it. Pearce tries to say that Dan has nothing to prove. Dan disagrees. Nick turns up at the hospital and tells Sicknote that the device did cause the fire. The MO of the factory fire matches similar fires north of the river. There appears to be a serial arsonist. Jack's surgery is a success. Nick offers to bring Recall's family down to visit him. Recall says there is no need. Laura has a new boyfriend up in Scotland. He says its all amicable, for the sake of their kids, but in his eyes, he's sad. Nick is marrying Marianne. Pearce asks him when he is coming back to Blackwall. As soon as Nick has decided, he will let Pearce know. Next day, Jack is visited in the hospital by his son, Stephen and his ex-wife. George and Sicknote visit Recall and read about the fire in the paper which confirms the same arsonist caused the factory fire. Pearce is at home writing a letter to Fiona, the siren tester from the previous series, telling her that he now has a friend on the watching. At the hospital, Sicknote, who's been listening to the hospital radio, notices the DJ playing the wrong music. When he goes to complain to the DJ, he finds himself taking over the DJ duties as the man is too sick to continue. Much to the humour of the rest of the watch listening on the ward. The radio DJ, impressed by Sicknote's patter, asks if he could takeover the job for a couple of weeks while he recovers. Recall gets him and Jack a date with a couple of nurses, once they have both recovered themselves. Sicknote tells Jean about his new job as the hospital radio DJ, but she is busy being sick and does not really react. Following day back at work, Sicknote and George christen the newbies with nicknames, but only get round to Sally who gets nicknamed 'Gracie'. Pearce informs the watch that the fitness tests will occur at some point on shift. First up is Sally and George. Just as Pearce is about to give George his results, there is a shout at a flat above a Chinese restaurant. Dan initially hesitates before he and George proceed to rescue a mother and her baby. An explosion momentarily separates George and Dan, and Dan runs back in with a hose to put the fire out. Afterwards, Dan thanks Pearce for sticking by him. Back at the station, Pearce reluctantly tells George that he failed the fitness test and that he will have to take another one in a month. If he fails that, then George will have to take a full medical. In Pearce's Office, DO Chapman commends Pearce on leading Blue Watch through hard times. Pearce assumes that Nick's post as Temporary ADO means he will be coming back to Blackwall. Chapman says far from it, leaving Pearce confused. Joe's petty feud with Dan has him mess about with Dan's car. Sally offers to fix it for Dan. Sally effectively tells Joe to grow up as Joe's girlfriend pulls into the station car park. She shows him a house listing that she likes the look of. She then asks Joe if there is anything he likes the look of as he's distracted by Sally walking away.
119	3	"Episode 3"	Joanna Hogg	Len Collin	26 September 1998	7.11
It is the start of the shift. Joe is dropped off at work by his girlfriend, and Jack and Recall comment on the public display of affection as she says goodbye. Pitbull is being interviewed by the media about the warehouse at the fire, which has been claimed by an arsonist calling himself "The Torch". Recall tells the journalist to get out of the station. Dan and Pearce arrive together, with Pearce telling Dan to treat today as usual after putting people in danger during the warehouse fire. Dan starts to apologise to Joe, but falters, and just tells him he's pleased Joe is back at work. The watch tease George about failing the fitness tests. Elsewhere, a burglar breaks into a house, helps himself a wallet and leaves. Pearce tells Dan that he's enjoying being in charge, and that he thinks Nick's priorities are elsewhere now, so it is only a matter of time. Dan goes to apologise to Jack, who accepts his apology. The burglar breaks into another house, but this time is spotted by the homeowner, and chased out. A shout comes in to assist police, and both pumps go out. The burglar has got caught in a gap between two houses. Dan and Joe have a fight up against the engine, and they have to be pulled apart by a smartly dressed man. The homeowner is horrified to see the brigade have knocked through her wall to free the burglar. Pearce comes across the smartly dressed man, who introduces himself as the new temporary governor, Chris Hammond. He talks to Pearce about his history. Pearce tries to get some background information about Hammond, but fails. In the mess, the other members of the watch briefly discuss Hammond's arrival, before being distracted by a charity calendar featuring semi-naked men in fire brigade uniforms. Hammond is amused by their antics, but everyone is silenced by his arrival. He tells them he's not against having a laugh, but there is awkward silence. Hammond is very vague about where he's been posted before, and just says he has no family. He leaves the room, and the banter resumes. After the shift, a mysterious girl is watching the firefighters leave. Pearce and Dan go to see Hammond to ask him for a drink, but Hammond declines repeatedly. Jack and Recall head out to a disco together, where Recall winds up with a date, and Jack just drowns his sorrows and ignores his date. He goes to visit his ex-wife. Sicknote gets home to Jean, who's been feeling unwell. Dan and Pearce have a drink together, and Hammond shows up as they leave. Back at Pearce's the enjoy a takeaway together. George gets home and sees his old mate Terry, who's offering Kelly a job behind the bar of his new club. On a shout, Sally goes into a smoke filled building, and refuses to come out when she finds a casualty. The building starts to collapse on her. Dan goes in and rescues her just as her air runs out, much to Joe's annoyance. Sicknote gets home to Jean, who is still unwell, but tells him she's been to the doctor and is fine. As he goes to the kitchen, Jean starts crying. At his house, Chris asks a lady to help him with a bow tie. The mystery girl appears on his doorstep, and announces she is his daughter, Lisa. Hammond is surprised.
120	4	"Episode 4"	Rob Evans	Neil McKay	3 October 1998	7.92
Lisa is making herself at home at Chris's place. Chris tries to find out why she is come looking for him, but she avoids the question. Everyone arrives for the shift – George jogs in, Pearce and Dan discussing a book Pearce borrowed and Sally encouraging George. Chris shouts at a skip driver who's blocking the entrance, and stays in a bad mood. He orders the watch to wash the fire engines. Sally and Joe much around with the washing equipment and get into trouble with Pearce. On the roof of a building, a man climbs onto a roof. Clingfilm has already arrived and speaks to the man, who just signals at them. Dan realises he's deaf and uses sign language to communicate and gets him on to the cherry picker. Joe asks Sally out for a drink, as mates. Clingfilm and Dan argue, and this time Pearce sides with Clingfilm, which annoys Dan. Sally invites everyone to the drink with her and Joe. Jack goes for a walk with his ex-wife, and they kiss. Kelly and George go to see the bar where she wants to work for some training. They are shown around by a sleazy bouncer. At the pub, Sally flirts with Recall, and suggests they go on elsewhere, leaving everyone else. Joe and Dan are unimpressed. Joe's girlfriend appears, and they go to look at some flats. Chris gets home and Lisa has got settled in. He tells her he's spoken to her mother, and he wants her to go home. Lisa says she's had enough of her mother, and accuses Chris of ignoring her for her entire life. Chris tells Lisa that it was her mother who told him to get out of Lisa's life. He tells Lisa she can stay for a while. At Sicknote's, Jean is complaining that she never gets time with him any more because he puts the hospital radio station first. At the club, Sally seems determined to set Recall up with someone, but it is a disaster. He watches Sally successfully flirt with men. Jean turns up at the hospital radio station and tells Sicknote they have to talk. She tells him she is pregnant, live on the air, and he is shocked. The patients in the hospital all clap and cheer. DO Chapman comes to visit and greets Dan in a friendly way, so Dan confides in Pearce that his dad was a firefighter who died on duty, and DO Chapman was a close family friend. Sicknote is especially cheerful at work, but does not tell anyone why. Elsewhere, in a village scout hut, an elderly couple tidy up and prepare cakes before the husband leaves the wife alone, unaware that the front of the village hall is on fire. DO Chapman tells Chris he thinks he is the right man for the job. Pearce barges in on their meeting, and Chapman tells him Chris is doing a great job. Just as Pearce goes back to quiz Chris, a shout comes in for the scout hut. The team go in with breathing apparatus, and try to move a van near the scout hut to stop it exploding. Pearce and Dan go to question the children nearby, but Pearce gets aggressive and scares the kids off. Chris tells him off and says Dan was fine. Jack starts behaving strangely, becoming introverted. Back at the station, Chris tells a visitor that his friend will get his money tonight, and sends him away. Pearce and Chris argue, and Chris says he can see why he has the nickname Poison Pearce, because he "stirs things up like a fishwife", and still has not proved he deserves his job.
121	5	"Episode 5"	Steve Finn	Gil Brailey	10 October 1998	7.86
Sally and Joe meet in the corridor, then Dan calls her away. Sicknote tells George and Maggie he will be making an announcement. Pearce shows Dan a photo of his dad from a 1985 brigade magazine. Dan reiterates his request to not tell the others that his dad was in the brigade. Maggie gives Recall a business card from a dating agency, but Recall says he's not desperate – yet. Sally reminds the guys that Amy, the photographer from the calendar company, is coming in today. Sicknote starts to make his announcement, but a shout comes in and everyone leaves. The crews go to a farm fire, where Pearce fails to calm the resident guard dog. The guys go in and rescue some ponies. Sally goes to rescue some goats. Dan and Joe argue, and Pearce blabs about Dan's dad dying in action. Dan leads her up to the shower room and they sneakily photograph Pearce in the shower. Chris finds out that a photographer is here and loses his temper. He tells Pearce that he needs to clamp down on the watch. The rest of the watch get a telling off in the mess, but Chris warns them that he should be consulted next time. Sicknote makes his announcement and there is stunned silence before everyone congratulates him. The photo shoot continues and Recall tries to ask Amy out, but is interrupted by Chris, who also tries to ask Amy out. Exasperated, Recall calls the dating agency, and makes a terrible video for prospective dates. At the end of the shift, Joe asks Sally for a drink, while Dan looks jealously on. At the pub, Joe tries to kiss Sally, but she pulls away at the last minute. She goes back to her flatmate, and says that she is confused about her feelings for Joe, especially as he's buying a place with his girlfriend. Dan tells Pearce to stop being nosey and asking questions about his father. Chris takes Amy for dinner and takes her back to his place, where Lisa watches them. Jack plays video games with his son at his ex-wife's house, and her new husband objects. A young woman sits down on the steps of a modern brick built building, and waits for a man who gets out of a taxi. He tells the woman that he's engaged now. The woman is next seen creeping into a flat. The next shift begins with Maggie saying that "The Torch" has been busy committing arson again, setting fire to the library. Joe and Sally nearly kiss in the gym, before Dan interrupts and starts an argument. Joe's girlfriend, Jackie, arrives and the argument stops. A shout comes in to a block of flats, and the crews head off. They find the woman standing dumbstruck outside. She suddenly snaps back to reality and runs away. An unconscious woman is brought down from the burning building. The mysterious young woman is suddenly spotted standing on top of the building. Sally goes to speak to her, and finds out her name is Jane. Dan asks Sally to tie herself to a rope which he holds on to. Jane tells Sally that her friend stole her boyfriend, and now they're engaged. Jane goes to jump, and Sally grabs on to her. They fall off the building together, but are caught by Sally's rope. Jack's ex-wife turns up at his flat to apologise for the other day, and they wind up in bed. Recall goes for a date set up by the agency at Kelly's bar, but his date Madeleine is loud and brash, and not his type. Recall helps Kelly fend off the lecherous bouncer and exits the date. Joe goes to the pub with Sally and tries to hold her hand, but she pulls back and says they cannot do this because she likes him and she is not willing to share him with Jackie, then she leaves.
122	6	"Episode 6"	Nigel Douglas	Rachel Pole	17 October 1998	8.14
Sally is up in the tower in the yard, shouting for help. Pearce explains she is pretending to be an uncooperative victim, trapped in a burning building. Jack cynically remarks that its not a lot different to the usual Sally. Joe and Jack go and "rescue" her. Pearce tells Dan off for letting the watch not take it seriously. They continue with drills, climbing up ladders against the high walls. When it comes to putting the equipment away, they leave Pearce stuck up in the wall. Nick, now ADO Georgiadis, arrives back at Blue Watch, and asks Pearce what he's doing on the wall. Pearce says it is a security measure, and Nick rolls his eyes. Chris and Nick chat about Nick's new life at Lewisham, and Nick says he cannot wait for his temporary promotion to be over so he can come back to Blackwall. Chris tells Pearce off, but Pearce is unrepentant, and says Nick would not have a problem with it. In the mess, everyone is thrilled to see Nick, but just as he sits down for lunch, a shout comes in for a fire at a leisure centre, and they have to leave him. Pearce's engine arrives first, and he asks Dan and Joe to go into the building. Dan points out that nobody should go in until they have it confirmed the electricity is off. The rescue the casualty. As the shift ends, Joe tells Sally that just because Jackie wants to buy a flat with him, it does not mean the feeling is mutual. The photos for the calendar come back, and George and Dan are awarded "Best photo". At Nick's house Marianne asks about his day. He tells her he's not sure about the new station commander. Chris get home with Lisa and finds his flat has been trashed and "Pay up" written in shaving foam on a mirror. Jack collects his ex-wife and a holdall, and they drive away together. He tells Linda he'd give up the brigade if it meant the family reuniting, but they cannot decide on the practicalities of the two children involved, and Linda leaves in a huff. Sicknote and Jean look through his old photos, and Sicknote says he's sad that his family will not get to meet their baby. At the pub, Jackie tells Joe she knows he's jealous of Dan being chosen for the calendar and not him. Joe says they have to talk, and tells her that despite being together five years, since starting at Blackwall he feels like he's changed. Jackie says she understands, and he obviously means he's not ready to rush into buying a flat, which was not what Joe meant at all, but he chickens out of saying anything else and just agrees with her. In a home office, a young woman (An early Catherine Tate) says goodbye to a client and sends her son to watch a video as she deals with her final client of the day. Back at Blackwall, The Torch is the subject of discussion. Pearce asks Nick if he can have a word. He implies to Nick that he's not happy with Chris. Nick tells him to stop begrudging other people happiness, especially now he's got his promotion. In his office, Chris makes a call, simply telling the person on the other end "Tell your boss I got his message". Joe tells Sally he spoke to Jackie, but they're interrupted by Recall's horror date from the other night, who tells them they met through an agency. The other lads all laugh as she runs to find Recall and starts seducing him in front of them. She lets them know about the incident with Kelly and the bouncer. George is angry that he was not told. Recall lies to his date and says he's seeing someone else now. At the home office, a fire starts in a waste paper bin, and the engines go off to deal with it. Jack climbs up a drain pipe to rescue the woman and her son while everyone else gets set up with ladders. Jack rescues the boy and passes him out to Pearce, who's finally arrived with a ladder. Nick tells Jack off for going in without breathing apparatus. Chris then tells Nick off for telling Jack off and undermining him. Nick, in return, tells Chris to stop making ridiculous allegations. At the pub at the end of the shift, Jackie turns up and suggests a night out with Dan and Sally. Dan is enthusiastic, but Sally and Joe are not pleased. Jack goes to see Linda for a chat, and tells her that he'd take both children if they ran away together. At the club, Kelly serves Chris, who says he's here for Terry. She does not know who he is, but he offers to buy her a drink. Chris tells Terry he "wants out", and Terry says there'll be a payment plan. George arrives, and Terry says he will fire the bouncer, as long as George takes his place as bouncer. Chris creeps out through the back door of the club.
123	7	"Episode 7"	Gary Love	Len Collin	24 October 1998	8.47
Jack meets Linda in a coffee shop. She tells him that Ian knows something is going on. Jack tells her not to worry, to bring the kids tomorrow and they will run away to Ireland. A group of squatters have set up in an underground garage. The garage owner arrives and tells them they have to leave in 4 hours. Kelly pressures George about taking the bouncer's job. Kelly says he should call himself a door man, not a bouncer. George jogs into work. Back at the squat, the garage owner arrives, determined to remove the squatters. He reverses into their camp in a van. As the shift starts, Sally voices her concerns about the night out which Jackie has arranged. Sicknote is practising breathing exercises to help his pregnant wife. A shout comes in to help put out a fire at the squat. A fight ensues between the garage owner, the squatters and the baliffs, and some of the firefighters find themselves in the middle of it. Maggie tries to set Recall up with a friend's daughter, much to Joe's amusement. In the office, Nick is having a serious discussion with Chris, and asks why he dislikes Pearce so much. Nick tells Chris he needs to take charge of the situation. A phone call comes in for Chris, and he says he has to leave, but Pearce will cover for him. Nick disapprovingly agrees to this, and tells him not to set a bad example for the watch. Chris goes to find Lisa, who made the phone call. It turns out she has been arrested for shoplifting. Lisa tells him she is leaving. With Chris gone, Nick asks Pearce what he thinks of Chris. Pearce says he cannot decide. The calendars arrive and everyone coos over them. George gets some fan mail, which he reads to the others. Joe goes to collect Jackie from work, when she reveals that she's been offered a promotion to the office in Milton Keynes. Joe tells her that she should have asked him first, and moving away is not his dream like it is hers. Nick confides in Marianne that he thinks Chris is hiding something. Marianne says Nick needs to give Chris more time to settle in. At the club, Dan gets drinks in, and Sally and her flatmate ridicule Jackie from the dance floor while she sulks in a booth. Dan lies and tells Jackie that Joe talks about her all the time at work. Joe confides in Sally about the Milton Keynes job offer. Yvonne, Sally's flatmate tells Dan that Sally fancies him. Joe accuses Jackie of flirting with Jackie. They argue and Joe dumps her. Sally goes after Jackie, who is in the club toilets, crying. She tells Sally to tell Joe she will be at her mother's. Meanwhile, Yvonne is telling Joe lies about Sally, saying she has a bad temper and has been in big trouble in the past. Jack is at home, packing CDs, when he gets a silent phone call. He thinks it is Linda, but nobody speaks. At Linda's house, she slams the phone down as Ian comes into the room. George tells Kelly he will take the job at the club. Ian arrives at Jack's flat to talk. He tells Jack to leave Linda alone, and tries to punch him, but just loses his balance and falls down. A young lad, Gary, and his girlfriend are sitting in a stolen car and showing off. Recall thanks Maggie for setting him up, but Maggie says her feedback was that Recall reminded her of the ex and it was not going to happen again. More fan mail arrives for George, from men. Gary, in the stolen car, is now involved in a police chase when the car loses control and gets wedged under a truck. The watch are called out to help. An oil barrel comes lose from the works unit and the stolen car suddenly goes up in flames, taking the lives of Gary and his girlfriend. Sally seems very upset by the whole situation and walks away. Joe tries to calm her down, telling her that the "scum" who stole the car deserved it, and she reveals that in her youth, she used to go stealing cars for kicks until something similar happened to her friends, and she was sent to a young offender's institution. Sally goes to apologise to Chris for her behaviour. She explains that her parents had split up and she was attention seeking. The rest of the watch decide it does not matter, they still like Sally. Jack tells the lads he's done, but does not explain that he's running away to Ireland. Lisa comes to meet Chris at the station to see if he wants to go to the cinema, but Chris says they will do something tomorrow. Lisa goes to the pub to watch the rest of the watch. Recall is nice to her and buys her a lemonade. Chris goes to Terry at the bar and gives him some of the money. George turns up at the bar for work, unaware of Chris. Jack arrives at the cafe, and waits for Linda and the boys, but they do not arrive. He realises he's been stood up. Finally, we see what Chris is involved in – poker. Terry shoves George out of the room before he can see who's there. At the club, the fire brigade show up for an inspection. They also see the poker game and say they're calling the police because the club does not have a licence for gambling. George grabs Kelly and tells her to run. Jack goes to Linda's house, but nobody answers.
124	8	"Episode 8"	Nigel Douglas	Graham Mitchell	31 October 1998	8.50
At the station, there is a tense moment with Chris tells Nick he does not think he needs to come on shouts any more and it makes him uncomfortable. Sally confront Joe about his reaction to finding out she'd "been inside", but they cannot settle their differences. Nick finds the charity calendar, and is very angry about it, accusing Chris of allowing the watch to "cheapen the brigade". He says Chris has no discipline over the watch. Chris stands up for himself, and tells Nick to let go of his baby. Jack goes to Stephen's school, only to be told that Stephen had not been in, and they could not contact his mother. Nick gets home to Marianne and she tells him he's been in a bad mood since he went back to Blackwall, and that he'd had an argument with Chris today. He storms off down to the pub. Terry speaks to George and Kelly and says he's told the police that they work for him. George fears that if word gets back he's been moonlighting, he will lose his job with Blue Watch. Jack goes back to Linda's house, but it is all dark. Nick meets George at the pub, and says Chris will be okay once he's settled in. He goes home to Marianne, who gave up on Nick coming home in time for going out for dinner. She says she's made a big mistake giving up life in Holland for a workaholic like Nick. In the morning, she treats him coolly. Nick says he's putting in for a transfer. At the Quigley's, Bert gives Jean raspberry leaf tea to settle her upset stomach and tells her to relax. At Sally's flat, Sally is still upset over Joe's reaction. Jack speaks to the Headmaster of Stephen's school, who tells him that Ian has taken a new job, but not left a forwarding address. At roll call, Chris tells the lads they will be cleaning the mess today, and that he wants all copies of the charity calendar given to him for disposal. Nick tells Chris that Terry, the club owner, has called in, and told Nick that Chris was in the club when it was raided. Chris confesses that he was, but Terry is only stirring things because he owes Chris money. Nick reveals that Terry accused Chris of having gambling debts. Chris loses his temper with Nick and says Nick is trying to prevent his promotion. He chucks Chris out of his office. Marianne and her friend Helen have taken Costas and his friend Tom to the cinema, when Nick calls and says he cannot put in for a transfer while Chris is mucking things around. Marianne, annoyed, says Nick needs to get over the Chris Hammond issue, and joins her friend in the cinema. She hangs up on Nick. Not long after she sits down, the movie screen starts to distort and melt. Back at Blackwall, Chris asks to speak to Nick again, and begs him not to tell Chapman about the gambling. A shout comes in for the cinema where Marianne is. Inside, Marianne and the other cinema goers are being evacuated. When the pump and ladder arrive, the roof of the cinema is well alight. Chris takes charge, and Nick tags along in his car. The BA crew go in, hosing down the flames and looking for trapped visitors. Nick speaks to the cinema manager, trying to work out if he has seen Marianne. The BA crew start carrying people out, but the roof begins collapsing on them. Sicknote brings out a mobile phone – it is Marianne's phone. Nick starts ordering people into the burning building to get Marianne, but Chris tells him he's clouded by personal emotion. DO Chapman orders all the BA crews to withdraw. George helps carry out some more people as the ceiling falls. Dan tells Nick, who has charged in, that he must withdraw for his own sake, but Nick refuses and wades in for Marianne and Costas. He finds her in a back room. Dan grabs Costas and Nick leads everyone towards the exit. Suddenly, a large beam falls, and Nick pushes Dan to safety as the beam lands on him, crushing him, killing him instantly.
125	9	"Episode 9"	Nigel Douglas	Ian Drummond	10 January 1999	10.53
Life goes on at Blackwall, and news of Nick's death has hit them hard. DO Chapman is taking roll call, giving a brief obituary for Nick. He asks for a minute's silence, but a shout comes in. A man is stuck in an aggregate silo, and they have to leave. Pearce puts up the ladder to assess the situation for Sicknote, and George calls an ambulance. The silo is leaking gravel, so the victim is sinking as gravel pours out. Using the ladder as a platform, Sicknote secures the man, and Joe and Dan try to pull the man out. Chris suggests cutting a hole in the side of the silo, but Dan asks if that will not just increase the undertow. Sicknote starts to get sucked into the silo too. Sicknote and the man emerge from the bottom of the silo. Back at Blackwall, everyone congratulates Sicknote, but he is very modest. Chris says that Nick's body is being flown to Cyprus for burial, so there will be no funeral for them to attend. They all decide to go for a drink to honour him instead. Pearce goes to see Chris, and asks if he thinks there is anything they could have done to save Nick, but Chris says he does not think so. Pearce implies that since Chris disliked Nick, he probably is less bothered about his death, but instead of coming across as the comforting statement he'd intended, Chris is insulted by the insinuation that he wanted Nick dead and Pearce is sent packing. After the shift, Dan goes to see his mother. His mother said she always felt the brigade were like his father's second family, and as such, she does not really like them any more. The lads go to the pub, and are surprised to see Fiona, who's come to visit Pearce. Joe goes to eavesdrop on Pearce and Fiona, and reports his best chat up lines back to the rest of the boys. At Sally's flat, Sally is dressing to go to the pub, and Yvonne teases her about having Joe to herself. She asks Sally how she can carry on when a colleague dies in the line of duty, and Sally accuses her of trying to put her off staying in the brigade. Jean turns up, and Sicknote tells her it is dangerous for a pregnant woman to be in the pub. Sally arrives and Joe offers to buy her a drink. Marianne goes to the station to collect Nick's belongings, where she is comforted by Maggie. Maggie takes her to the pub to see everyone. Marianne tells Jack that Costas has been taken back to Cyprus, and she misses him. At another table, Jean shows everyone her baby scan pictures. Pearce gives a touching speech about Nick to the people in the pub. George and Recall spend some time with Marianne, and the others play pool. Marianne wishes Chris good luck and leaves, but Chris comes after her and apologises for his curtness. Marianne angrily tells Chris that if he had not been there, Nick would have taken a transfer and left, and still be alive. She tells Chris she holds him responsible for Nick's death. Dan asks Sally why he feels like he's on the outside looking in. At his flat, Jack gets home to find an answerphone message from Linda, saying they have moved away and he is not to contact them. Pearce and Fiona leave the pub together, to much catcalling and giggling from the crew. At Joe's place, a drunk Sally and Dan have a water fight while they look for the coffee to help them sober up. They wind up in a clinch. Pearce wakes up on his sofa the next morning, and Fiona is just leaving. She promises to call when she gets home. Jack goes to a solicitor and says he wants his son back. The solicitor says he has a good chance as long as they're in the country. Chris is called to HQ, regarding a vague message Nick left about wanting to sort out problems with Chris. Chris says it was only a small disagreement over admin, and it is brushed under the table. The watch are called out to a vintage car which has a small JCB and angry driver stuck in it, thanks to an enthusiastic young man who did not know how to control the JCB. Yvonne turns up at the station at the end of the shift, looking for Sally. She tags along with Joe on his walk home, who says he's now single. Yvonne says if he wants any help getting to know Sally, all he has to do is take Yvonne for a drink. Also at the station is Fiona, who's come to see Pearce and ask if he wants to come out for dinner. They go off in a taxi. Recall and George marvel at how easily Pearce has got a girlfriend. Chris goes to Terry and pays off his debt. Terry implies that he's going after George now. At the end of the dinner date, Fiona kisses Pearce. George turns up at Chris' place to tell him about Terry's job offer. Chris suddenly works out that George is talking about Terry's club. He tells George just to keep it quiet. At Dan's flat, Sally and Dan cook dinner together. They're still a bit drunk, but Sally says she is not sure they're doing the right thing. Dan convinces Sally to make a go of it, and they kiss, sending the cookery equipment everywhere.
126	10	"Episode 10"	Rob Evans	Tony Lindsay	17 January 1999	11.01
Bert is tidying the house while Jean sleeps. Chris and Terry meet up to discuss George, and Terry torments him and tells Chris to come to a new "game" tonight. Unbeknownst to Chris, Lisa has followed him, and is seen by Terry. On the way to work, Yvonne "casually" bumps into Joe and reminds him she is free to talk about Sally. She gives Joe her mobile number, and lets it slip that Sally's not been home for two nights. Sally is in the car with Dan, and they discuss how to explain away their arriving together. George and Recall show Sicknote a baby's cot mobile, but he is unimpressed. Jack storms into his solicitor's office, saying that he needs to know what is going on. Joe tells George that Jackie wants to meet up, but George says he does not want to get involved. Joe is annoyed by this reaction. Jack arrives late for work, in the middle of roll call, as The Torch's involvement in the cinema fire is being discussed. Pearce is being teased by the boys about his night with Fiona. Joe confronts Sally about her not being at her flat, and she says she's been staying with a friend. Joe asks if she's been with Dan, and Sally lies and denies it. Dan asks Sally if Joe's been giving her hassle, but a shout comes in at an industrial estate before she can answer. They send Joe to climb over the fence, but the security guard comes before he can complete his jump. The boys leave Joe to make his own way down from a container unit. Pearce spots a young lady running away – it is Chris's daughter, Lisa. Back at the station, the police are waiting in the car park. They want to speak to George about Terry. George fears they're here to arrest him, but in fact they want him to grass on Terry. Chris is told off by DO Chapman for letting George get away with not filling in a secondary employment form. Sicknote is invited to be a school liaison officer, but he's hesitant to accept any new responsibility with the baby due soon. Fiona calls Pearce at work and gets him in trouble with Chris. Jack rings his ex mother in law to find out where Linda is. As he's on the phone, his father in law brings Stephen in to the house, but Jack does not know. Everyone heads off to a shout at a secondary school. Joe announces the nominations for Sicknote's baby's nickname, but Sicknote shouts at them to stop, and then tells them that Jean had a miscarriage. Everyone falls silent. Chris goes to see Sicknote in the gym, where he's beating up a punchbag. Chris tells Sicknote he should go home and be with Jean. At the end of the shift, Recall hides the baby mobile from earlier. The mood is sombre. Dan and Sally discuss Sicknote's loss, and Joe catches them cuddling. He makes excuses and leaves. They all head home separately. It is a night of heartbreak at the pub – Fiona comes to see Pearce to tell him that she's been involved with someone else for a while, and she does not want Pearce to get the wrong idea. Joe meets Jackie, who says she wants him to move out of their flat. Dan sits alone. Jack turns up at his in-law's house again and asks to see Linda, but is sent away. He waits outside and eventually sees Linda and Stephen, but she tells him to leave them alone. Chris gets home and Lisa is out. She turns out to be at the pub, having a lemonade with Recall. Joe sees Recall with Lisa, and phones Yvonne to ask if she wants to come out. At the Quigley's, Jean is sobbing, but Sicknote does not know what to do and awkwardly exits.
127	11	"Episode 11"	Gareth Milne	Colin Wyatt	24 January 1999	10.81
Jack's head is down a storm drain, listening. Sicknote's is down another. A frantic bystander wants to know why nothing has happened for the last hour – she wants her puppy. They turn the water on between the two drains and blast the dog out. Joe's stuff is now stowed around the station after Jackie threw him out. Maggie says she will give him a room if he needs one. They boys tease Joe about being homeless. Dan asks Sally if they're "still on for tonight". Everyone speculates about Pearce being a ladies' man, but he does not rise to the bait. Pearce explains to Dan that he and Fiona have decided to leave things for a while. Sicknote suggests that George's betting pool on who's going to get a girlfriend first be widened to include Jack, Recall and Pearce. The pump crew goes off to a burst water main, but it turns out to be a hoax. Pearce sees the mystery girl again, disappearing into the phone box. He still does not know it is Lisa. This time the ladder crew get a shout to a non-existent flat. Lisa is at the back of the crowd of bystanders, and Pearce grabs her and says she has some explaining to do. Chris comes over and takes Lisa away, telling Pearce he will deal with it. Pearce sees Lisa refer to Chris as Dad, and is shocked. Everyone teases Pearce about Fiona until Dan tells that Pearce and Fiona have broken up. Joe reluctantly agrees to move into Maggie's spare room, and Derek comes for Joe's stuff. Chris speaks to Pearce about his daughter, and tells him he left his wife when Lisa was five. Pearce says he will keep things quiet about Lisa. Joe jokingly tells Sally he's miserable because nobody at Blackwall loves him. Dan tells Joe to leave Sally alone. Joe suddenly works out that Dan and Sally are an item, and is angry. Sally apologises to Joe, who walks away. Sally turns on Dan, and says there is nothing between them. He goes to Maggie's, where he finds all his things hanging up neatly. He realises he's made a terrible mistake. Terry turns up at Chris's flat, and says ADO Chapman has been to see him, asking questions. He tells Chris that if he comes back to play cards for him, he will not tell DO Chapman about George. Chris tells Terry to leave. George is at the pub with Recall, discussing his dilemma. Joe walks in, telling the boys Maggie is a nightmare. Outside the pub, Lisa is waiting for Recall. She says her dad is going to chuck her out. Recall, oblivious to her dad being Chris, lets her into his car and they drive off to discuss it. Yvonne meets Joe at the pub and he tells her about Dan and Sally. Yvonne is surprised. Jack leaves an answerphone message for his solicitor, then falls asleep. Lisa and Recall chat, and she tells him that her Dad does not want her around and just wants to send her back to her mother. Recall asks what her dad does, and she says he works for a security company. Recall tells Lisa she can always talk to him. Lisa kisses him on the cheek. Yvonne and Joe talk, and Yvonne tries flirting with Joe. Chris walks in, and Joe hides. Yvonne is disappointed. Jack is woken up by someone ringing his doorbell – it is his solicitor. She tells him that it will not be long until she finds Linda. Back at the pub, Yvonne goes to the bar and talks to Chris. Chris flirts with her, and she buys him a drink. Chris stares pointedly at Joe, and tells Yvonne to ditch "Billy Idol" and come out with him. At the Quigley house, Sicknote finds Jean crying in bed, but still cannot work out what to do, so closes the door. The next morning, Maggie wakes Joe up at 6:30am. He is not impressed. At work, Dan tries to get Sally to talk to him, but she refuses. Pearce tells Dan that he's going to fight his own battles, and does not need Dan speaking up for him. Jack arrives looking rough, and Chris tells him to tidy himself up. Jack is rude, and Recall tells him to sort himself out or he will be in trouble. The boys tease Joe about living with Maggie, then Sicknote asks about the mystery blonde he was spotted with in the pub – Yvonne. Joe makes out that they had a wild date, but Chris, who knows better, smirks as he walks away. A shout comes in to a block of flats, and Jack and Dan go in with the hose. There's been smoke reported in some of the flats. Dan knocks on one of the doors of the affected flats, but Jack just barges through the door, breaking it down and scaring the elderly lady inside. Chris tells a sullen Sicknote he's not going in, which annoys him. Sally and Joe put on breathing apparatus and head to the basement. They break into the boiler room and locate the fire and casualty on the level below. Steam suddenly erupts in front of Sally and Joe. Joe sends Sally ahead and says he will deal with it. Sally hands the casualty to Recall and rushes back to find Joe. She drags Joe out. Jack apologises to Dan, and Dan tells him to deal with his problems. George says he's never seen Sally move as fast as she did to rescue Joe. Sicknote loses his temper when Maggie offers him a cup of tea. He accuses everyone of thinking he cannot do his job, or tiptoeing around him. Maggie talks to Sicknote, and he says he does not know how to deal with Jean or his own sadness. He breaks down in front of Maggie.
128	12	"Episode 12"	Rob Evans	Jonathan Rich	31 January 1999	10.65
On a drill, Sally and co get dolled up in their chemical suit to deal with a leak when a tray of teas is brought out by a workmen. Pearce tells Dan off for not preparing properly. Back at the station, Joe asks Sally to go for a quick drink, pointedly adding if she is "not busy with Joe". Sicknote tells Maggie that the best way to get over his loss is to keep busy. Maggie offers to make Joe a sandwich, and Recall starts joking about Maggie mothering Joe. Maggie then passes Joe a pair of his jeans, which she's ironed, and are literally as stiff as a board. Joe looks on in horror as Recall and Sally chuckle. Jack lies and tells Recall he and Linda are getting back together. Recall says to take it slowly, and Jack snaps that Recall does not know the situation like he does. Dan, Joe and Sally are cleaning the yard, when Joe starts making snide remarks about Dan. Later, Dan apologises to Sally for snapping at Joe, and for messing up things with Sally. Dan asks Sally if she'd like to go for a drink, or to go away for a few days. Sally says she will think about it. George goes for his hearing about moonlighting at Terry's club. He tells DO Chapman that he'd only gone to the club to see if he could get a job, and he was not actually working, but Chapman says that's not what the report stated. Recall asks Chapman what he thinks the committee will make of George's moonlighting, and he indicates it will not be a good outcome. Chapman watches the crew do drills under Dan's command. The rope gets tangled on the ballast, and Joe struggles to untie it. George makes light of it. Dan calls Joe a pillock, and accuses Joe of doing it on purpose. Pearce overhears Dan having a go at Joe and tells him to stop acting like a spoiled child. Dan goes away and sulks by himself. Joe goes back to Maggie's and gets dressed for going for a drink with Sally. Maggie tells him she wants him to be careful and gives him a packet of condoms, which he throws into a drawer, embarrassed, before retrieving them and putting them into his pocket. Jack sees his solicitor, who tells him he has to start living life again. Angrily, he tells her he will enjoy life when Linda and Stephen are back. Yvonne goes to see Chris, and they're interrupted by Lisa who says she has a date "With a very nice professional man". Joe and Sally go out to dinner at a nice restaurant. Sally confesses that Jackie came to see her after work to say she still lived Joe, which makes Joe cross. Joe tells Sally he's fed up with her mucking him and Dan about. Insulted, Sally throws down money to cover her half of the meal, makes a scene, and leaves. Lisa's date is Recall, and they go bowling. Dan is still at the station, filling in assessment forms. Recall tells Lisa he should not see her again, and she is unhappy. The next morning, Lisa finds Yvonne is still at Chris's, much to Lisa's surprise. Lisa tells Chris she is going out again, and might stay out all night. Chris says that's fine, and Lisa is amazed. Yvonne gets back to the flat, where Sally is scowling at the table. She asks Sally what happened since she and Joe were made for each other. Sally says she cannot stop thinking about Joe, but Yvonne would not believe the fight they had. Sally and Yvonne arrange to go out after work for a girls' night out. At work, Dan goes to see Pearce about the report, which he has not finished. He tells Pearce that the crew commander's course may not be for him, or maybe the whole brigade thing is not for him. In the mess, Recall is the butt of jokes for going out with a younger woman. Maggie says if the date was a disaster, maybe Joe's date was not the right girl for him after all. It is Jack's birthday, but he's not in the mood for celebrating. Sally runs off to the gym and Dan follows her. She tells him she wants time by herself and sends him away. A shout comes in, and the pump is needed. Jack drives the pump to a building site, with Recall, Pearce and Dan. A sign is dangling from high up on scaffolding. Dan ties a rope around it and throws the ballast to Pearce. Dan hauls it up, but the scaffolding collapses on Dan, leaving him dangling. Pearce coaxes Dan into sitting up. The ladder crew arrive. Dan is starting to lose his cool, so Pearce distracts him by getting him to talk about his dad. Another ladder crew arrive with a big ladder. Bits of scaffolding keep falling, hitting Pearce and Dan. Pearce gets Dan to shuffle onto his bit of scaffolding, which is more stable. Sally goes up on the cherry picker and rescues them. By the time she gets there, Dan is pale and shaking, but tells Pearce he's going to finish that report. Joe asks Sally if she is coming to Jack's party, but she is vague. Dan shows up at Pearce's house, and says he wants to say thank you and apologise. Pearce tells him his father was not the best example either. At the pub, a stripper dressed as a policewoman shows up for Jack's birthday, but he walks off in a huff once he realises that she is not a real police officer with information about Linda. Jackie walks in and is warmly greeted by Joe. She thanks Sally for helping them. Sally is confused, but then Dan arrives with Pearce and she makes a big fuss of Dan. Recall and Sicknote are building a house of cards. Kelly arrives and sees George on the fruit machine. She asks him how the hearing went, but he says it is not looking good. Kelly sees Chris and asks what he's doing there. George says he's his boss, and Kelly says he was always at the club, playing cards. George confronts Chris about what Kelly said, and says he has to have a word, but Chris refuses. George works out that Chris was only there because he had debts, but Recall interrupts. At Jack's house, the solicitor arrives and says Linda and Stephen are in America. Jack babbles about going to America too, but the solicitor shows him a fax from Linda which says she is not coming back and refers to him as her ex-husband. Jack cannot believe it, but the solicitor says it is all verified. Jack accuses the solicitor of being part of Linda's plan. Jack shouts at her to get out. At the pub, the house of cards is reaching a pinnacle. Jackie and Joe kiss, and Sally sees them. She suddenly tells Dan she wants to go away with him. Lisa shows up at the pub, and Chris asks her what she is doing there. The others are stunned that Chris has a daughter. Lisa tells Chris she is "Here to see the boyfriend" and kisses Recall, while the others all stare. The house of cards falls down.
129	13	"Episode 13"	David Innes Edwards	Len Collin	7 February 1999	10.91
Jack leaves the house and is confronted by his solicitor. She gives him an invoice and says she will not represent him any more. Jackie and Joe are kissing in the car in the yard when Jack arrives and interrupts them. Jackie tells Joe to come home. Jackie asks Sally if she can come to a "Joe's moving back in" party and she wants Sally and Dan there. Sally seems reluctant. Jaffa says he heard Chris's daughter was caught with Recall. George says there is not a lot they know about Hammond. Recall arrives and tries to sneak past Chris's office, but Chris catches him. Sicknote is singing happily in the mess, and tells him Jean's feeling better. When Jean then rings, he tells Sally to tell Jean he's busy. They go to do drills up the tower. Joe goes up there with a puppet in school uniform, and Sicknote says it looks like his first girlfriend, then the comparisons are made to Recall's situation with Chris's daughter. Jack refuses to go up the tower because "It's not funny", then storms off, saying you should not mess with people's young families. George talks to Chris about the club, but Chris says he will not tell Chapman that George was not doing anything. Pearce comes to see Chris about Jack, and interrupts. Sally tells Dan that Jackie has invited them over, and Dan rolls his eyes. Chris goes to see Jack and asks him to explain his behaviour. Jack replies flippantly. Recall checks on Jack, and asks what the problem is. He thinks Jack is cross because of Recall and Lisa. Sicknote takes a call on Hammond's phone – it is Jean, and he tells her to stop calling. Joe tells Maggie he was with Jackie the previous night, and Maggie gives him a key so he can come and go as he pleases. Dan tells Sally he really does not want to go to Jackie's, but Sally tells him that since Jackie would not take no for an answer, neither will she. Chapman arrives, and tells Chris that they're going to have a full hearing about George, and recommend dismissal. George asks what would happen if Chris was to vouch for him. Chapman is shocked, but lets Chris tell him that George was just there seeing his wife. Chapman sends George out. He asks why Chris did not tell him that he was there. Chapman is furious, and tells him that he's disappointed he recommended Chris for the job. Lisa shows up at the station, and Recall angrily tells her she should have said that Chris was her Dad. He tells her to go home and leave him alone. A shout comes in and both crews go out. On the pump, Chris tells George it looks like his job is safe. George asks about Chris's, but gets no answer. At the fire at a circus rehearsal, Recall, Dan and Sally go in with the new breathing apparatus. Jack, manning the hose, tells George he thought he saw someone in the sky. He repeats this to Chris. Jack goes up above the roof on the long ladder and tells them the water is doing nothing. The BA crew are stuck in a maze of mirrors and smash their way through. Recall tells them his new BA gauge seems wrong. They find the three people missing, but Dan radios back there is much smoke. Jack, face blackened by smoke, gets closer and chants at the smoke in a trance. On the ground, the pump controller tells Jack he thinks there is a problem. Part of the roof comes crashing down, and Chris orders Jack down. The BA crew find only one survivor. They say it looks like the arsonist is back. Recall rushes to Jack, who tells them they all make him sick. Paramedic says it is lack of oxygen. Jack starts having a go at Recall saying it is his fault Laura left. Jack continues to behave oddly, making accusations at Chris. He lunges at Chris, but Joe jumps in front of him and stops him. Back at Blackwall, Chris reprimands Jack, signs him off and sends him to Welfare for counselling. He leaves, and Chris and Recall chat. Recall explains about Jack's wife. From the mess, George watches Jack walk home. They are all subdued. Sicknote wonders why none of them picked up on how unhappy Jack was. Joe tells Maggie that Jackie's asked him to move back in. Maggie warns Joe not to rush things. At Jack's house, Jack ignores the ringing phone and looks at his family photo. It turns out to be Recall phoning, and he tells everyone he will go to visit Jack alone. At the hospital radio station, Sicknote pours his heart out to his listeners. Terry goes to see Chris at the end of the shift and says he wants money, but Chris refuses. Terry asks if Chris realises the ramifications of not playing along, but Chris tells him he's come clean to his boss. Terry drives away, angrily. Lisa gets home, and tells Chris that she is not seeing Recall any more. At Jackie's flat, Sally and Dan welcome Joe to his "Welcome home" party, but he seems unimpressed. Jackie's dinner is awkward. She asks Dan how long he and Sally have been together. Sally says she does not see herself and Dan as a couple. Joe says he does not either. George tells Kelly he's been exonerated. Kelly says she has a new job selling tupperware. Jack tells Recall that Linda is not coming back, and he blames himself. Recall and Jack get drunk together. Dan and Sally walk home from Jackie's party, laughing at Jackie's stories about Joe's teddy bear. They end up kissing, and Sally invites Dan back to hers. Sicknote gets home and Jean is packing. She says she is going away, but will not say where. At Sally's, Dan and Sally get home. Yvonne emerges from the bedroom, and Chris appears from the bathroom. Sally and Dan stare. Recall gets home and Lisa is on his doorstep, begging him not to make her go back to Chris's. Recall says she can stay at his for one night. Chris packs his stuff and leaves. Sally and Dan sit on the sofa in silence.
130	14	"Episode 14"	Steve Bookbinder	Gil Brailey	14 February 1999	9.93
It is the morning after the night before, and Chris realises that Lisa did not come home. She's at Recall's, discussing how much she hates her dad. Chris speaks to Sally to apologise. Sally explains that Yvonne wanted to join the brigade, but was not accepted. Chris says Yvonne was a fling. A shout comes in for a flooded house. The female home owner recognises George from the charity calendar, and her husband says George's page has been up for months, even though his month has long gone. The crew lift up the paving slabs in the garden to find the stopcock, while the wife flirts with George and asks if George would come and do the grand opening of her beauty salon. George politely declines, but Joe offers his services. Everyone gets back on the pump. Back at Blackwall, Sicknote is ringing around and trying to find Jean. Pearce asks Dan to go for a drink so that they could chat. At the end of the shift, Sally asks Sicknote if he's okay, but he confides in her that Jean's left him. Maggie tells Joe that if things do not work out with Jackie, he's welcome back at hers. Joe looks on, miserable. Lisa arrives home, and Yvonne leaves Chris's. Lisa apologises for disappearing and says she was at Recall's. Chris is fuming, especially when Lisa says she wishes Recall was her father. Sally finds Jean, and tells her Bert confessed Jean had gone away, and he was worried. Sally asks Jean if its what she really wants. Sally tells Jean that her parents were determined to give her a brother or sister, and all the trying just split them up. They laugh about the silly adventures of Sicknote. At the pub, Pearce tells Dan not to get too close to one member of the watch, who he refers to as "Miss Fields". Chris invites Recall over, and Recall says nothing happened. Chris tells Recall he's finding it difficult suddenly having a family. Lisa listens in, and hears her Dad say sometimes he wishes he did not have a family. Recall goes to see Jack and tells him to come back to work. At the hospital, Sicknote is helping out in the wards when Jean arrives. Jeans tells him it would be different with other people, and they both say they did not want to be with other people. The Quigley marriage is back on track. At a children's home called Milbrook House, a teenage boy, Kevin, leaves with his pet rat in a cage. At Sally's, Yvonne has cooked dinner. Sally asks Yvonne why she hid her relationship with Chris. Sally tells Yvonne that Chris told her it was over. Yvonne tells Sally that Chris has not told her that its over, and she will come to the station tomorrow and prove it. Sure enough, she arrives at the station at the start of the shift the next morning, and asks Chris when they're going out. Chris tells Yvonne their relationship is a big mistake and cannot happen. He walks away. Sally arrives and Yvonne turns on her. In the mess, Pitbull continues to go on about Recall and Lisa, but turns his attention to Jack when he arrives. George chips in, and tells Jack he's a drama queen. Chris and Jack talk in his office, and Jack tells Chris he's better. Back at the children's home, Kevin, his rat and his friend Jason buzz themselves in, and forget to shut the door. With Jack out of the room, the other members of the watch chat about Jack. Pearce and George have worries about Jack's mental health. Joe invites Maggie round for dinner. Dan and Sally are in the yard, discussing Yvonne, and how uncomfortable it will be living with her now. Dan says Sally can move in with him, and she says she will think about it. Joe interrupts, asking what Sally and Dan saw. Joe asks if Sally's planning on moving in with Dan, and Sally says she is, and that Joe's to keep his nose out of her business. Chris finds Recall and tells him that he does not blame him for what Lisa does. Recall talks to Jack about how he's feeling, then a shout comes in for Millbrook House, the children's home where Kevin was. Kevin is still inside the building, and does not want to come out because he reckons he will be blamed for the fire. Recall brings him down. Kevin suddenly realises he's left his rat inside, and runs back into the burning building. Recall runs after him and finds him. They shout for help and Jack sends over a ladder. Jack and Kevin escape the burning room, and Jack goes back for Recall, rescuing him from the smoky room. Chris tells Jack that he's not in trouble. At Jackie's flat, Jackie is just out of the bath when Maggie arrives. Joe has clearly not told Jackie that Maggie was coming for dinner. They argue, and Jackie says he's done it to get back at her. After dinner, Jackie tells Maggie that Joe raves about her cooking all the time, and Maggie is embarrassed. Lisa shows up at Recall's, and Recall tells her to go away, but she pushes her way in. She is dressed up. At Chris', Chris is asleep on the sofa. Lisa arrives home, soaking wet and tearful. She says nobody understands her and everyone patronises her. She tells Chris she stayed at Recall's again, and Chris is not pleased.
131	15	"Episode 15"	Steve Finn	Tony Lindsay	21 February 1999	10.82
After a disastrous drill with the new BA, Chris asks Pearce how well he knows Recall. Pearce defends Recall, and asks why Chris is asking, but Chris walks away. The other clean the equipment and tease Joe, who reflects the teasing onto Recall's lack of success in the romance department. Pearce goes back to see Chris and asks if there is something he should know, so Chris tells him he thinks Lisa's got herself into trouble because of Recall. Again, Pearce defends Recall, but Chris insists that Recall must be behind Lisa's upset. Joe teases Recall about having relations with Lisa, and Chris interrupts, insisting on knowing the answer. He demands to see Recall in his office, where he blames Recall for Lisa's mood the previous night. Recall tells Chris that whatever has happened is nothing to do with work. Recall goes to the mess, and tells everyone that Lisa came round and he sent her away. After the shift, everyone goes to the pub to support Recall, except Sally who says she has to go home and face Yvonne. Chris tells Recall he will not let him get away with "this". Recall goes to Chris's to speak to Lisa, and Chris shows up with the police, who say they're investigating a complaint Chris has made. Recall is taken away. The police try to get Lisa to tell them what happened, but Lisa says nothing happened. Chris keeps asking Lisa why she will not tell them the truth, certain Recall has done something to her. At the pub, Fiona arrives to see Pearce. He invites her to sit with the boys. Just then, another man shows up. Fiona tells him – Barry – to go away. Barry goes up to Pearce and punches him. Jaffa throws Barry out. At Jack's the intercom buzzer goes, and it is Stephen and Linda. Linda tells Jack that Stephen wants Jack's blessing for his new life in America. Back at the pub, Fiona and Pearce tend to Pearce's bloodied nose. Fiona tells him that her relationship with Barry is over, and invites Pearce back to her hotel. At Chris's, Chris apologises to the police, and Recall is in his living room. Chris apologises to Recall, and Recall says he needs to get to know his daughter. At Sally's flat, Yvonne comes home and finds Sally and Dan taking some of her stuff back to Dan's. They argue, and Sally leaves. George goes to a gym, run by a lady named Charlie, who's looking for a boxing tutor for her son. They get on well. Chris goes to see Lisa, and apologises for his behaviour. Lisa tells him she is going back to her mother's house. At Joe's, the doorbell rings and it is Yvonne – she is very drunk. Joe answers and asks her what she is doing. Yvonne tells Joe Sally's left him, and he knows how that feels. Jackie looks on, confused. Yvonne says she knows Sally's not interested in Dan, and they both know it. Jackie asks Joe what is going on, but Joe cannot answer. At the Quigley's, they look at some of the bits they would bought for the baby, and decide to put it into an album of memories. Fiona and Geoff are having a drink at her hotel, and share a toast to home. Fiona tells Pearce she's only come to London for him, and Pearce says he's flattered. She tells Pearce she is leaving the hotel at 7pm, and she will know what it means if he cannot see her before then. The next morning, Sally is late for work when Jackie pulls up and offers her a lift. Jackie asks more a more probing questions, trying to find out what Sally's intentions are towards Joe. It becomes very uncomfortable, and Jackie pulls up at the station as Joe arrives. Dan arrives, unaware. Jackie tells Dan they have both been naïve with people they thought were friends. Sally walks off, Dan follows her. Jack tells Recall that Stephen and Linda have left for America, with his blessing. Recall tells everyone that the business with Lisa and Chris is finally over. Sally goes to see Joe and tells him to keep his girlfriend under control. Joe tells her that she needs to keep Yvonne under control. She tells Joe "There is no me and you", and Joe agrees. Sally goes to see Dan, and makes it up to him by letting him take her for dinner. Elsewhere, in a queue of traffic, an impatient driver pulls out of a traffic jam and shoots off at high speed. Two horse riders, one adult and one teenager, are enjoying a ride through London, when the driver shoots up behind them and crashes into a reversing diesel tanker. One horse rider is thrown off her horse. Yvonne shows up at the station, and Sally asks why Yvonne went to Joe's. Sally tells Yvonne she is moving on and to leave her alone. A shout comes in, and Sally walks away from Yvonne. Blue Watch arrive at the accident and are confronted with leaking diesel, the woman in her car, a runaway horse and a frantic driver. It turns out that the woman in the car is the young rider's biological mother, and the other rider was her stepmother. The girl refuses to go with her biological mother. George tries to calm the horse while Sicknote deals with the stepmother. Pearce gives the biological mother first aid, while she sobs about how she let her daughter go with her father when her marriage broke down. Everyone heads back to the station, only to find the DO waiting for them. Sicknote tells Chris that he'd be happy to take on the Schools Liaison Officer role. The DO tells Chris that he will not be recommending him for promotion after all, in light of the Terry scenario. It is the end of the shift, and everyone heads out as White Watch take over. Fiona is waiting for Pearce and kisses him as everyone looks on. Dan and Sally watch Jackie and Joe kissing by her car. Sally overhears White Watch's shout – it is her flat on fire.
132	16	"Episode 16"	Gareth Milne	Tony Lindsay	28 February 1999	11.38

=== Series 12 (2000) ===
No. overall	No. in series	Title	Directed by	Written by	Original release date	UK viewers (millions)
133	1	"Episode 1"	Nigel Douglas	Jonathan Rich	9 January 2000	10.72
The watch is called to evict a bunch of drunk medical students stuck up a ship's mast. Recall says Jack has left for America to be with Stephen. He goes up the ladder to bring the students down. Elsewhere, the fire alarms are going off at The Bentley Hotel. Customers are angry, so the manager shuts off the alarm. At Blackwall, George and Sally are worrying over lost equipment. Joe picks an argument with Sally. Hi-Ho and Carmen from Shadbrook arrive with the lost equipment. Blue Watch tease the Shadbrook crew as they drive off. Sicknote tells everyone that the fostering application has gone well. In the locker room, Joe opens his locker and loads of ladies' toiletries fall out. Joe explains that he's selling it to make some extra money in a pyramid scheme. At the hotel, the alarm goes off again, and the manager shuts it off at the mains because an electrician will not come until later. The bellboy tells him that's not a good idea because there is a party in the basement, but the manager just sneers. His daughter goes out for the evening, to a club. At Blackwall, Chris asks Joe and Sally why they're constantly arguing, and says that would be even worse than if they were having a relationship. Joe and Sally deny everything. In the corridor outside Chris's office, it becomes obvious that the arguing is just a ruse – they're definitely together, and very happy about it. Sally goes to see Maggie, and confesses to her that she and Joe are struggling to keep the pretence up. The manager's daughter, Leanne, brings her boyfriend back to the hotel, where they hide out together in a room which is closed for decorating. Joe goes to see Dan and thanks him for not grassing them to Pearce or Chris. Dan says there is no hard feelings, Joe got the girl and life goes on. A shout comes in to a post office, but it turns out to be an overcooked piece of toast which set the alarms off. To make things worse, Shadbrook is there. Outside the Bentley Hotel, a van loses control and crashes, leaking diesel everywhere. The bellboy goes to call the fire brigade and evacuate the party in the basement, but the partygoers ignore him. On the way back to Blackwall, the appliances are called to the hotel. Sally and Dan are delighted because it means overtime pay. Sicknote is annoyed because it means he will miss his fostering meeting. Back at the hotel, the hotel staff are knocking on room doors to see if anyone is inside. The manager's daughter keeps quiet. Joe, Sally, Dan and George go to evacuate the basement party, and just get everyone out in time, when one of the partygoers flicks a lighted cigarette which sends the diesel up in flames. Leanne opens her hotel room door and sees the place is on fire. Chris sends Pearce and George in to rescue Leanne. Shadbrook arrive to help. Chris and the ADO Chapman watch from a control vehicle. With Leanne rescued, Pearce says he thinks there are more people inside. The receptionist confirms that some people are missing. Sally, Joe, Sicknote and Recall go in with BA. Pearce and George are at hospital, when Fiona arrives and offers to sit with them. A woman approaches them in their beds, and asks if her little boy has been found. Pearce calls Chris and asks. The BA crew go through rooms, and find the missing bell boy. They're winding down, when Chris comes over and asks if they definitely checked all the rooms. Recall thinks they did, but he and Chris go back in to double check. Sure enough, they find the boy. The hotel manager comes over and confronts Recall. He follows Recall as he walks away, and calls Recall a murderer. Off-camera, we hear a scuffle and the manager falls down, shouting that Recall hit him. Everyone comes over, and Chris asks Recall if he really did hit the manager. Recall denies it, so Chris calls out to ask if anyone saw what happened. No-one can answer...
134	2	"Episode 2"	Nigel Douglas	Graham Mitchell	16 January 2000	10.75
Sally and Joe wake up together and walk to Blackwall. They nearly get run over by a motorcyclist. George is being visited in hospital by Kelly. At the station, the same motorcyclist pulls up and introduces himself as Jack's replacement, Firefighter Sharp. At the hospital, Recall meets the mother of the young boy, Liam, who was pulled out at the last minute. He confesses to her that he missed her son when her was doing his search. At the yard, the watch are doing drills, and Joe absent-mindedly looks away from the hose and soaks Sharp and his bike. Chris is unimpressed, but goes to chat to Recall about Liam. Chris tells Recall that the hotel manager, Mr Graves, has made a complaint about Recall. Pearce is discharged from hospital, and Fiona proposes to him, but Pearce says he cannot give her an answer. George, listening in from his side of the curtain, chuckles. Recall goes to find Sicknote and asks him if he will make a statement, but Sicknote says he did not witness anything. Recall then goes to Sally, and asks her to be a witness, but she also says she witnessed nothing. DO Griggs arrives to discuss the complaint about Recall. Firefighter Sharp tells them he was known as Hyper at his last station because of his surname, and that he was a junkie. They're not sure if he's kidding or not. Joe rounds up Sally and Sicknote, and tries to get them to make statements to exonerate Recall. Chris defends Recall to the DO. A shout comes in for the pump, but Sally and Sicknote, who were manning the ladder, have been told to stay behind by Chris. Sally gives her statement, and says she cannot say if Recall hit Mr Graves or not. The pump crew make it to a flooded flat, where water is pouring through the ceiling from the flat above. The female resident says "Her upstairs", Linda, is probably entertaining men again. Joe, Dan and Hyper go into Linda's flat, and find water pouring out of the bathroom. The open the bathroom door and find Linda in the bath with a man, who turns out to be the complainant's son. George arrives at an empty Blackwall, and decided to mess about on the station's PA system – he announces Pearce's engagement. The DO is not impressed, and neither is Chris, who tells George off. Sicknote gives his statement, but says he does not want to be part of the witch hunt. The pump arrives back at Blackwall. George greets Hyper and they talk bikes. Hyper offers to start the bike up for George, but Joe has put a musical horn in it. At the Pearce house, Fiona is angry about Pearce's indecision, not helped by Kelly ringing and congratulating them. Hi-Ho speaks to Joe about his cosmetics business, and bets him £50 he can sell all of it by the end of the day. Recall is interviewed, and states that Graves has a problem with the brigade after they caught him violating safety procedures. DO Griggs tells Recall that he's not suspended, but the investigation will go ahead. Fiona and Kelly are at the pub, discussing their men. Fiona suggests Kelly tries a college course. Hi-Ho gives Joe £100 for the cosmetics, but Joe said they were worth £200. Hi-Ho says Joe never told him that. A shout comes in for a fire at a squat under a railway bridge, and everyone leaves, Joe driving one pump and Recall driving the ladder. Recall goes a different way to Joe. Joe arrives first, and Recall gets stuck at a dead end. Chris is unimpressed. One of the squatters reports a lady trapped in a burning container, and the BA crew go in, but the lady then turns up outside. Sicknote apologises to Recall for any misunderstanding. DO Griggs turns up at the fire scene, and tells Chris that Liam died. He tells Recall.
135	3	"Episode 3"	Steve Finn	Len Collin	23 January 2000	10.17
It is a new day at Blackwall, and the pump ladder, doing fire safety checks, runs over a phone which a man has dropped from a window cleaner's cradle on the side of a tall office block. Joe speaks to Sicknote about the arrival of his foster child. Sally, Recall and Hyper are doing drills in the yard with Pearce. They ask Pearce about his wedding, but he brushes them off. On the roof, Chris hears singing. It turns out to be Max Harris from accounts, dressed in a gorilla suit and handcuffed to the cradle. Chris jumps into the cradle, but it just breaks the supporting wire on one side and Chris dangles precariously. Max tells Chris that he will get married that afternoon. Chris removes the handcuffs, and tells Max that Dan will pull him to safety. Suddenly, the cradle crashes down towards Sally on the ground, and Sicknote pushes her to safety. Chris and Max are dangling on ropes and get pulled to safety. Max is picked up by his friends and heads to the church. At the station, everyone teases Chris about being 007. Joe asks Sally to come and meet his brother. Recall says he's standing down as union rep, and Dan is appointed in his place. Dan finds Pearce and Pitbull doing some gardening, and they confess that they're working together to win the Best Kept Station competition. Shadbrook arrive early for training and Pearce tells them that Shadbrook does not stand a chance in the Best Kept Station competition. They leave some compost for Pitbull to use. Carmen from Shadbrook flirts with Dan. Pearce's pump crew gets called to a shout – it is Max Harris again, and this time his mate has got his hand glued to the car door. Pearce has a go at Max for essentially wasting the brigade's time and says he does not want to see them again. He also mutters that he will not be having a wedding. At the end of the shift, George goes home to find a babysitter looking after his kids. She tells him Kelly's gone to a meeting about college courses. George goes after Kelly, but she tells him to leave her alone so he goes to Andie's gym. At a jazz club, Joe and his brother wait for Sally. Kelly goes home alone, and Chris comes to see her. She tells Chris that she wants some education, and Chris tells her she has a lot going for her. He goes to see George and tells him not to let Kelly's desire for education come between them. At the jazz club, Eddie tells Joe the singer is a "fit bird". Joe turns around and it is Sally. At the pub, Maggie is doing terrible karaoke and is carried off by Hyper and Recall. Pearce tells Fiona he cannot marry her. Fiona walks into the street and shouts to everyone that she loves Pearce and she intends to marry him. She challenges Pearce to do the same, and he does. At the Quigleys', they discuss the imminent arrival of Owen, the foster child. On the way home from the jazz club, Joe compliments Sally on her singing. The next morning, Owen arrives with his social worker and runs from the car, straight into Sicknote and his pint of milk.
136	4	"Episode 4"	Philippa Langdale	Clive Dawson	30 January 2000	10.10
Sicknote tidies away a dish full of cigarettes from Owen's bedroom. Pearce and Dan find their hanging baskets full of dead flowers, and conclude that Shadbrook have given them poisoned compost. Maggie has been for an interview for a cleaning post at the station. Pearce tells everyone he and Fiona have named the day for their wedding. Owen shows up at Blackwall and asks for a tour. A shout comes in to a mortuary where a briefcase is handcuffed to a corpse. Hyper picks the lock and opens the case, and red anti-theft paint sprays out. Chris tells Maggie she did not get the cleaning job as everyone gets back to the mess, and they all console her. Zoe opens the door to Kelly at the Pearce's house, but Fiona just introduces her as a student, not her daughter. A shout comes in as Joe and Sally try to convince Hyper to try one of Joe's cosmetic products to cover the red paint. The shout turns out to be a scorned woman, Debbie, throwing golf clubs from a second floor flat balcony, whose cheating husband ran off with their kids. Debbie comes to the door with a petrol can, and Pearce orders everyone to stand back. Sally stays and tries to befriend Debbie, telling her that her dad took her away from her mum as a child. Dan's experiment on Maggie's healthy plant in the suspect compost confirms his fears that Shadbrook have poisoned their plants. Debbie goes back into her flat telling Sally she is going to get a photo of her kids to show her, as she picks the photos up which are next to the gas central heating boiler, the timer goes on, lights up and the whole place goes up in flames. Sally is upset, and Pearce disapprovingly watches Joe console her. Chris tells her to go home in the engine without Joe, along with Hyper, George, Pearce and Dan. Dan suggests that they pay a visit to Shadbrook. Pearce and George cause a distraction while Hyper steals Shadbrook's plants. Rosie, the new cleaner, arrives. She's young, blonde and attractive. The men are impressed. Rosie asks Chris is he's free for a date, but he declines. After the shift, George gets home to find Kelly's invited her college class round for tea. He decides to go out to the casino with the rest of the lads while Kelly stays home and gets drunk. Sicknote gets home, and Jean says she heard Owen came to visit the station and he had a nice time. At Joe's, Sally says she wants to go out for the evening, not stay in with Joe's brother. Joe tells a sulking Sally she should go out by herself, so she goes to the casino too. George cheers Sally up and tells her she should not take Debbie's actions to heart, then goes to play roulette. A blonde man buys Sally a drink at the bar, and they leave the casino together. Hyper and Recall bond over Recall's feelings of being squeezed out of the brigade. Sally and the blonde stranger are kissing outside the casino, and Sally is suddenly overcome by guilt and confesses she is in a relationship. Back in the casino, a drunk George cannot even stand up, so Chris takes him home. Kelly makes him carry George upstairs, then kisses Chris as a drunk George passes out. Sally gets home and finds an answerphone message from Joe, who says he loves her. She sinks to the floor.
137	5	"Episode 5"	Crispin Reece	Doug Briggs	6 February 2000	10.07
At the Green house, Kelly makes breakfast for a hungover George. Walking to work, Joe asks Sally why she is in a mood, but she treats him coolly. George thanks Chris for taking him home and calming Kelly down. Rosie meets Pitbull, and after he uses some bad chat up lines, she tips water down his trousers. It is the day of Recall's trial, and his solicitor says it is an easy win, but Recall is dubious. On a building site, a workman climbs into a wooden container which is partly underground, when suddenly the timbers give way, and the workman and his colleagues are buried under the soil which floods in. Blue Watch, minus Recall, Sicknote and Chris, head to the scene. With Hyper at the dentist, they have to call on Shadbrook for support. Back at Blackwall, Rosie tries to put some shelves up and drills through a water pipe. Hyper gets back from the dentist and fixes it. At the building site, Sally, Dan, Joe and Pearce dig out the survivors. Pearce uncovers another ventilation shaft with a trapped builder inside. Pearce and Sally slide into the gap, with Joe holding the other end of the rope. Recall arrives for his hearing, and Liam Kennedy's parents are waiting. Inside, DO Griggs tells Chris "If things don't work out, no hard feelings". At the site, the guilty site manager drives his digger towards the scene, causing the remaining wooden planks lining the shaft to vibrate dangerously. The planks give way, burying Sally, Pearce, and Tony the builder. Joe and George dig at the dirt and uncover Sally, but Pearce and Terry are still missing. Pearce and Tony are crawling through the service tunnels. At Recall's trial, Chapman watches Liam's parents argue about what they hope to achieve. Griggs interviews Sicknote, who tells them he did not see Recall hit Mr Graves. Liam's mother tells Liam's father that he needs to tell them the truth. At the building site, George and Joe head down another ventilation shaft to rescue Pearce and Tony. Suddenly, a blast of water knocks Joe down, and further down the tunnel, knocks over Tony and Pearce. Pearce drags Tony back to the surface. At Recall's trial, Mr Graves is giving evidence and calls Recall incompetent. Recall's solicitor accuses Mr Graves of looking for a scapegoat. Griggs tells Recall he probably did not like the pressure Mr Graves put him under, and suggests to Recall that he hit Mr Graves. Recall says at worse, he pushed Graves, but did not punch him. At the site, George finds Pearce. Back in the trial, it is summing up time, and Griggs is trying to portray Recall as a man with a temper, but the judge appears to be siding with Recall. At the site, Pearce takes Tony to hospital in the fire engine. The trial closes, and the judge finds Recall guilty, and fires him from the brigade. Recall goes back to Blackwall and clears his locker. He exits just as the rest of the watch get back. They all watch Recall walk away from Blackwall.
138	6	"Episode 6"	Steve Finn	Len Collin	13 February 2000	9.57
It is the day of the judging for the Best Kept Station. Pitbull goes to a DIY store for compost and finds Recall working there. He winds him up. At Blackwall, the others discuss the best way to show support for Recall. Pearce does not want to do anything, but Dan says they will organise a petition. Joe gets Sally's make-up bag out of his locker and is caught by Pearce. He just says "It's my girlfriend's", but Pearce looks on sceptically. At the Green house, Kelly is screening phone calls when Chris calls. She calls back and says she must see him. Pearce goes to see Chris to tell him about Joe and Sally, but Chris just tells him to monitor it. Joe tells Sally he thinks Pearce is onto them, but Sally laughs it off. Rosie starts flirting with Joe as Pearce walks by, so Joe plays along and flirts with her for Pearce's benefit. Pearce goes to ask Dan if Sally and Joe are together, but Dan plays dumb. A shout comes in for a traffic accident involving a lorry load of chickens, and saves Dan. Sicknote is asked to round up the loose chickens. At the DIY shop, Recall is struggling to fit in. Back at the scene of the fire, Joe gets attached to a chicken, and names it Clucky. Pearce confronts Sally and tells her the brigade "Frowns on firefighters fraternising". Sally plays dumb. At Blackwall, the judging begins, and Carmen from Shadbrook confronts Dan over the stolen plants. As ADO Chapman announces the results, Pitbull reveals he's been to see the judge and told her that Shadbrook poisoned their plants. Lewisham are announced as the winners, with Blackwall and Shadbrook disqualified for bad behaviour. Dan asks Carmen if she'd like to go out now the competition is over. At the Quigleys', Jean tells Sicknote to stop having a go at Owen after she finds some stolen clothes. Chris and Kelly go to a pub, and see Recall, who ask if George is with her. Kelly makes excuses about being out without her husband. Joe asks Sally to move in, but she says they need to be careful because Pearce might be on to them. Recall tells Chris he does not think he wants his job back. Chris asks Kelly to stay the night. At Blackwall, Rosie asks Joe if he wants to go out, and Joe says he could not possibly date someone he works with. Sicknote discusses how to discipline Owen with Hyper, George and Pearce. George invites Sicknote to bring Owen to his boxing club. Rosie is sobbing on Maggie's shoulder about Joe's rejection, and tells Maggie men are intimidated by her. They get back to the station and find Rosie screaming the place down because she's seen a rat. She is sent to Chris, who tells her she is on her last chance. Rosie angrily storms out. Zoe turns up at Pearce's house and asks for Fiona. She asks Pearce to give Fiona "An essay" in an envelope, and says she is just a student. Sally goes to see Recall and tells him about her relationship with Joe. Recall says Liam Kennedy's dad knows more than he's letting on, but he's not going to speak to him because he just wants to give up the responsibility of firefighting. Sally tells Recall he should try to get his job back. At the boxing club, Owen fights a girl but faints. They go out for a KFC afterwards and bond a bit. At Dan's, Carmen arrives for their date, but tells him she is glad they're mates before leaving when her pager goes off. As she leaves, she kisses him. The next day, George wakes up with Kelly. Kelly looks out of the bedroom window, and Chris is parked outside their house.
139	7	"Episode 7"	Gareth Milne	Mike Bailey	20 February 2000	9.82
A baliff comes to a door to remind a tenant and her young squatters they have 2 hours to leave the rented house they're in, which has been sold to a property developer. Joe calls Sally, but she does not answer. An elderly lady in the house chains herself to a sofa in the rented house and starts looking through old photos. Other squatters start throwing petrol bombs, but one slips out of their hands and rolls under the floor boards in the attic. Blue watch arrive, and Sicknote finds the old lady. Pearce asks Dan to be his best man at his wedding to Fiona. The stranger who Sally kissed at the casino approaches her and asks if she wants to go on a date. Joe angrily interrupts, but Chris sees and tells Sally and Joe to sort out whatever's happening between them. At the Quigleys', Sicknote and Owen listen to his old records. Pearce tries on suits for his wedding while Dan sits around and watches, bored. At the station, Sally asks Joe why he's ignoring her. The watch are unimpressed with what a journalist wrote about their handling of the eviction of the old lady. Maggie shows Pearce the wedding cake she's made for his wedding. Pearce announces that Dan's going to be best man. Kelly organises Fiona's hen night, but Zoe shows up at the bar. Griggs comes to see Chris and says DO Chapman has moved on, so now he's in charge, and Chris' promotion has been confirmed – but not as Blackwall commander, to the Fire Safety offices. Chris is furious. Recall goes to see Liam Kennedy's dad, and asks him if he'd speak to the brigade discipline and to tell them Recall did not hit Graves. Mr Kennedy is dismissive at first, but they get talking and Mr Kennedy agrees to help. At the hen party, the watch wives gossip and get drunk with an Elvis impersonator, before deciding to go and "fin some decent blokes". Kelly says she knows just the place. At Blackwall, George laments the lack of romance between him and Kelly since they had children to Sicknote. Sally tries to talk to Joe, but he will not accept what she says. The drunk wives show up at Blackwall just as Pearce models his suit for the rest of the watch. Hyper opens the door, and the ladies force their way in. The rest of the watch hear the cacophony and go to investigate. The find the women undressing Hyper. Kelly and Chris sneak off. Pearce tells Fiona off. The rest of the girls lock themselves in a fire engine. Meanwhile, a police car is chasing a motorbike, which loses control and crashes, sliding under a fire engine. The women are put into a taxi, sobered up by events. Fiona and Kelly chat, and Kelly tells Fiona it is okay to not tell your husband everything – she does not tell George everything. The motorcyclist turns out to be female. Sally tries to talk to Joe again, and they agree that since neither of them want to leave Blue Watch, they have to stop seeing each other. Fiona tells Kelly about Zoe being her daughter.
140	8	"Episode 8"	Claire Winyard	Julie Wassmer	27 February 2000	10.21
It is a new day at Blackwall, and Recall is back on the watch. Hyper is busy booking a fireman strip-o-gram for Pearce's stag do. Chris gives Pearce a present – The Joy Of Sex. A shout comes in to a house with smoke reported and both engines go out. They find an elderly man who is mumbling about his wife, and a cat. Dan goes back in to find the wife, but there is a massive explosion. Dan is uninjured. Joe finds a photo of the elderly couple on their wedding day. At the Pearce house, Pearce is avidly reading Chris' present until Fiona comes home. Sicknote arrives and asks Pearce out for a drink. He sees Chris' present and teases him about being a stickler for training opportunities. Sicknote takes Pearce to the pub where everyone is waiting. Old Blue Watch member Kevin is there and buys a cocktail for Pearce. At the station, Chris is clearing his belongings before heading to Pearce's stag do. He calls Kelly and asks to see her, but Kelly refuses. The strip-o-gram "Harry The Hose" arrives and Pearce dances along on stage. Zoe turns up at Pearce's house and asks Fiona why she's not told Pearce she has a daughter. Clingfilm arrives and gives Geoff a new doorbell. The stripper leaves Hyper his card, but Joe tells him to take his card back. Pearce entrusts Dan with the wedding ring. Chris takes George home for a cup of tea. Kelly appears, and Chris asks where he stands, but leaves before she answers. Sicknote gets home and sees Owen has drawn graffiti all over the living room wall, with Jean's consent. Pearce gets home and walks in on Fiona and Zoe hugging. Zoe runs out, and Fiona tells Pearce the truth, but he walks out. The next day, he bumps into Zoe who gives him a letter to give Fiona. Dan wakes up at Carmen's and has breakfast with her kids. Sicknote takes Owen to the hospital radio station, and while Sicknote steps out, Owen takes over presenting. At the Pearce's, Fiona tells Kelly the wedding is cancelled. Pearce gets home and they make up and go to the registry office. Carmen cleans her house, and finds Pearce's wedding ring which fell out of Dan's jacket. Kelly loans Fiona hers and they walk down the aisle. Maggie tells Joe "She looks so beautiful", but Joe only has eyes for Sally. Carmen, stuck in traffic, tries to get to the registry office to hand over the ring. She charges in to the registry office just in time. Fiona throws her bouquet, and Sally catches it. Maggie hands Fiona a horse shoe, from Zoe, who is watching across the park. Chris tells Pearce that he's leaving today and to tell the others. Kelly overhears. Sally sings "The Rose" with the wedding band and looks at Joe the whole time. Kelly and Chris dance together and he asks her to come with him to his new posting but she refuses. Everyone heads outside the reception venue to see Blue Watch's surprise present. A helicopter is waiting to give Fiona and Pearce a surprise ride. The helicopter takes off and everyone waves. George sees Kelly kissing Chris and is shocked.
141	9	"Episode 9"	Philippa Langdale	Stephen Leather	5 March 2000	10.31
It is a new day for Blue Watch, and Pearce has brought his honeymoon slides. Maggie has a day off, so Dan is on cooking duty. Joe and Hyper comment on George's bad mood. Everyone looks forward to meeting the new governor. Recall arrives for work in a new sports car and trendy clothes, to the amusement of Blue Watch. Pearce has brought Bruno to work and stashed him under the governor's desk. A Morris Minor arrives at Blackwall, with the new governor inside. He introduces himself as John Coleman, but asks Pearce to call him John in private. He tells them Hi-Ho and Carmen from Shadbrook will be based at Blackwall while their appliance bay is being renovated. Everyone goes for training at "The Grotto". Kelly arrives at the Pearce's house to talk about George finding out about her affair. Sicknote, Dan and Recall take part in a wade through foam. Carmen shows how to use the high ladder to make an escape harness. Hi Ho winches Joe into the air for a laugh. Joe and Hi Ho have a race up the ladders and Hi Ho soaks Joe. They race to be the first to put their ladder away, but Blackwall's ladder nearly hits Coleman. Coleman tells them all off for making it into a competition, and warns Dan not to slip up again. Recall consoles Dan as they head back to Blackwall to watch Pearce's slides. Joe says he's added something special to the slide display. Hyper and Joe volunteer to be Sally's backing group, and perform "Tragedy" by Steps. Coleman sees them. He laughs. Sicknote asks Pearce is he could leave a bit early to say goodbye to Owen, whose parents are coming to collect him. Pearce says no. Coleman sees Bruno under the desk and says he cannot stay. The watch have lunch while Coleman gets settled into his office. He puts up a photo of him meeting the Queen. Pearce puts his slide show on while they eat lunch. Joe's surprise slide of naked women appears and everyone cheers. A shout comes in for the pump only, and Coleman insists on going instead of Pearce. The shout turns out to be a skip on fire, started by two young boys. Sicknote, now more confident with kids, speaks to the boys. Above a taxi office, in a room which evidently doubles as a drug dealing den, a young man arrives for work. When the pump gets back, the watch are waiting for Recall, where they hold a cremation ceremony for Recall's favourite old anorak. A fight breaks out at the drug den, and the young man falls onto a bunsen burner. Soon, he and the building are alight. He runs into the road and is knocked over by a lorry. Several cars crash as a result. The pump is called. DO Griggs arrives to see Coleman. Griggs asks Coleman his opinion on Sicknote, Recall and Sally and he is positive about them all. At the drug den, two people remain in the burning room, trapped. They break a hole through the plasterboard, but one goes back for the drugs. Pearce, Sicknote, Dan, Recall and Sally arrive and the traffic accident is worse than reported. Dan calls for backup and the rest of Blue Watch attend. Sally revives the young man, who says his name is Jimmy. When the paramedic rolls Jimmy, Sally sees bad burns on his back. Sally realises the building he came from must be alight inside. Sicknote's casualty, Claire, comes round. Pearce cannot work out which building is alight. He goes into the taxi office, but the drug dealer intercepts them and sends them away, saying it is storage rooms upstairs, not people. They walk away, but Sally points to the fire coming out of the skylight. George, John, Joe and Hyper head to the scene. The two trapped men start to panic. Sally evacuates the nearby shops, one of which is full of paint cans and explodes. The episode finishes as the shop explodes.
142	10	"Episode 10"	Philippa Langdale	Stephen Leather	30 April 2000	8.11
After the explosion, there is chaos at the scene. With Coleman, Pearce works out that the fire must be above the taxicab office. Inside the drug den, the Jason and Davey are still trying to escape without being seen by the police or fire brigade. The BA crew reach the seat of the fire. Outside the building, a police officer asks Recall out on a date, and he accepts. Jason and Davey find an open hatch and start to make their escape. Coleman sends Joe and Dan back inside to ensure the fire is out. They hear Davey shout, and find Jason and Davey. The firefighters offer to help them, and Davey stumbles and drops the bag of drugs. Joe notices the drugs and asks what is going on. Suddenly, Jason turns nasty and takes Joe and Dan hostage. When they fail to answer their radios, Coleman sends Sicknote to investigate. Sicknote gets a look but Jason spots him and shoots. Sicknote runs out. Back at the station, Carmen and Hi Ho try to convince Hyper, Recall and George to play them at a game of volleyball, but during the game they smash the wing mirror from Coleman's Morris Minor. At the Quigleys', Owen is packing his stuff. The police negotiator rings Joe's mobile, and speaks to Jason. Jason makes demands, but Dan says he needs to get help for Davey. Sicknote winches a first aid kit up. Joe has a cigarette with Jason while Dan helps Davey. Some embers catch fire, and Joe goes to put the fire out. He turns the hose on Jason and knocks him over. Dan wrestles with Jason, but Joe is held at gunpoint by Davey. At the Quigley house, Owen hears on the news that Blackwall firefighters are being held hostage and calls for Jean. At Blackwall, Hi Ho has used his contacts to get a replacement wing mirror for Coleman's car. A shot is heard from inside the hostage building, and the police go charging in. They arrest the two dealers, and the two firefighters. Coleman vouches for Dan and Joe, and they're let go. At Blackwall, Joe and Dan get a heroes' welcome. Joe revels in the attention, but Dan goes to Carmen for a chat. Sicknote gets home to a delighted Owen and Jean. Joe goes to see Coleman, who tells him off for having a mobile phone, but says he's proud of what he did. Coleman calls Dan over and asks if he's okay. Dan says he is. Everyone goes to the pub for a game of darts. Dan tells Joe he's thinking of asking Coleman to demote him to being a regular firefighter, and not Leading Hand. Coleman arrives and asks if anyone's been fiddling with his car. He then proceeds to beat them all at darts. George goes home and accuses Kelly of having an affair with Hammond. She says it was just a kiss goodbye. At the pub, Joe's brother is drunk and tells Sally that Joe's a hero. Kelly goes to see Fiona and confesses she had "a fling". Owen waits for his parents to come, but finds out that they have changed their mind about wanting him back and he's staying with the Quigleys. A tearful Pearce gives Bruno up to a dogs' home. Recall goes on his date with the policewoman. Kelly gets home and finds George has taken his stuff and left. Sally leaves the pub, passing up an offer of a lift home from Coleman. As he drives off, she is mugged.
143	11	"Episode 11"	Steve Finn	Jonathan Rich	7 May 2000	9.55
Coleman asks Sicknote to organise a play. Pitbull asks Pearce where he's left his dog and says he's after a new dog and will take him on. Pearce says no, and checks out other potential homes. George goes to Hyper's house to watch the football, and Hyper invites him to move in. Hyper has another visitor who tell Hyper he cannot run for ever. Sally shows up to work with a black eye, and tells the lads she was mugged. They all offer to defend her if the mugger is seen again. Dan goes to see Coleman and asks to stand down as Leading Hand, and he agrees. Hi Ho asks Joe why he has not got a silly nickname, but a tense Joe turns on him. Coleman arrives just in time to announce Dan's decision. A shout comes in for a capsized pleasure boat, and both engines go off. Pearce and Recall borrow a boat to get closer to the ship. Dan and Hyper jump into the water and swim over, gaining access through a hole in the ship's side. They find 2 people to rescue, one conscious and one not. Dan finds another trapped person, Kim, inside a cabin, but she says she cannot swim. Just then, the ship starts sinking with Dan and Sally still missing. Sally reappears with Kim, but Dan is missing. He appears shortly afterwards, out of breath. Back at Blackwall, Carmen is checking over the ladder. Dan apologises for not telling her he was standing down. Hi Ho continues to wind Joe up about his nickname, and Hi Ho teases him for not being clever. Joe, annoyed at the accusation, goes to see Coleman to ask if he could be considered for Leading Hand. In the mess, George asks Sicknote if he'd go for Leading Hand. Hi Ho laughs at the suggestion, so he and Sicknote arm wrestle to prove Sicknote's not past it. They're about to start when a shout comes in to a vicar stuck on a church roof. Carmen and Hi Ho set off with the ladder. Coleman finds Pearce tending to Bruno in an outbuilding and tells Pearce he cannot keep bringing his dog to work. Coleman asks Hyper if he'd like to be Leading Hand, and Hyper accepts. Joe sulks and tells Sally he wanted that job to prove Hi Ho wrong. He asks Sally if she wants to go for a drink as a friend, and she says she would. Pearce lets Pitbull adopt Bruno. In the mess, George tells the watch about the dodgy people who came to Hyper's house. Pearce backs it up by saying he's overheard Coleman talking to Hyper, and it sounds like Hyper has something to hide. Hyper steps back from the mess door.
144	12	"Episode 12"	Claire Winyard	Len Collin	21 May 2000	9.78
It is a hot day, and Sicknote's play rehearsal is underway. Joe is reluctantly dressed as a battery, and Pearce is "The Fire Bug". Hi Ho reveals a fear of the paranormal, and Joe starts plotting. Pearce confronts Hyper and says they have a mutual friend, who told him Hyper was a bit of a character. Hyper admits they did not see eye-to-eye. Sally tells Pearce to leave Hyper alone. Kelly turns up at Blackwall, asking for George, but he will not see her. Dan asks Carmen if she and her kids would like to go on holiday with him. Pearce starts telling people that Hyper put a man in hospital at his last station. Joe watches Hi Ho teach Sally some self-defence, and has to walk away. Hyper goes to see Coleman, and says "He knows about Bradley". Coleman says people will find out eventually so he may as well tell them, stopping Pearce being able to gossip about it. Hyper goes to Pearce, and tells him he knows what he's up to. George speaks to Kelly, but George just gets angry and tells the rest of the watch about Kelly's affair with Chris. Everyone discusses it over lunch, except Hyper, who is silent. Joe starts talking about ghosts to scare Hi Ho. Coleman announces that Carmen and Hi Ho will be heading back to Shadbrook soon. The plan to scare Hi Ho kicks into full swing, with even Coleman joining in. Hi Ho looks scared. Back at the lunch table, Hyper announces that he's gay. There's silence. Joe laughs at "the joke", but his face turns sour when Hyper says he's serious. Hyper says he will not be forced out this time. A shout comes in to a lift alarm which is going off, and everyone except Sally back away from Hyper. At the shout, Hyper tries to force the doors open, but the lift is stuck between floors. Joe has gone AWOL at the scene. The building caretaker is fiddling with the mechanism. Just as Hyper steps into the lift, he gets the mechanism working, and Hyper's foot is trapped in the cogs at the top of the lift. At Blackwall, George and Recall talk about Kelly and Chris, and George says he's not taking her back. At the scene, Hyper is shouting for help. Joe eventually goes back to the scene. He initially refuses to rescue Hyper, even when Pearce orders him and Sally tells him she cannot believe him. Under order, he goes to get Hyper, but makes it clear he's not happy. Night sets in, and in the dormitory, Hyper tells the story of how Bradley was homophobic, and Hyper's friend beat Bradley up and put him in hospital. He then clarifies he fancies none of the watch, is not into wearing women's clothing, and does not like musicals or being on stage. They decide that using that criteria, Sicknote must be gay. Joe gets out of bed and storms off, calling them all "disgusting". Pearce goes to see Coleman and asks what they're going to do about Hyper being gay. Coleman tells Pearce to stop being silly and sends him away. Hyper goes to see Joe, but Joe cruelly rebuffs him. Hyper asks Joe if he's so defensive because he's gay too, but they're interrupted by Pearce. Joe and Pearce stand in the corridor and say nasty things about Hyper, but Coleman catches them. He tells Pearce off and says if he continues, he will knock Pearce flat. George and Sally go to the gym and work on her self-defence training. George invites Sally to Andie's kickboxing class. Hi Ho joins them and takes over from George. Joe sees what looks like Hi Ho flirting with Sally and is unimpressed. Coleman goes to see Hyper and says he has his support. Hi Ho goes back to bed. George, Joe and Recall set up their paranormal joke. They sit on top of an engine and make ghostly noises. Hi Ho gets out of bed, and Recall dangles a badly constructed puppet from a fishing rod. Hi Ho panics and rings the alarm bell. Everyone is woken up. Joe tells Sally how funny it was, but Sally is angry with Joe. Dan tells Pearce that he should make friends with Hyper. Hi Ho tells Hyper his brother is gay and a policeman. Hyper goes back to the dorm, but picks up his bedding and sleeps alone in the mess instead.
145	13	"Episode 13"	Gareth Milne	Julie Wassmer	4 June 2000	9.48
Pitbull tells Pearce he's adopted Bruno, and renamed him Tyson. Pearce is heartbroken. A shout comes in for people trapped in a cabinet. Sally, George and Joe are left behind and Joe makes a joke about Hyper being trapped in a closet at an old music hall. Sally angrily tells him off. At the music hall, Sicknote falls in love with the architecture. The man in a cabinet is a magician called Marvin, who's locked himself into a chamber. Pearce says it would be easier to reveal how to unlock the cabinet, but Marvin refuses because of the magician's code. At Blackwall, Sally asks a distracted George about the kickboxing class. Pearce phones to report a health and safety violation about the magician. Sicknote gets a guided tour of the music hall from the owner. He puts on a costume and does a performance. Pearce comes back and tells Sicknote off. Marvin is finally released from the box. After the shift, Pearce asks Sicknote if he can help fix his bike. He apologises to Sicknote and says Fiona's not been well. At Hyper's, Hyper tells George that Kelly phoned, but George tells Hyper to butt out. Kelly rings right then, but George only says he will see about taking the kids to the fair. George goes to the gym and sees Sally, Andie and Lenny. Lenny has drawn George some pictures, and says he went to the fair. Sally gets in the ring to spar, but has flashbacks to her mugging and beats her opponent senseless. George and Andie dive in and grab her as she breaks down. Sicknote and Owen are on the computer, looking at pictures of skin problems. Sicknote is trying to diagnose Fiona's illness. Sally runs away from the gym. Andie and Lenny watch George and Sally walk away. Sicknote gives Pearce his diagnosis for Fiona – allergic rhinitis, a cat allergy in particular. Pearce is confused – they do not have a cat. Sally and Joe tease Dan, who's taking a fortnight off to take Carmen and her kids on holiday. Kelly takes the kids to the fair. Two teenage boys run amok, chasing a friend who took their baseball cap. One of them, Mickey, gets drunk on a cheap can of lager. At Blackwall, Dan's mum calls, but a shout comes in – someone is dangling from a ferris wheel. The pump and ladder go out. It turns out to be the drunk teenager, who climbed off his chair and attempted to shimmy across the metal frame. On the other side of the fair, George's daughter, Ruby, sees the fire engine, and runs away from Kelly while her back is turned. The drunk boy loses consciousness and starts falling, but luckily, Sally's tied a rope around him and he can be lowered to the ground. Ruby hides behind the engine and watches the firefighters. Kelly's friend reports Ruby missing to the police, and George overhears the police report over the radio. He goes off to find Ruby. Ruby has spotted a dog and hides with it under the engine. George finds Kelly, and tells her he cannot even trust her with their kids. Joe starts the engine, and the dog runs out. Hyper looks under the engine and sees Ruby. He gives Ruby back to Kelly, and Kelly walks off with her. Dan's mother turns up at his flat and is unimpressed by what she finds. At the end of the shift, everyone goes for a drink, except George who says he has something to do. Recall finds Maggie in the mess, taking loads of potatoes out of the fridge. Coleman offers her a lift home and a drink. They find "Dozy Rosie" working behind the bar at The Ship Aground. At the Pearce house, Fiona admits to Pearce that Sicknote's diagnosis is not wrong – she's been feeding a stray cat. Angry that he gave up Bruno, Pearce stomps off upstairs. At the pub, Maggie tells Rosie she is feeling old. Carmen arrives at Dan's flat, and his mother opens the door. Recall leaves the pub for a date with his policewoman. Joe suddenly remembers Dan's mum said she wanted to come and stay. Dan jumps up and runs home. He finds his mum quizzing Carmen, who cannot get away quickly enough. Carmen tells Dan that she's had a nice time with him, but she needs more commitment than Dan can offer. She leaves him and drives away. George goes back to the family home and apologises to Kelly for saying he could not trust her with the kids. He tells her that he's hiring a solicitor to begin divorce proceedings.
146	14	"Episode 14"	Tania Diez	Jonathan Guy Lewis	11 June 2000	8.69
Blue Watch is doing training drills on an aeroplane. George rescues an air hostess who has genuinely got stuck when her lifejacket got caught on the seat. He is surrounded by admiring females afterwards. Sicknote enthusiastically continues planning his play. He asks Coleman to sign a Secondary Employment form so he can become a taxi driver. Joe tells Sicknote he refuses to act alongside Hyper. Coleman unveils his new toy – a broken wheelbarrow pump which he wants to repair. In the engine on the way back from the drill, Sally and Dan talk about tonight's 70s night. Pearce tells everyone Fiona's found that the source of her allergy was a cat, so Bruno can come home, but Pitbull refuses to give him back. Everyone argues about it. Joe begrudgingly invites Hyper to the 70s night at the end of the shift. George goes home and collects an invitation for his Long Service Medal. He tells Kelly she is a fantastic mum and they'll stay friends, but she still needs to get a solicitor. Dan's mother says she'll give him £10,000 if he leaves the brigade. They argue, just as the rest of the 70s night gang turn up. Joe's brother tells him off for being homophobic. George goes to Andie's gym and asks Lenny if he could sleep there without Lenny telling Andie, but Lenny suggests George stay with them instead. Andie says he can stay as long as he wants. The 70s night gang get to the pub, but the 70s night has been cancelled. Recall is out roller blading with his policewoman. He falls down. At the pub, the 70s gang tease Joe when they find out that there's not been a 70s night for years. Joe and Hyper share a cocktail. Joe's brother, Eddie, pulls the barmaid, Maria, but her ex hangs around and causes trouble until the owner throws him out. He goes home with her while Joe and the others go home. Maria's ex watches them from the shadows. The next day, Coleman tells Joe and Dan that they're being awarded bravery commendations for their actions at the hostage situation. As Eddie and Maria have breakfast, her angry ex sets fire to the pub downstairs. A shout comes in for the pub, and when Joe, driving the pump, realises it is where his brother is, puts his foot down and gets told off by Pearce. Eddie smashes through the window of the flat. Dan, Joe, Sally and Hyper put on BA and go in. Joe finds Eddie and Sally finds Maria. George tells the BA crew to get out of the pub. The paramedics say Eddie will be okay. Joe notices the angry ex loitering and runs after him. He chases him up an old platform of a disused warehouse, and a fight breaks out. Back at the scene, Sally realises Joe has gone missing. She goes after him and kicks the angry boyfriend, sending him flying, before rushing back to tend to Joe. Dan sees them together and smiles.
147	15	"Episode 15"	Susan Tully	Colin Steven	18 June 2000	7.52
Joe, Dan and George are waiting to receive their medals at a ceremony from Griggs. As Griggs talks, Joe keeps turning to sneak glances at Sally. George keeps looking at the door. Awkwardly, both Andie and Lenny arrive, and Kelly with Ruby and Shaun. Shaun interrupts the ceremony. After the ceremony, Griggs tells Coleman that Joe and Dan were just lucky, did not deserve medals, and Blue Watch should enjoy the little time they have left. Joe overhears some of the other fireman gossiping about Coleman, and get them to tell him some juicy stories about Coleman. Andie and Kelly have a passive/aggressive meeting. Recall takes Kelly away and says George and Andie are just friends. Blue Watch go on to Owen's school to perform their play. At the school, Joe spreads the gossip about Coleman's antics. One of the kids creeps out of the back of the theatre, and Owen follows him. He sees that the boy has set a store room alight and runs off. He is spotted running away by a teacher. The school's fire alarm goes off. The children are all evacuated. Owen finds the boy in the playground and they fight. Owen gets the boy to own up, but overhears Sicknote saying he thought Owen was guilty. Blue Watch get a collection together to bribe Pitbull to give Bruno back. Kelly goes to see Fiona and tells her she thinks George and Andie are together. At the gym, Sally jokingly accuses Andie of having a crush on George, and is surprised when she confesses she has. Andie says Sally should understand the temptation, given her situation with Joe, but Andie says she does not believe that it is just platonic. George, Pearce, Hyper, Recall and Dan go to confront Pitbull in The Ship, and use Dozy Rosie as a judge. They offer Pitbull the bribe. At the Quigley house, Jean sends Sicknote to speak to Owen. He gives Owen tickets to a Chelsea match, and Owen is delighted. Pearce gets home, and Zoe is there. Joe goes to see Eddie in the hospital. Eddie laments Maria's death, and says if anyone should know about how it feels to meet The One, Joe should. Joe says nothing can happen while he and Sally are working together. Pearce answers his door to find George and Recall, who've brought Bruno back to him. Fiona and Zoe hint that they would like Zoe to move in, but Pearce does not get the hint. At The Ship, Dan tells Coleman he is avoiding his mother after her bribe to leave the brigade. Fiona flat-out asks Pearce if Zoe can move in, and he agrees. The next day at Blackwall, Maggie is wearing a headscarf. Joe pulls it off, and reveals Maggie has dyed her hair in an attempt to impress Coleman. A shout comes in to an old swimming pool complex where alarms are going off. A look into the empty pool reveals a dead body. Sally and Joe kick open a door and find a badly beaten man, Brett. Just as they get him out, an explosion blasts out. Brett tells the police that he was walking by a heard a scream, then he was tricked into coming inside by two men who beat him up. Just then, a car arrives with a man called Frank, who loiters. Blue Watch put on BA and go back in to put the fire out. They find another man inside. Some sensors flash as they get past the door. Once again, an explosion rings out. Brett is confronted by Frank, who is known to the police for dodgy property deals. It turns out Brett booby-trapped the place. Back at Blackwall, Sally goes to look at Coleman's wheelbarrow motor. She gets it working and asks Coleman to go for a drink. Maggie apologises to Coleman for what he might have overheard in the mess, but he says he heard nothing. Andie welcomes George home, and George says he's taking them all out for dinner. Sally and Joe go to the pub and have several near-kiss moments. Griggs is asked to see Coleman, and asks him what he means about Blue Watch enjoying their limited time together. Coleman accuses Griggs of putting him in to lead Blue Watch as a soft touch so that they could easily claim Blue Watch was deteriorating. Griggs says he's fed up with Coleman disrespecting him, and storms off. Joe and Dan talk at the pub and say they're pleased to be friends now, and that Joe thinks Hyper is only a good bloke now that Sally's convinced him. Dan asks Joe if he still loves Sally, and he says he does. Dan tells Joe that he needs to tell Sally he loves her. Joe gets up and leaves the pub. Andie, George and Lenny get home and find Kelly waiting. Andie invites Kelly in. Kelly gives George her solicitor's details, and tells him she reckons he's having an affair with Andie. She storms out. At the gay bar where Sally and Hyper are, Sally tells Hyper that Joe made her life miserable when he found out about her time inside, so he should not feel singled out. Hyper confides that he cannot afford his flat any more, so Sally says she will move in with him. Joe creeps back in to Blackwall and puts on a dress uniform. Pitbull sees him and teases him. At Andie's, Andie tells George she knows Kelly thinks they're having an affair. George says that's stupid because they're just mates. Andie hesitantly agrees. At the club, Hyper and Sally continue discussing her moving in when Joe arrives in his uniform. Hyper and Sally are pleased to see him, when he suddenly goes down on one knee and proposes to Sally. Sally does not know what to say.
148	16	"Episode 16"	Gareth Milne	Len Collin	9 July 2000	8.56
Sally, Pearce, Dan and George are helping the police with a shout by the Thames Barrier – on a boat. George is seasick. They rescue the captain, but he says he needs to get back in for his cashbox. Sally and Dan go in with BA on and find the cashbox. It turns out to have the ashes of his late wife in it. Recall, Sicknote, Joe and Hyper are out doing hydrant checks with Coleman. There are several prostitutes watching them. Hyper teases Joe about proposing to Sally. Coleman tells Joe that he has to transfer out of Blackwall, regardless of whether Sally accepts his proposal or not. On the way back, Recall spots his policewoman girlfriend, Vicky, with the prostitutes. He slams the brakes on and jumps out to confront her, and Vicky says she's joined the vice squad. To make it look believable, she knees Recall in the groin and runs off to join the other prostitutes. Back at Blackwall, Recall has to explain himself to Coleman. Hyper sends Joe and Sally to work up the training tower together, where Joe tells Sally he does not mind waiting for her answer. After the shift, Sally goes to Hyper's to check out the room he offered her. Sally says she is not sure she is ready for marriage, but she's made up her mind. Coleman offers Maggie a lift home. Joe and Dan go to the pub with Recall, when Vicky turns up to explain. Pearce gets home to Fiona, who tells him she is pregnant. Several pregnancy tests later, Pearce is in disbelief, but says he's glad. They tell Zoe, who's thrilled. At Andie's gym, George is play fighting with Lenny when Kelly arrives. She says she knows George having an affair with Andie. George and Andie both deny it. Kelly says it was George's fault she had an affair. Kelly calls Andie a tart and Andie marches her out of the gym, then tells George to stop making excuses for Kelly. George tells Andie he does not care about Kelly any more. Andie asks if there is any truth in Kelly's accusations. George tells her she is the biggest affair he never had, and they kiss. At a fireworks warehouse, a man locks up his unit and his cigarette rolls under the security grate, setting fire to a pile of newspaper, and that fire spreads fast. As he drives off, three teenagers break in via a skylight. At Blackwall, Pearce announces Fiona's pregnancy, and everyone congratulates him. At the warehouse, the teenagers crowbar open the boxes and see the fireworks, but the alarm starts and they try to leave when they discover the flames. Both engines and Shadbrook are called out. One youth is brought down from the roof and says his friend and sister are trapped. The fireworks start burning and exploding and flying about. Sally and Recall are preparing to go in with BA when an explosion bursts through a window. Griggs turns up, clearly on a mission to find fault with Coleman's handling. He says he will take over and starts reassigning the firefighters. Coleman says that the BA crew will be running low on air, but Griggs says it does not matter when there are people reported inside. ACO Chapman turns up. Hyper says now everyone is rescued, they need to back off and let the fire burn itself out. Griggs sees them retreating, and orders the BA crew back in, claiming the priority is the building. Coleman refuses and goes to Chapman. Exhausted, Blue Watch start to go back to the fire, and Sally tells Joe she will marry him. Elsewhere Chapman over-rules Griggs and says they can stand down. Pearce goes to tell the BA crew to stand down, but a huge explosion bursts through the warehouse door, knocking down Sally, Joe, Sicknote and Dan. Joe and Sicknote are killed instantly, and Dan and Sally lie unconscious on the ground.

=== Series 13 (2001) ===
No. overall	No. in series	Title	Directed by	Written by	Original release date	UK viewers (millions)
149	1	"Episode 1"	Claire Winyard	Jonathan Rich	21 January 2001	11.05
It is some time after the warehouse fire which killed Joe and Sicknote. Blue Watch has relocated to a newly built station. Hi Ho has joined them, along with a new guy, Adam Benjamin. They're attending to a car accident where one driver is a woman in labour. With no doctors about, Pearce will have to deliver the baby, a boy, who the mother names Pearce. George is driving the TL with Adam when they have to stop for a pedestrian who shows them to a flat on fire. George calls for back up from Shadbrook who arrive and make comments about Hyper being gay. They also tell George that Hi Ho's a virgin. Coleman arrives and says even though he's now station commander, they're still his responsibility. On the way back, George passes the old Blackwall, which is being turned into a restaurant. George laments that Sicknote would turn in his grave. In a flat, a young father complains on the phone about a neighbour playing loud music, but gets nowhere. Blue Watch get back in time for the official opening. They set to work cleaning the station. Adam tells George that if he ever wants work on the side, he can sort him out with building or plastering or electrics. Coleman asks to see Pearce, Adam and George about the burning flat. The female victim has claimed that while she was being rescued, some items were taken from her bag by George, so the police have to be involved. Coleman tells Sally that the results of the investigation are coming soon. Sally says she blames Griggs for giving the order to go back in. Back at the flats, some young men are still partying and drinking. The young father confronts them but they just laugh at him. Pearce is merrily spreading the word about George being accused of theft. Hyper offers to set Pearce's pager to vibrate instead of ring so that if Fiona calls, nobody will know. Pitbull and Sally are working on the roof garden together. Sally plants a tree to honour Joe, and Pitbull gives it pride of place. Adam is showing the boys his pheromone spray, and Hi Ho, desperate to find a girl, is interested. Adam says he can have a can free of charge. The leader of Red Watch, Sean Bateman, chats to Sally as she cleans. He says everyone misses Joe. Sally says Dan has gone travelling. Maggie gets Pearce to look over the new mess equipment, but cannot sort it out so delegates to Hi Ho. Maggie asks if she can visit Fiona, and he says she can. Maggie tells Hi Ho it is okay to save himself for marriage. Griggs arrives at Blackwall, now determined to bring George down. Hyper is on the phone to the pager company, sending a prank message to Pearce's pager. The rest of the watch look at the photographer taking pictures as the messages start to arrive, disrupting the photographer. At the party flat, someone pushes a lighted wedge of newspapers through the letterbox. The partygoers continue, oblivious. A shout comes in to the flats, and the engines zoom off. The young father gets back to his flat and takes off several layers of clothes. Meanwhile, the partygoers are screaming for help on the balcony. On the engine, Pearce's pager is buzzing constantly with messages like "The stork's coming". An elderly couple, unaware of the fire in a flat below, relax and nod off. Hyper and Recall go into the block and start evacuating it. The young father and his wife escape on to the roof with their baby. Hyper and Recall go into a flat and find five young children unattended. Meanwhile, at the Pearce's, Maggie is visiting Fiona, when Fiona goes into labour. Maggie calls an ambulance, and Fiona asks her to call Pearce's pager, but Pearce ignores the message, thinking it is Hyper's prank again. At the scene, the elderly couple's flat is filling with smoke. Blue Watch find them, and rescue them. Adam is trying to convince the young mother, who's afraid of heights, to come off the roof and onto the cherry picker. Sally shouts up that there are gas cylinders inside. Just then, a huge explosion bursts out of the flats, and Coleman realises Pearce and Recall are still inside.
150	2	"Episode 2"	Claire Winyard	Jonathan Rich	28 January 2001	11.38
Sally and Coleman try to get Pearce on the radio, but he's trapped under fallen rubble with the elderly Mr Schuster. Recall comes to and sees the young mother, Lyn, lying by the elderly couple's fireplace. Griggs will not let anyone else go inside. Pearce makes contact on the radio and shouts for Recall. Recall is balanced on a ledge where the floor has collapsed. Suddenly, the gas main catches light right beside Recall and the young mother. Griggs gives consent for them to go in. Sally finds Mrs Schuster and sends her out to the paramedics. George brings the TL in. Mr Schuster confides to Pearce that he set off a smoke flare at the party flat, and he blames himself for all the chaos, meaning the young father is exonerated. George winches Lyn out. Hyper and Sally rescue Mr Schuster and Pearce. Recall goes to see Lyn and tells her Mr Schuster confessed, so she should give her husband another chance. Pearce looks at his pager and asks who's sending the messages about the baby's arrival. Hyper confesses to the early messages, but not the later ones. Pearce realises Fiona is actually in labour and runs to the hospital. He finds Maggie and Fiona back on the ward, and meets his new baby daughter. The local councillor, Alison, introduces herself to Coleman. Back at Blackwall, Pitbull torments George about the stolen jewellery. Red Watch commander Sean catches Pitbull and punishes him by making him clean the engine. The entire watch turns out at the hospital to visit Pearce, but are denied by the receptionist. Hi Ho steps up to help Adam, and the receptionist comments on his after-shave, Adam's pheremone spray. While he keeps her busy, the others creep away. Adam and Hi Ho argue over who gets to flirt with Zoe. Adam sprays some of his pheromone spray onto Hyper, who has his back turned. On the way out, Hyper announces he's pulled a male nurse. Everyone goes to the Oliver Twist pub, which is run by Adam's mum, Elaine. Recall tells everyone he's got into investing on stocks and shares. Sally, Hi Ho and Hyper ask Recall to invest for them. George gets home to Andie, and finds out his divorce from Kelly has been granted. The next morning, Pearce takes his daughter, who he's called Eve, and shows her the sunrise over London. At Blackwall, Coleman angrily throws down the local paper. It has commented on the "friction" between Coleman and Griggs. Alison arrives to see Coleman. At the hospital, baby Eve is checked out by a doctor, who seems concerned and moves her to the special care unit. Fiona blames herself for Eve's chest infection. With the new kitchen equipment not working, Elaine brings cooked breakfast over from the Oliver Twist. The watch eat it away from Maggie so as not to hurt her feelings. A shout comes in to a flood at a video rental shop. Hi Ho is caught looking at the adult titles. Recall collects the £10 notes which have come out of the cash register. At Blackwall, Coleman asks to see Sally. He tells her the enquiry has cleared Griggs, and they should not see Griggs as a scapegoat. Sally is upset and goes up to the roof garden, where she meets Sean, who says he wants to cheer her up. A policeman turns up to talk to George about the missing jewellery. It turns out Steve Prentice and Gary Foot from Shadbrook said they saw George handling the jewellery. Adam sprays himself with pheromone spray and goes to apologise to Maggie. She comments on Adam's "very nice after shave".
151	3	"Episode 3"	Susan Tully	Len Collin	4 February 2001	10.75
The pump is on its way to an incident involving a light aircraft which has crashed at an industrial estate. Hyper rescues the passenger, Philippa while Hi Ho notices the electrics are sparking. Hi Ho chats to Philippa. At the hospital, the Pearces are told they can take Eve home. Back at the scene, Sally finds the pilot, when suddenly the plane starts exploding. Philippa is rescued and taken by the paramedics. Her pet snake escapes and crawls onto Hi Ho, who's scared of snakes. Coleman tells George that the lady whose jewellery was stolen has made a complaint about him. On the way back to Blackwall, Adam tells Hi Ho he might have a modelling job for him and Recall, for the local paper's agony aunt page. Hyper tells Coleman that Sally is still upset about Griggs being exonerated, and that they could give her the job of Crew Commander to take her mind off things. In the mess, everyone is unhappy with the burnt pies. Maggie says she still has not got the hang of the oven. Recall says the shares syndicate bought are now worth £230. They agree to buy a computer to track their shares. Alison comes to visit Coleman again and asks if he'd like to have dinner with her. Coleman asks Sally how she feels, and she says some people have let her, Joe and Sicknote down. She tells Coleman she does not imagine he will be rocking the boat now he's promoted. He reprimands her, but still offers her the job of Temporary Crew Commander, which she accepts. Back at Hyper's, she confesses that she does not think she will ever forget what happened to Joe, and cannot believe life just goes on without him. Andie laments the lack of romance with George. Coleman phones Alison and cancels their date because he feels sick, so she turns up unannounced at his houseboat. They very nearly kiss, but Coleman runs off, claiming stomach pain. At the photo shoot, Adam is trying to manipulate Hi Ho and his mother into posing as an amorous couple who are interrupted by angry "dad" Recall. At the Oliver Twist, Elaine and Recall laugh about the whole thing. The next day, Pearce is back at work, and roll call is barely finished when a shout comes in to rescue some joyriders who have managed to get stuck hanging off a cliff. Sally gets both boys to climb into the back seat to rebalance the car then brings the car to safety. Fiona rings Blackwall, and Sean answers, so Fiona put the phone down. Adam recognises one of the joyriders as his nephew, but his nephew shouts to Blue watch that they need to keep an eye on Adam, who's the shady character of the family. With more people complaining about being sick, Hyper suggests that they have got food poisoning from Maggie's cooking. The phone rings in Pearce's office, and it is Zoe. He rushes home, and Coleman says Sean Bateman from Red Watch will cover. At the Pearce's, a police car is waiting, and Zoe says she called the police when Fiona did not answer the door. Fiona is embarrassed. Sally goes to see Bateman to talk about Griggs and says she wants justice. He gets her to think about what Joe would have wanted, and she resolves to get on with things. George goes to see Adam, and says that since he's related to a family of villains, so it is far more likely he stole the jewellery. He tells Adam he'd better not have set him up.
152	4	"Episode 4"	Susan Tully	Len Collin	11 February 2001	9.99
A smartly dressed man sits on a park bench with a folder, smoking. Two men in suits get out of a car and chase him. The man dives into an embassy to lock himself into a room and the others bang on the door. The ambassador, who turns out to be his brother, asks him to come out and tells him he should not have gone to the press. At Blackwall, Coleman tells Hyper he is angry because Pearce's cover officer from Shadbrook has not arrived. George goes through the things in Adam's locker, and accuses Adam of stealing the brooch. Maggie serves up tea and cake, but nobody wants her food. Coleman says he's called environmental health to rule out food poisoning. Adam tells Recall and Hi Ho that their modelling photos will not be used in the magazine. Firefighter Gary "Flatty" Foot arrives from Shadbrook to cover for Pearce. In the embassy, the ambassador lets his men shoot the door's lock open, but the bullet lands on a paint pot and sets it alight. Blue Watch are called, but the ambassador does not allow them in and says there are confidential documents inside. After pleading, eventually he relents. Sally goes up on the platform and rescues two men, one of whom clutches a bag. He drops it as he jumps to the platform, and as it hits the ground it bursts open, and submachine guns spill out; two policemen seize the guns. The BA crew find the dead body of the ambassador's brother. Inside, Hyper spots a hand grenade, which explodes. Hyper and Adam get out quickly. The Ambassador explains his corrupt officials to Coleman, who can only stare in disbelief. At Blackwall, the Environmental Health officers arrive to inspect the kitchen. Hi Ho calls in their return to base, and falls in love with the voice at the other end of the line. Adam says he could fix them up, since he knows the girl, Donna, personally. Adam's photos of Recall and Hi Ho come in and they share them around at the pub. Recall arrives and says the games console at the station has been stolen, and they wonder if it has been stolen by Flatty. At the Pearce house, Zoe announces she's found her own flat and is moving out. At Hyper's, Sally and Hyper are teaching George to make lasagne for Andie. Sally does a taste test, and spits George's out – he put vinegar in it instead of wine. Recall, Adam and Hi Ho arrive at Shadbrook to try to get their games console back, but are caught. The next morning, Capital FM report on the brave heroics of "Watch Commander Sharpe", and Pearce grumbles that Watch Commander is his job, not Hyper's, and goes back to work. Coleman tells everyone off for the invasion of Shadbrook. Pearce warns Hyper that now the press know his name, they will try to knock him down. In the gym, George and Sally are working out. George shows Sally a necklace he's bought for Andie with his winnings from the horses. Coleman gives Pearce the task of telling Maggie about the findings of the Environmental Health report. He also tells Pearce that Flatty did take the games console, and Shadbrook's commander returned it to him. Maggie does not take kindly to being told about the report and walks off. Adam consoles her. Pearce tells Hyper that he's to deal with the new crew commander, Melissa Clarke. A woman turns up, and Hyper shows her around, unaware that it is Donna, and not the new crew commander. Meanwhile, the new crew commander turns up, and Sally assumes she is Donna. The penny drops when Hi Ho sees Sally with the confused looking Melissa, who finally gets to introduce herself.
153	5	"Episode 5"	Susan Tully	Jeff Dodds	18 February 2001	10.54
In the gym, Melissa and Hi Ho are having an endurance competition. Melissa beats Hi Ho. A shout comes in for the pump ladder; a man has tried to set himself on fire. The "man on fire" turns out to be a stripper who wears a Viking helmet, rehearsing for his routine. Hyper tells Sally that Melissa knows a lot about the watch already, and he's suspicious of her. Griggs arrives and Melissa greets him warmly. Griggs tells George that he's transferring him to staff duties while the investigation goes on. Everyone goes to the Oliver Twist, except Coleman, who announces that he's off ballroom dancing, with Alison. Melissa "accidentally" hits Adam between the legs with a snooker cue. Elaine tells Adam that she thinks she is the source of the food poisoning because the batch of food she brought in to help Maggie made her customers sick too. At Blackwall, Sean asks Sally to help him start his car. Pearce gets home to chaos and a crying baby. He tells Fiona they're going out for dinner. At the ballroom, Maggie turns up and gatecrashes Coleman's dance while Alison looks on. Alison tries to make a move on Coleman, but he's uncertain. Fiona cannot concentrate on dinner, and asks to go home. She goes to the toilets and tries not to cry. George cooks fish for Andie, who is impressed. He gives her the necklace, but she senses something is wrong, so he tells her about the transfer. The next day, Maggie boasts to everyone about her evening with Coleman. Pearce tells Hyper that Melissa will take roll call, and Hyper reluctantly agrees. He watches Melissa gush gratefully at Pearce. George loses his cool and angrily tells them about his transfer. A shout comes in for the pump ladder during roll call. When they arrive, it turns out to be a capsized fire engine from Shadbrook which has crashed into scaffolding. Flatty is trapped inside. George rescues him, and Flatty confesses that it was him who stole the brooch. George is exonerated. Alison turns up at Blackwall as everyone goes out for a drink. Maggie watches Elaine chucking out a load of food. Maggie realises Elaine was the source of the poisoning and confronts her. She says she will not let on, as long as Elaine tells Coleman it was not Maggie's food which caused the poisoning. Maggie says she knows Sally has a crush on Sean, but Sally denies it. Hi Ho meets up with Kate, the mysterious voice on the radio. Adam tries to flirt with Kate, but she only has eyes for Hi Ho. George apologises to Adam, and Andie turns up. Recall tells Adam that their shares have crashed and everyone's lost their money. At Blackwall, Hyper is doing paperwork when he comes across Melissa's folder, which contains official notes on the personalities of every member of Blue Watch. He says she must be doing it for Pearce. He throws the folder back at her and walks out.
154	6	"Episode 6"	Susan Tully	Doug Briggs	25 February 2001	9.52
Hyper tells Sally about Melissa's folder of character reports. Sally is dismissive. Pearce tells Hyper to leave Melissa alone. A shout comes in for a person trapped, and the ladder goes out. It turns out to be a cat called Mr Tomkins, trapped under floorboards. Hyper tells Melissa that he's going to tell Coleman about her folder, but Coleman's not interested. After the shift, Maggie visits Fiona, and tells Pearce she is worried Fiona's not coping. Alison takes Coleman ten pin bowling, but he panics and runs out on her. The next morning, Griggs arrives, and Melissa confesses that Hyper found her file. Griggs denies ever asking Melissa to write a file. Melissa confesses to Sally that Griggs asked her to report on them, and Sally is disappointed. Melissa says she wants to make it up to Hyper. A schoolchild goes into a basement of a museum on a school trip, and Blue watch go in after him. Adam and Hyper find him. Just as they bring him up, the sluice gates open, and Pearce is hit by water and washed away. Adam gets Hyper, George, Recall and Hi Ho to help him out on a "waitressing" job – dressing up as school boys for a school days themed party for a group of middle aged women, and Hi Ho's new girlfriend is with them. Sally, Sean and Melissa go to the pub. Sean flirts with Sally before he goes to get more drinks, and Melissa encourages her to make a go of it. Sean asks Sally if she wants to go on to a club, but Sally declines and goes home. Melissa goes to see Griggs and tells him he does not need to keep an eye on Blue Watch. Coleman tells Alison that he ran off because he went bowling with his wife, and on their last day together, he'd killed her drink driving, but only found out from the post mortem that she was pregnant. Sally answers the flat door to Sean, who says he has to give her some money she left. She invites him in and Sean asks for a cup of tea. Suddenly he pins her against a cabinet. At the waitressing evening, Adam pays Recall plenty more than the others to help him repay the others for losing money on the stock market.
155	7	"Episode 7"	Jamie Annett	Danny McCahon	4 March 2001	10.43
It is the morning, and Sally is upset. She rings Hyper, who's staying at Adam's, but Adam picks it up and hangs it up. At the Pearces', Fiona is fretting about being a good mother while Geoff merrily heads to work. At Blackwall, Pearce asks if anyone's seen Sally. A group of young boys come to visit Blackwall. One young boy, Tommy, knows loads about the brigade, which Pearce likes at first but soon finds irritating. Sally is at home, ignoring her telephone. Ralph, a pensioner from the community centre, comes to visit Coleman, and Maggie welcomes him in. At a demonstration on how to put out a chip fire, Tommy is scared and Pearce takes him to his office. Tommy confesses to starting a fire by putting a lighted candle under a bed to surprise his mother on his birthday. Fiona rings the station and Coleman answers. Coleman picks up on Fiona being exhausted, but Pearce says he's not having problems, and neither is Fiona. He phones Fiona and tells her to stop calling work. Sally arrives at work, still upset. She tells Pearce she had a doctor's appointment. Pearce lets Tommy use a fire extinguisher and gives him a toy fire engine before he goes home. Maggie lends Ralph some money and he leaves. Maggie congratulates Sally on her relationship with "lovely" Sean, but Sally says Maggie should not believe what she hears. Fiona arrives at the station with the pram and says she is not cut out to be a mum and needs help. She runs off, leaving Pearce with the baby. In the mess, Maggie tells the others off for speculating about Pearce's family. A shout comes in for the pump ladder to help the police, who think a girl is trapped in a boarded up house. Adam and Sally climb in through a hole in the roof, when Adam hears cries for help. He finds a young woman, Carol, with her foot trapped in some broken floorboards. As Adam and Melissa work to free Carol, she stops breathing and Sally gives her mouth to mouth. Sally confronts Carol's boyfriend, accusing him of leaving her. Pearce hears the confrontation, and reprimands Sally back at Blackwall. Sally breaks down before Pearce can finish, and tells Pearce that Sean Bateman raped her. Pearce takes her to Coleman, and then tells the others that Bateman raped her. Nobody says a word. The others ask Melissa what Bateman was like at the pub, but she storms out. Coleman calls Griggs, who says she has to go to the police. Bateman turns up at work, and all the guys hold themselves back. Coleman and Griggs have a meeting with Bateman and tell him he's been accused of rape. Bateman says it was all consensual, and Sally had given him signals. He says Melissa would back him up. Griggs says he's transferring Bateman away while the investigation happens. The rest of Blue Watch confront Bateman, who says he's innocent. Hyper says he will not get away with it. Pearce gets home with Eve, but Fiona has gone. At Hyper's, Sally says she cannot go back into the flat, and that she does not think the police believe her.
156	8	"Episode 8"	Jamie Annett	Colin Steven	11 March 2001	9.79
Bateman and Pitbull meet up in the street. Pitbull sides with Bateman. At Blackwall, Recall says Ben is being sent to live with him because Laura cannot cope with him. Pitbull and his friend see Melissa and have a go at her. In a bubble wrap factory, a fire starts in front of a radio. Hi Ho confides to Maggie that he and Kate do not get much time together as they both live at home, so Adam offers to do a nice meal for them at his place. Blue watch are called to the factory fire to assist Shadbrook. George has a fall, breaks his arm and goes to hospital. Pearce says ACO Chapman is coming to visit. They all complain about Pearce's bad mood being due to Fiona going, and he overhears. He says Fiona will be back in a few days. Chapman tells Coleman not to get too close to Alison, because she is trying to put forward a plan for a new supermarket. Coleman speaks to Sally about the support she is getting. Ralph comes to visit Maggie. He repays her £5 and brings a bunch of flowers. Maggie invites him to stay for tea. Pearce calls Zoe and tries to speak to Fiona, but has no luck. Coleman overhears, and Pearce confesses. Ralph sees an antique firefighter's helmet and asks to borrow it. Maggie lets him. Sally tells Coleman the police are dropping the case against Bateman. Hi Ho and Kate go for dinner at Adam's flat above the Oliver Twist, where she tells Hi Ho she is a virgin. His silence makes her realise he is too. Recall welcomes Ben back. Fiona comes home and tells Pearce she needed some time. They awkwardly reconcile. Coleman catches Pitbull and his friend picking on Melissa and sends them packing. Sally tells George the police have dropped the case and Bateman will get away with everything. Hi Ho catches Adam and Recall putting a bet on him sleeping with Kate before the evening is over. Coleman tells Alison it is over, and she accuses him of putting his job first. Bateman sees Melissa at the pub and offers to buy her a drink to thank her for getting him off the rape charge. Elaine says she will not serve him and throws him out. The next morning, hungover Recall comes down to breakfast cooked by Ben. Maggie goes to collect the helmet from Ralph's address, but a woman opens the door and says Ralph does not live there. Maggie goes back to the photo archives and looks at the names of the firefighters. She singles out one man who catches her eye and goes to Coleman. George comes to visit Blackwall, but suddenly collapses. Recall calls an ambulance. Andie rushes to hospital, but finds Kelly at George's bedside. George is diagnosed with a haematoma, bleeding on the brain. Sally gets silent phone calls – the scene cuts to Bateman on his mobile across the road. She tells Pearce about the phone calls. Coleman takes Maggie to an antique shop – a man trying to sell an antique firefighter's helmet is in the shop and the owner tipped him off. It is Ralph, and they catch him. Coleman says he cannot press charges, or Griggs will be involved and Maggie will be in trouble. At the Oliver Twist, Recall and Ben play darts. Kate arrives and she and Hi Ho imply in loud voices that they would slept together. Adam and Recall are surprised. Bateman follows Sally home and confronts her in the park. Sally tells Melissa that she needs him to show his true colours. At the Pearces' house, Pearce admits they need help and suggests counselling for postnatal depression. Andie and Kelly stay beside George's bed in hospital, arguing over whether Kelly should be there. George wakes up and says he cannot feel his left arm.
157	9	"Episode 9"	Tim Leandro	Jonathan Guy Lewis	18 March 2001	10.47
The engines are driving across a park to get to a reservoir where a boat is apparently sinking. When they arrive, there is no sign of a boat. It turns out to be a child's remote control boat which they rescue with the ladder. At Blackwall, Coleman tells Maggie it is over with Alison. Sally tells Melissa that Sean has stopped bothering her. Adam volunteers to take the boat back to Blackwall and fix it. When he takes the woman's contact details, she confesses to being the wife of Steve Prentice, the sub from Shadbrook. The watch are excited about the quiz night the next day. Hi Ho knocks Maggie off her stepladder and her ankle is hurt. It is coming to the end of Melissa's temporary posting, and Sally asks Recall if he's organised anything. Sally is changing clothes when Bateman shows up. He traps her in there. Coleman and Pitbull hear Sally shouting for help, and burst in as Bateman is shouting to Sally about what he did. Pitbull wrestles Bateman off Sally, and Sally punches Bateman. Coleman tells Bateman to get out. Ben takes a job at the Oliver Twist. Prentice shows up and says thanks to Adam for fixing the boat. He also warns Adam off his wife. It is the quiz night, but only Hyper has shown up. He summons Recall. Hi Ho goes to help Andie run the gym so she can be with George. Coleman goes to the quiz night and tells them Bateman is being charged with Sally's rape. Elaine asks Adam if he'd like to be listed as a joint licensee of the Oliver Twist. Adam accepts. Ben accuses Recall of fancying Elaine, and Recall admits he finds her attractive. The pub quiz results are in, and it is a tie so it goes to tie-breaker. Ben's team win. The next morning, Pitbull apologises to Sally for siding with Sean. Coleman says Sean is being kept in custody till the trial, and now Pitbull and Coleman have given statements, he will probably go to jail. Maggie is back at work with her ankle strapped up. A gang of builders cram into a van – one called Dermot in the rear with the ladders and supplies. Pearce asks Maggie if she will do the food for Eve's christening. She goes home to prepare. Hi Ho and Adam go out in the pump ladder to get groceries. On the way back, waiting at traffic lights and bantering with some army officers, they come across an accident. The van full of builders is involved. Inside the van, Dermot uses a mobile to ring for help but Kate cannot hear him due to poor reception. She tries to radio Blackwall, but they're away from their radio. Just then, one of the cars explodes.
158	10	"Episode 10"	Tim Leandro	Jeff Dodds	25 March 2001	10.31
Coleman radios desperately for Pearce, who's trapped in the tunnel. All the crew is safe inside the tunnel. Coleman radios to Pearce that someone is inside a van, so Pearce bangs on a van's door. Dermott bangs back gently. Everyone works together to release Dermott. The ventilation system in the tunnel stops, so time becomes limited. Another car explodes, so Coleman orders the crew to withdraw. Outside the tunnel, the tanker driver confesses that his load was incorrectly labelled – it was not a tanker full of milk, it was a tanker full of diesel. They go back in to the tunnel Recall finds an isolator switch to turn the leaking fuel off. Back at Blackwall, Pearce congratulates them all on a good job. They start a poll on who will be chosen as Eve's godparents. Recall says Maggie. Hyper says Coleman or Griggs. They prepare for Melissa's surprise goodbye party. Melissa tells everyone that she's got a job at Shadbrook, and everyone congratulates her. She asks if they would like to go to the pub, but everyone except Sally makes an excuse, leaving Melissa disappointed. Hi Ho and Pitbull have a cookery competition to decide who gets to offer to do the catering for Eve's christening. Pearce goes to see Coleman and asks him to be Eve's godfather. Coleman is stunned, and accepts. Melissa is upset that nobody will come for a drink, but then Pitbull tells her about her surprise party at the Oliver Twist. Ben asks Recall if he's going to ask Elaine out. Ben and Hi Ho go to Andie's gym to supervise a children's boxing club. Ben loses control and the kids fight. Their angry mothers tell Hi Ho that Andie will hear about it. At the pub, everyone plays giant Jenga and Twister. Recall asks Elaine out and she accepts. The next day, he worries about where to take her. The watch reckon that with Melissa gone, Pearce will miss having someone to mentor, so to punish Hi Ho for the boxing club mistake, they send him to volunteer as Pearce's new protegee. Adam asks Pearce who the godparents are, and he says Maggie, Coleman and Zoe. The cooking competition starts – Pitbull cooks horsemeat. Just then, a shout comes in for a fire at a warehouse and the pump ladder goes out. The warehouse has bottles of paraffin and rags inside. Adam recognises the casualty as his cousin, Frank. Frank is fine, but Sally comments on how strange it was that Shadbrook were called to the same warehouse that morning. Recall tells Adam he should have told Pearce that Frank was his cousin, but Adam refuses.
159	11	"Episode 11"	Rob Evans	Tom Higgins	1 April 2001	9.34
Just as Pearce starts telling people what to wear to Eve's christening, a shout comes in and the pump ladder goes out. A girl is unresponsive in a bathroom. Hi Ho breaks in through the window and finds a girl in Irish dancing costume. She's deliberately locked herself in to avoid going to a competition. At Blackwall, Pearce is pestering Maggie about the food. Coleman asks Adam and Recall if they would go to the police station and identify the man at the scene, but Adam and Recall are cagey. They agree to go together after work. Griggs turns up and asks for Hyper because he wants to write a report about gay firefighters. Hyper declines. Pearce invites Griggs to the christening. Coleman realises he has not got Eve a christening present, so Maggie says he can go halves on hers. A shout comes in for the pump ladder at the church booked for Eve's christening. The entire interior has burned down, leaving a hole in the roof. At the end of the shift, Adam's grandfather tells him that Frank did the arson to help payback a loan from a local loan shark. Adam does not know what to do and asks Recall to give him an extra day to think about what he will tell the police. George appears at the Oliver Twist and is welcomed back. He tells Sally he's going to propose to Andie. At the Pearce house, Pearce tells Fiona about the church, and she is fuming. Maggie finds them an alternative. Recall's date with Elaine goes badly when he is turfed out of the posh restaurant he'd booked for not wearing a tie. They end up having fish and chips outside in the rain. Later, Adam walks in on them kissing on the sofa. Elaine hears them arguing and takes them both to the police station, where Adam gives his statement, incriminating his cousin. At George's, Andie rifles through George's pockets and finds the ring. It is the morning of the christening, and Maggie arrives at the Pearce house, followed by Kelly. Adam goes into his mum's room and finds her in bed with Recall. Maggie takes Zoe to the new venue she's found. On the outside it is beautiful, but inside is set up for a sci-fi convention with terrifying costumes. Luckily, everyone laughs. George and Andie, who have not officially been invited to the christening, prepare to turn up, unaware that Kelly is going. The sci-fi costumes and equipment are a big hit with the guests. Hyper tells Coleman he's changed his mind about writing the article about being a gay firefighter. Maggie gives Fiona a christening present, which is now engraved with "With love from Maggie and John Coleman". Coleman is embarrassed. Adam leaves the christening party suddenly. Chris, the old watch commander, arrives. Nobody is pleased to see him. The ceremony begins, and the vicar uses a firefighter's helmet as a font. George and Andie arrive, and George sees Chris. Angry looks are exchanged. Adam turns up at hospital and finds his cousin, Frank, with his grandfather. Frank has been badly beaten as a result of Adam going to the police. George speaks to Kelly and accuses her of still being with Chris. Andie tells George to calm down. George punches Chris and Chris lands in the buffet food. George runs off and Andie runs after him. She reminds him he's not married to Kelly any more, and suggests George asks her to marry him, but George cannot. Andie runs off.
160	12	"Episode 12"	Richard Holthouse	Joe Turner	22 April 2001	8.52
Adam finds Recall has spent the night at his house with his mother again. George goes to the gym and finds Andie beating a punch bag. He apologises for his behaviour at the christening, but Andie tells him to go away. He offers her the engagement ring, but she says no, claiming to be offended that he still thinks of Kelly as his wife. Pearce leaves Fiona, Eve and a slightly unwell looking Bruno to make his way to work, where he continues mentoring Hi Ho for his test. Sally is nervous about her assessment. Andie goes to see Fiona to apologise, and Fiona invites her in. They chat, and Fiona notices that Bruno has died. George goes back to work. Recall tells Sally the truth about George and Andie. Adam notices police pulling up outside the Oliver Twist and runs over. The place has been trashed by masked raiders. Adam takes her to Blackwall, where Recall suggests their dodgy family members were behind it. Sally goes to give Pearce something, but he's not there. She notices an envelope marked "Test questions". She leaves, and confesses her temptation to Hyper. He calms her down, and tells her he fancies Adam. A shout comes in for a fire at a block of flats. A lady called Rachel is trapped and Hi Ho keeps her calm, until she suddenly bursts out of the room into the burning hallway. Hi Ho becomes frantic. They pull her out alive. Chris and his Fire Investigation Unit turn up. George and Chris exchange glares. Recall tells Adam that he should get Frank to confess and it would sort everything out. Hi Ho and Sally go for their test and both pass. Pitbull and Pearce discuss Bruno, and Pearce apologises to George for picking on him. At the Oliver Twist, things are back to normal. Recall brings flowers for Elaine as an apology. Adam accuses Hyper of fancying him, but they laugh about it. Sally tells George to go back to Andie. At Chris's flat, the doorbell rings. It is Kelly, who says she wants to try again, but Chris sends her away. At Andie's, George and Andie eat dinner in silence. She agrees to give George another chance. Pearce and Fiona bury Bruno. Adam and Hi Ho go to the hospital. Adam goes to see Frank, and Hi Ho goes to see Rachel. Frank tells security that Adam beat him up, and gets thrown out. Hi Ho finds out that Rachel has died.
161	13	"Episode 13"	Tina Mitchell	Colin Steven	29 April 2001	8.42
George is sitting in front of the TV. Andie accuses him of making no effort. Adam tells Elaine about Frank's accusations. Kelly turns up at Andie's and talks to George. She sees he's been sleeping on the sofa. She invites him round to see the kids after work. Coleman gives Adam and recall the drafts of the firefighters' magazine, and suggest they play a trick on Hyper to stop him getting too big headed about his article. In a flat, a teenager, Anna, accidentally drops a pile of clothing onto the stove. Suddenly, it catches fire. Chris turns up at Blackwall, needing to talk about the flat fire where Rachel died. Coleman drives past, just in time and calls Blue Watch out. He climbs up the ladder and rescues Anna and the baby. Anna tells George that she's 15, and the baby is her sister. Hyper gets a call from an admirer, who's really Recall putting on an accent. Hyper plays along, but soon lets on that he knew the whole time. Andie turns up to see Andie, and Pitbull lets on that Kelly took him to work. Andie angrily confronts him and walks off. He gets back to her flat to find she's packed all his stuff. He tries to explain, but she says it is over. George goes to Kelly's and sees the kids. They end up in bed together. Elaine offers to tell the police that Adam was with her when Frank was attacked. Sally, Hi Ho and Hyper go to see Luke, Lisa's brother. They ask him how the fire started, and he tells them his sister liked to burn candles. Hi Ho apologises for not being able to save Lisa, and Luke rages at him. Chris shows up at Andie's, and she tells him she and Lenny are going away. Chris tells her that George is not going back to Kelly. Chris then goes to Kelly's, just as George is leaving. He tells George that he and Kelly want to go away together, and George tells Chris he's welcome to Kelly. Chris tells Kelly it is over. Adam goes to the police but does not involve Elaine. George confides in Coleman, who gives him a day off to sort things. Hi Ho comes to work and cries. Chris arrives at Blackwall to say he's moving away. Sally sets up a demonstration with the same candles as Luke mentioned, and one goes up in flames. George collects his kids from school. Pearce talks to Hi Ho about his reaction. Chris finds George and the kids and talks him round. He tells George it is over with Kelly. George tells Kelly it is over too. Chris takes him to Andie's. Blue Watch buy a replacement dog for Pearce, and call her Blue. George finds Andie at the coach station, and runs on to the coach, and but she says he's not done enough. He sits down on the coach and keeps trying to convince her. She relents and they get off the coach. Chris watches on as they make up.
162	14	"Episode 14"	Nigel Douglas	Colin Steven	6 May 2001	7.06
On a building site, a skip is on fire. Some teenagers are throwing more rubbish into the skip. Hi Ho spots something moving in the skip – he thinks it is a person, but it turns out to be a mannequin. He's embarrassed. The new Red Watch commander, Simon Dexter, introduces himself. Sally continues her campaign about the candles and oil burners. Coleman tells Hi Ho he's been asked to appear at the inquest into Lisa and Luke's deaths. It turns out that Dexter and Coleman are old friends. George enters a radio competition and wins a pair of West Ham season tickets and a trip to Italy. Adam is arrested for GBH at the Oliver Twist. He is questioned, and the police imply that he was responsible for the arson attacks. At a youth club, a group of Girl Guides set up for a jumble sale, when a petrol filled bottle is thrown through a window by some youths who'd been told off by the Guide leader. Blue Watch's pump ladder are called. The youths watch and laugh. Hi Ho walks up to them, and while he has his back turned, one of the boys steals the fire engine. He knocks a motorcyclist down. The boy bumps his head, and gets taken to hospital. Hi Ho cannot believe it, and Pearce tells Hi Ho if he'd not left the fire engine unattended, it would not have happened. Hi Ho tells Coleman and Pearce that he quits. Pearce walks in on Recall and George entering Eve into a Beautiful Baby competition, and is not happy. Pearce takes Hi Ho to Highgate cemetery, where he looks at the graves of Joe, Sicknote and Hallam. Elaine tells her father that he needs to get the charges against Adam dropped, or she will go to the police and tell them every single dodgy thing his family have done. At the police station, Adam is suddenly released. The inquiry into the flat fire begins. The evidence from Sally's experiment is not accepted, but Hi Ho, confidence renewed, turns up and gives evidence against the candle makers, and they're found guilty. Pearce decides to enter Eve in the Beautiful Baby competition after goading from Dexter. Ben tells Recall he's joined the Fire Brigade.
163	15	"Episode 15"	Nigel Douglas	Danny McCahon	13 May 2001	7.44
Adam rifles through some drawers and finds Elaine's address book. She tells him she knows he's trying to contact Martin, but he should just drop it and get on with his life. Hyper goes to see Luke, and finds out that they are organising a charity go-kart race to raise funds for Luke. Pearce finds out that Eve has got through to the finals of the Beautiful Baby competition, pitted against one other baby. They wonder if it is Dexter's son. Adam tells Hyper that he thinks his mother has made a deal with Martin and worries what might happen to her. Hyper announces the go-kart competition, and everyone is excited. At a warehouse, a new starter, Barry, is told to put some food into a walk-in freezer, but gets locked in by another workman's carelessness. Blue Watch are called to rescue him. They cannot find Barry, and put it down to a wind-up. Inside, Barry is losing consciousness. Suddenly, the manager realises it is Barry stuck inside. They force the freezer open and rescue him. The press get wind that both finalists in the Beautiful Baby contest have fathers at Blackwall, and send a photographer. Pitbull sneaks off to the bulletin board and switches the phone numbers to vote for Eve and Dexter's son, Jack. He also draws all over Eve's photo. Andie turns up at Blackwall and tells George that the rates have gone up, and she cannot afford to keep the gym running. Her solution is to move away and start a gym somewhere cheaper. Coleman discusses tactics for winning the go-kart competition. Hyper lets Luke move in with him, and goes to get food. Luke invites his friends round, to Hyper's disappointment. Ben overhears Recall telling Elaine that Ben's made a mistake joining the brigade, and storms off. It is the morning of the go-kart race, and Luke apologises to Hyper about his friends. George starts telling people he will have to leave because he and Andie are planning to move away. Pearce finds out that Dexter has won the Beautiful Baby competition. Hi Ho takes a shine to one of the nurses on the other go-kart team and argues with one of the guys on her team who also fancies her. Maggie, Derek and Elaine turn up, and Derek stands in for Recall, who goes to deal with Ben. Adam takes on Hi Ho's love rival, and angrily forces him into the wall. George comes in first, but Adam and his rival continue trying to bump each other into the wall. Eventually, Adam's car hits a wall and crashes. Petrol is split about, and Adam is unconscious. Everyone rushes to rescue Adam, who has a sprained ankle. Luke tells Hyper that the accident caused flashbacks. Hi Ho has a go at the rival, and he gets a kiss on the cheek from the nurse. Recall tells Ben that he is proud that he is joining the brigade. George asks the radio station to exchange the holiday tickets and season tickets for cash, and gives the cash to Andie, who is thankful that it gives her the means to pay the rates on her gym. In return, she tells him he could be a partner in the gym. Pearce realises that someone switched the numbers on the voting hotlines for Beautiful Baby. Dexter angrily comes in and says his son's been disqualified because the paper discovered a multi-voting scheme. He blames Blue Watch, but when they put their heads together, they realise that it was Pitbull. They punish him by getting him to buy a year's supply of nappies for both babies. Elaine reveals to Adam that she is his birth mother.
164	16	"Episode 16"	Richard Holthouse	Jeff Dodds	20 May 2001	8.24
In the series finale Adam and Elaine manage to reconcile, and Adam learns why Elaine left him with her parents when he was 5 months old, their reconciliation makes Recall question his relationship with Elaine. Hyper's relationship with Luke proves problematic, with Hyper wondering if they are the right fit - Sally encourages him to try again and allow his feelings rather than suppress them. Hi-Ho goes on a date. Geoff and Fiona's new dog unexpectedly gives birth and finally gives Geoff the opportunity to prank Hi-Ho. Derek, Maggie's husband suffers a heart attack and John Coleman offers to take her to the hospital to be with him. At the hospital several fires break out, causing the major Shout of the season. Maggie and Coleman get stuck in a lift, oblivious to the fires whilst Blue Watch are joined by other crews in evacuating the hospital. It soon becomes apparent that the fires are arson, rather that accident or electrical fault. Maggie and Coleman exit the lift, only for a ceiling to collapse and temporarily trap Coleman. Adam and Recall find and confront the arsonist who throws himself out of an upper floor window, leaving Recall dangling outside until he's saved by Adam. Adam and Recall resolve their friction and Blue Watch watch on.

=== Series 14 (2002) ===
No. overall	No. in series	Title	Directed by	Written by	Original release date	UK viewers (millions)
165	1	"Episode 1"	Sven Arnstein	Ed McCardie	7 July 2002	8.47
Series 14 opens with new style credits, showing the cast. It has been some time since the hospital fire. New firefighter Frank Mooney and Station Officer Mick Callaghan are awarded medals by the brigade after saving a young couple trapped in a car. During a race between members of Blue Watch up the training tower, Pearce tells Mick that Sally was raped last year. Recall falls to the floor, out of breath. Sally is concerned about Recall's health, but Mick is dismissive. Frank tells Sally that he knows Recall's health is failing, but that Mick is ignoring the obvious. Recall spots a model fire engine made entirely out of matchsticks in Pearce's car, and Pearce confesses he was making it for Recall's leaving present. Mick tells Recall everyone is concerned about him, but Recall says he's fine. Adam proposes to his girlfriend, Maddie, but she turns him down. The next morning is Recall's last day. He has a bit of a headache, but goes to find Mick to ask if he can withdraw his retirement request. Elaine shows up at Blackwall, and tells Recall she does not mind if he's a fireman or working in a pub with her. A shout comes in to a burning house and everyone heads off. Recall thinks he sees a child at an upstairs window and heads off without BA. Mick cannot get him to come back. He grabs a baby from the house, but does not notice gas cylinders in the room. They explode, but Recall is sure there is another child, so a BA crew go in and save her. Adam notices Recall has collapsed and they realise he's having a heart attack. Everyone tries to revive him, but he dies. Back at Blackwall, Adam cries, Pearce smashes his matchstick fire engine and everyone else sits in silence. Mick calls Elaine and asks everyone else to put their equipment away. Pearce crushes the remains of the model engine.
166	2	"Episode 2"	Colin Teague	Mark Burt	14 July 2002	6.69
Sally blames Mick for not paying more attention to her warning about Recall's deteriorating health. Adam tells Frank that they cannot afford the repairs to the Oliver Twist's roof, but Frank assures him that he can get the money. DO Ross arrives to investigate Recall's death. Ben quits the brigade and wants George to write Recall's eulogy. Hundreds of firefighters line the street on the way to the cemetery. Sally, Pearce, Charlie, Adam, Frank and Mick are pallbearers; Ben carries Recall's yellow helmet. George gives an emotional eulogy, and they lower Recall's coffin into the ground.
167	3	"Episode 3"	Martin Hutchings	Ed McCardie	21 July 2002	6.78
Adam tells the boys that he has a part-time job driving a stripper around, but Frank asks him to be more discreet. Lisa, the Watch's new cook, reveals that she works on phone sex lines to earn extra money. Sally moves out. Later, when sally was the only one awake, Sally goes to the roof garden. Frank follows her and she confides that she feels she is unlucky with men. Frank tells her that it is better not to get involved and to stay alone. Sally kisses him and they end up sleeping together on the roof, but get spotted by Lisa. Blue Watch battles a small fire.
168	4	"Episode 4"	Martin Hutchings	Ed McCardie	28 July 2002	5.95
Mick tells Sally that he knows she is homeless and needs to find a place. Blue Watch battles a fire in a burning building; it is Craig's first fire, he panics when he sees a burnt body. That night when driving home, he has flashbacks to the body and crashes; Craig is subsequently hospitalized. Frank distances himself from Adam and the rest of the crew.
169	5	"Episode 5"	Colin Teague	Tim Hyndman	4 August 2002	4.98
Shauna dances around her bedroom and dresses up. She tells a photo of Mick that everything would be okay if he came home. Frank stops a mugger from stealing an elderly lady's bag. The investigation by DO Ross into Recall's death continues. Mick confesses to Adam that he knew Recall was unfit for duty and that he should have stopped him; Adam tells Sally. Sally encourages Mick to not confess to DO Ross, but later confesses herself. Shauna is hospitalized after accidentally causing an electrical explosion and it is revealed by doctors that she may suffer from bipolar disorder. At Recall's inquiry, Mick is quizzed about why Sally's warnings were ignored. Mick says it is all his fault. DO Ross says Mick is a fine officer and will probably be cleared of any guilt. Mick goes back to Blackwall and tells them they're in the clear. He offers to buy Adam a drink, then goes back to his family. He apologises to Sally. Frank offers Mick help if he needs it, and gives him a present to give Shauna. At the hospital, a doctor tells Mick that he thinks Shauna has bipolar disorder. Mick gives Shauna Frank's present, and she says she never wants to see Frank again.
170	6	"Episode 6"	Richard Holthouse	Joe Fraser	11 August 2002	5.48
Adam is drugged by an attractive girl in the pub and robbed of his valuables. Steven discovered a beached whale and Blue Watch try to pull the whale back into the sea. Their efforts are unsuccessful and the whale dies, which upsets Steven. After Frank has a fight with Mick and they apologize, Sally tells Frank that she misjudged him; Sally and Frank sleep together.
171	7	"Episode 7"	Sven Arnstein	Ed McCardie	18 August 2002	5.14
Frank wants to participate in a Fightfighters vs Police boxing match to win over Sally. Sally and Frank talk on the roof garden, and Frank asks Sally to move in with him; Sally expresses how her past relationship with Joe has made her wary of dating firefighters. Sally later decides that she does want a relationship with Frank. Blue Watch deals with an influx of hoax calls overnight. George and Andie become engaged.
172	8	"Episode 8"	Tina Mitchell	Ed McCardie	25 August 2002	5.79
Part 1 A stray Russian satellite loaded with plutonium breaks its orbit and falls down into London. Sally and Shauna become pregnant, but Sally decides to have an abortion. Blue Watch battles a petrol fire and explosion in a block of flats. Part 2 Pearce runs the London Marathon. George and Andie get married and Sally has the abortion. Frank is trapped by debris following a gas explosion while trying to rescue partyers at an illegal rave. Mick stops Sally from running in to get him, sending Pearce and Adam in instead. The radio news announces that the satellite is not only going to avoid England, but that the plutonium had burned up in the atmosphere. The crew arrive back at Blackwall and everyone rushes out to see the burning plutonium rain down like fireworks. Sally looks at Frank and smiles.
