= Brig =

Sailing vessel with two square-rigged masts

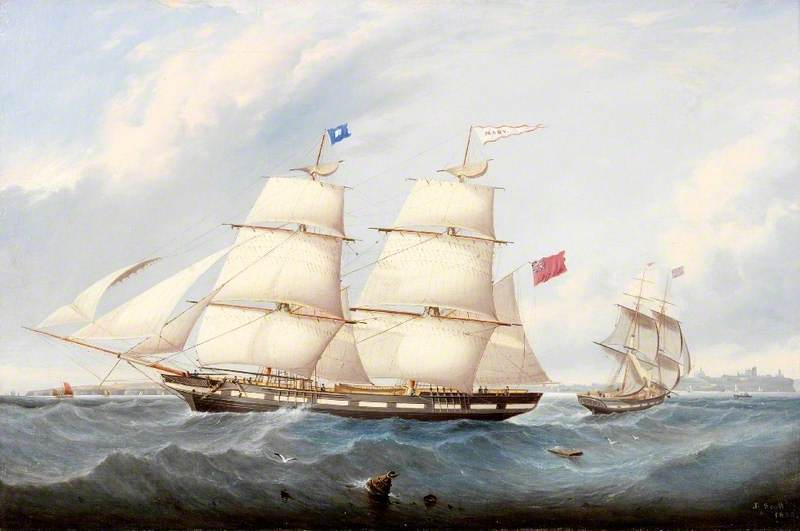
The South Shields collier brig Mary, painted by John Scott in 1855, showing two views of the same vessel. A Bentinck boom is fitted to the foot of the fore-course as a labour saving device when tacking.

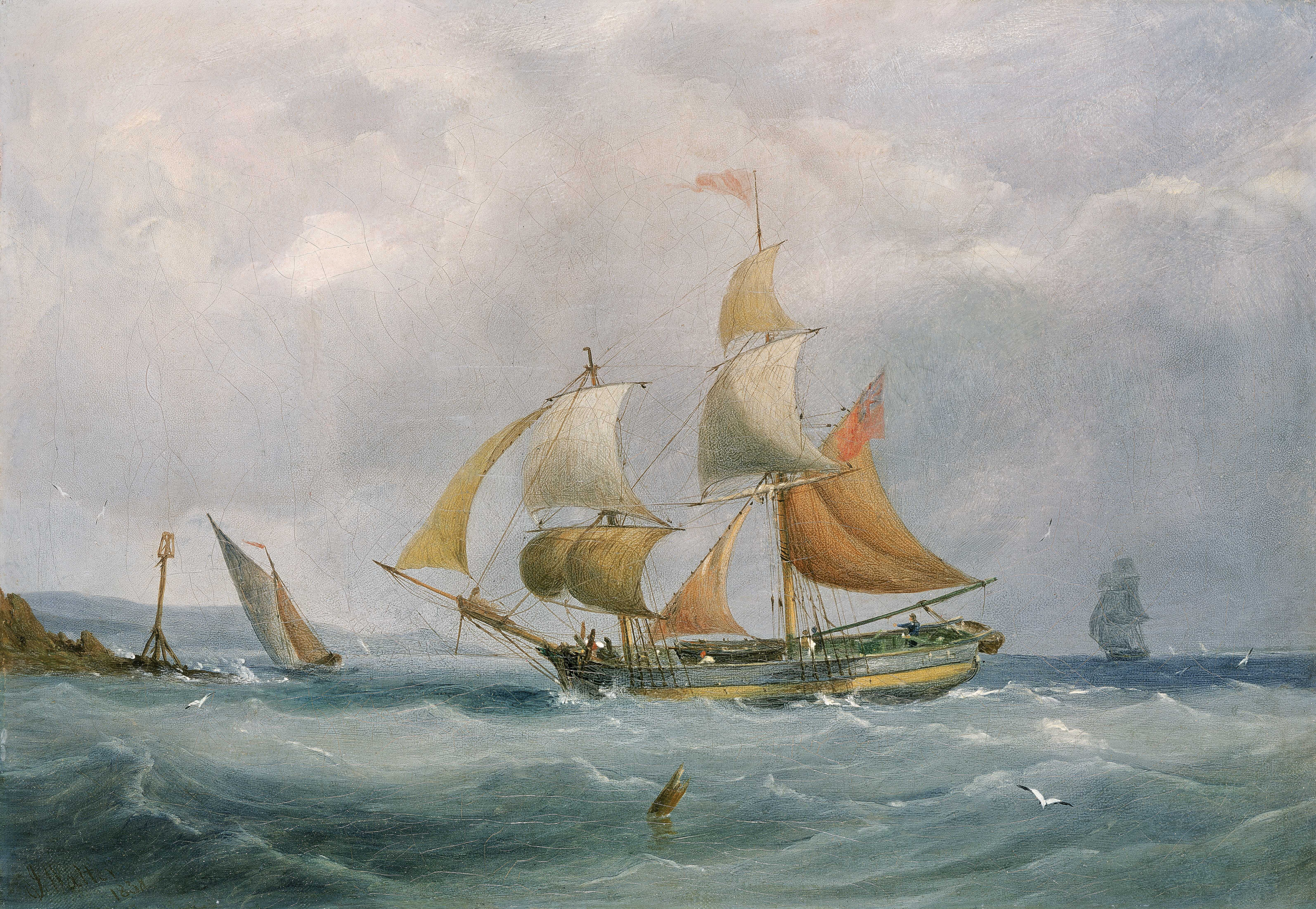
A small trading brig entering the Bristol Avon, painted by Joseph Walter

A brig is a type of sailing vessel defined by its rig: two masts which are both square-rigged. Brigs originated in the second half of the 18th century and were a common type of smaller merchant vessel or warship from then until the latter part of the 19th century. In commercial use, they were gradually replaced by fore-and-aft rigged vessels such as schooners, as owners sought to reduce crew costs by having rigs that could be handled by fewer men. In Royal Navy use, brigs were retained for training use when the battle fleets consisted almost entirely of iron-hulled steamships.

Brigs were prominent in the coastal coal trade of British waters. 4,395 voyages to London with coal were recorded in 1795. With an average of eight or nine trips per year for one vessel, that is a fleet of over 500 colliers trading to London alone. Other ports and coastal communities were also served by colliers trading to Britain's coal ports. In the first half of the 19th century, the vast majority were rigged as brigs, and that rig was retained for longer in the northeast of England.

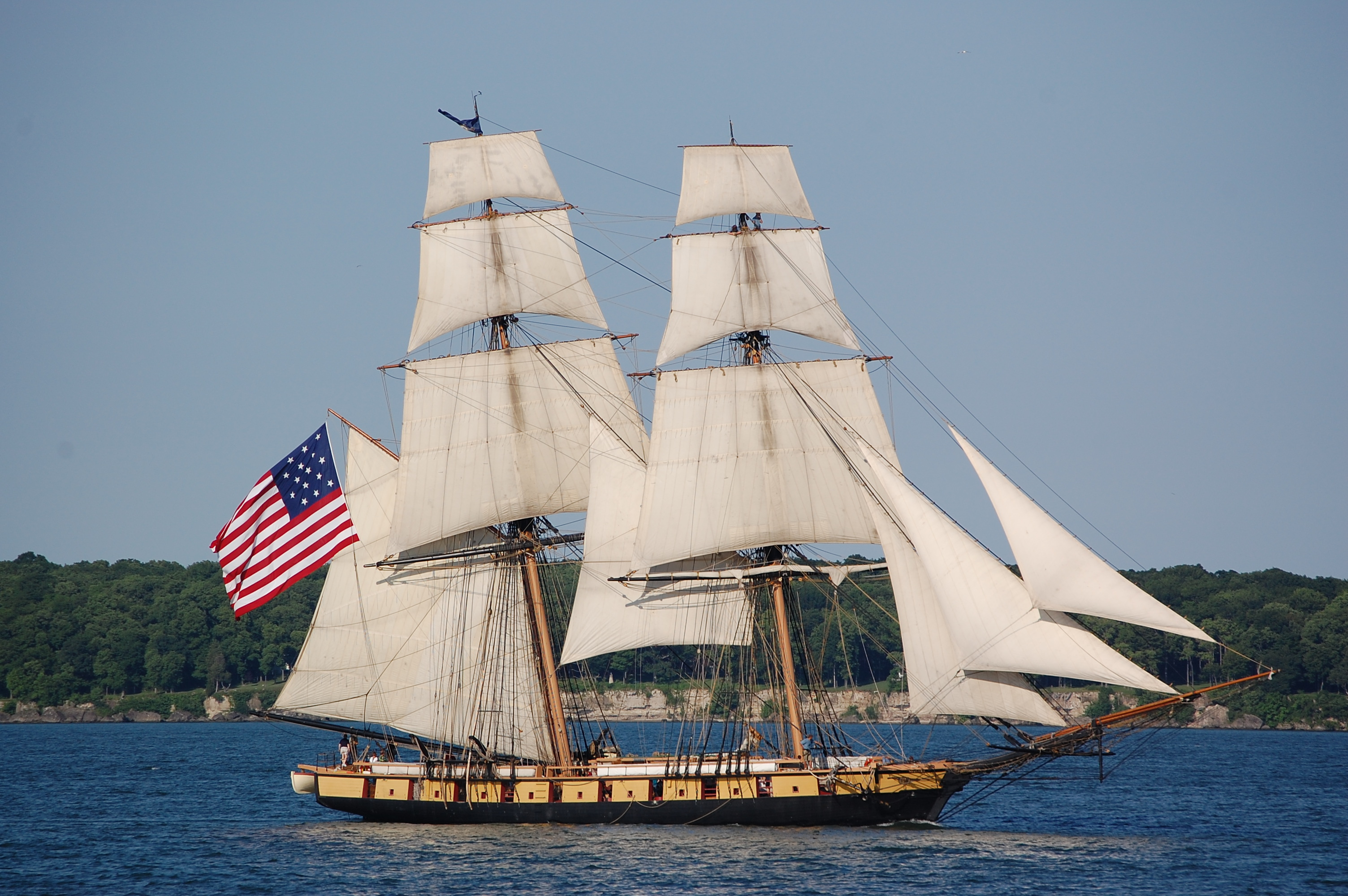
The snow brig Niagara

== Rigging ==
A typical brig sail plan

A brig is a sailing vessel with two square rigged masts (fore and main). The main mast of a brig is the after one. The mainmast carries a (gaff rigged) fore-and-aft sail.

Brig sails are named after the masts to which they are attached: the mainsail; above that the main topsail; above that the main topgallant sail; and occasionally a very small sail, called the royal, is above that. Behind the main sail there is a small fore-and-aft sail called the spanker or boom mainsail (it is somewhat similar to the main sail of a schooner). On the foremast is a similar sail, called the trysail. Attached to the respective yards of square-rigged ships are smaller spars, which can be extended, thus lengthening the yard, thus receiving an additional sailing wing on each side. These are called studding sails, and are used with fair and light wind only. The wings are named after the sails to which they are fastened, i.e. the main studding sails, main top studding sails, and the main top gallant studding sails, etc.

A brig's foremast is smaller than the main mast. The fore mast holds a fore sail, fore top sail, fore top gallant sail, and fore royal. Between the fore mast and the bowsprit are the fore staysail, jib, and flying jib. All the yards are manipulated by a complicated arrangement of cordage named the "running rigging". This is opposed to the standing rigging which is fixed, and keeps mast and other objects rigid.

== Hull material ==
A brig is "generally built on a larger scale than a schooner, and may approach the magnitude of a full-sized, three-masted ship." Brigs vary in length between 75 and 165 ft (23 and 50 m) with tonnages up to 480. A notable exception being the famous designer Colin Mudie's 'Little Brigs' (TS Bob Allen and TS Caroline Allen), which are only 30 ft (9 m) long and weigh only 8 tonnes. Historically, most brigs were made of wood, although some later brigs were built with hulls and masts of steel or iron. A brig made of pine in the 19th century was designed to last for about twenty years (many lasted longer).

== Development of the brig ==
The word brig has been used in the past as an abbreviation of brigantine (which is the name for a two-masted vessel with foremast fully square rigged and her mainmast rigged with both a fore-and-aft mainsail, square topsails and possibly topgallant sails). The brig actually developed as a variant of the brigantine. Re-rigging a brigantine with two square-rigged masts instead of one gave it greater sailing power. The square-rigged brig's advantage over the fore-and-aft rigged brigantine was "that the sails, being smaller and more numerous, are more easily managed, and require fewer men or 'hands' to work them." The variant was so popular that the term brig came to exclusively signify a ship with this type of rigging. By the 17th century the British Royal Navy defined "brig" as having two square rigged masts.

== Historic usage ==
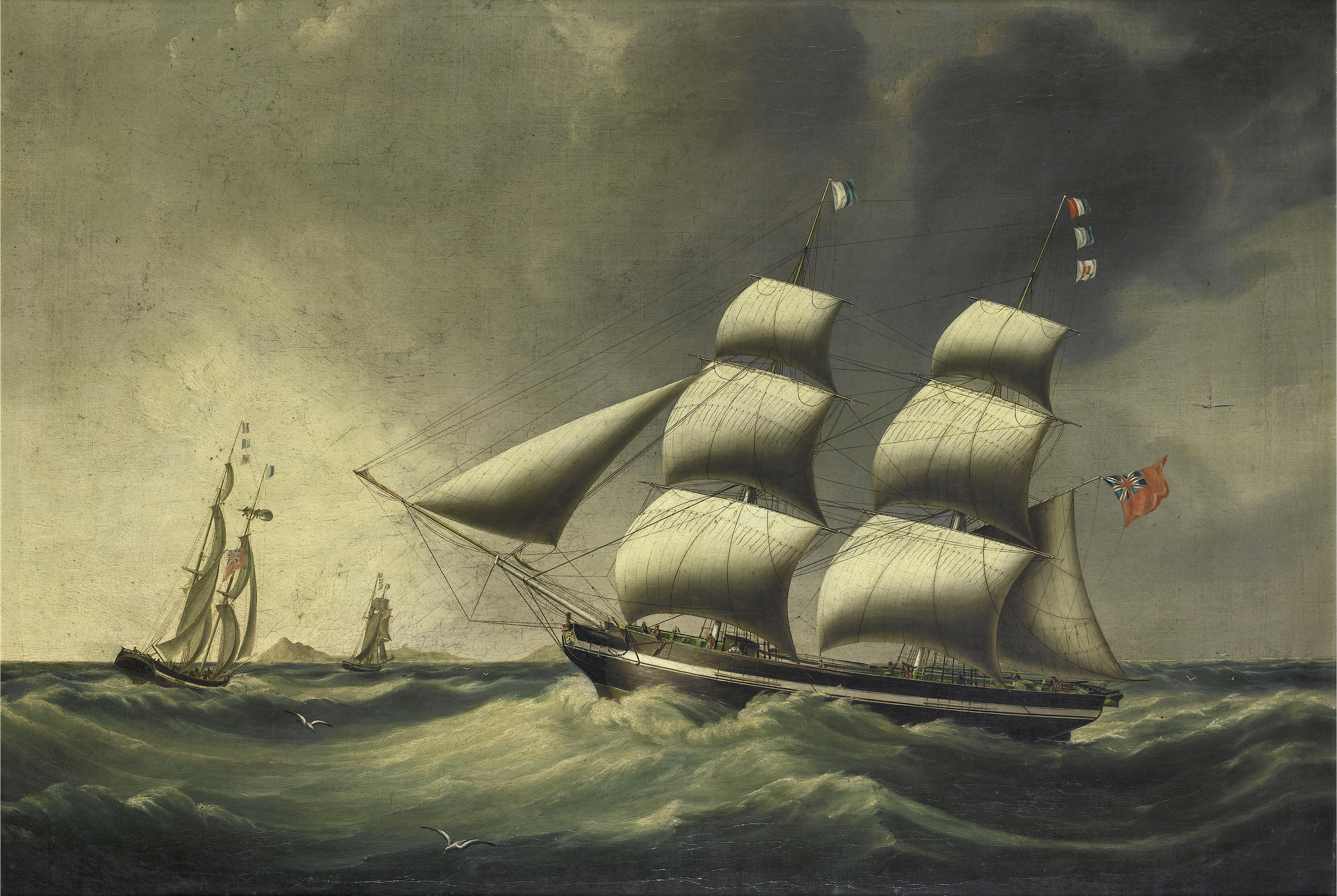
Rimac, a brig built by Brocklebank in Whitehaven in 1834 for trade between Peru and Liverpool

Brigs were used as small warships carrying about 10 to 18 guns. Due to their speed and maneuverability they were popular among pirates (though they were rare among American and Caribbean pirates). While their use stretches back before the 17th century, one of the most famous periods for the brig was during the 19th century when they were involved in famous naval battles such as the Battle of Lake Erie. In the early 19th century the brig was a standard cargo ship. It was seen as "fast and well sailing", but required a large crew to handle its rigging.

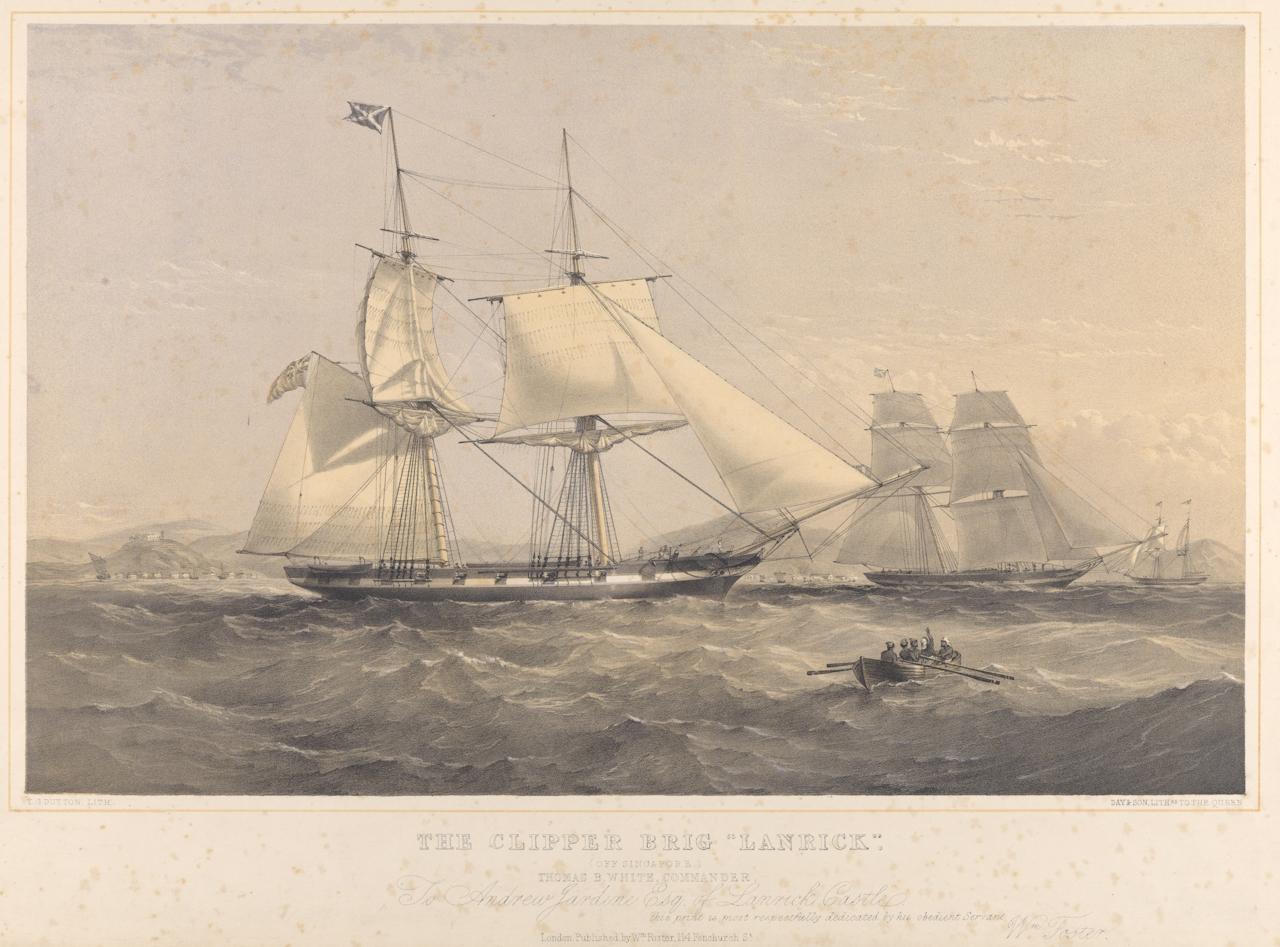
The opium clipper Lanrick with the main topsail aback (to reduce speed)

Brigs were seen as more manoeuvrable than schooners. James Cook requested the conversion of the schooner HMS Grenfell to a brig, with the justification of the better control that he would have with a brig versus a schooner. The ability to stop the ship quickly (by backing sails) was particularly important for a vessel doing survey work. The windward ability of brigs (which depends as much on hull shape as the rig) could be comparable to or better than contemporary schooners. The author and naval officer Frederick Marryat characterised brigs as having superior windward performance to the schooners of that time. Marryat is considered, by maritime historians, to be an authoritative source on such matters.

A brig's square-rig also had the advantage over a fore-and-aft–rigged vessel when travelling offshore, in the trade winds, where vessels sailed down wind for extended distances and where "the danger of a sudden jibe was the large schooner-captain's nightmare". This trait later led to the evolution of the barquentine. The need for large crews in relation to their relatively small size led to the decline of the production of brigs. They were replaced in commercial traffic by gaffsail schooners (which needed fewer personnel) and steam boats.

== Historic examples ==
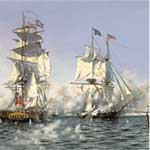
Painting of the brig USS Niagara in the 1813 Battle of Lake Erie.

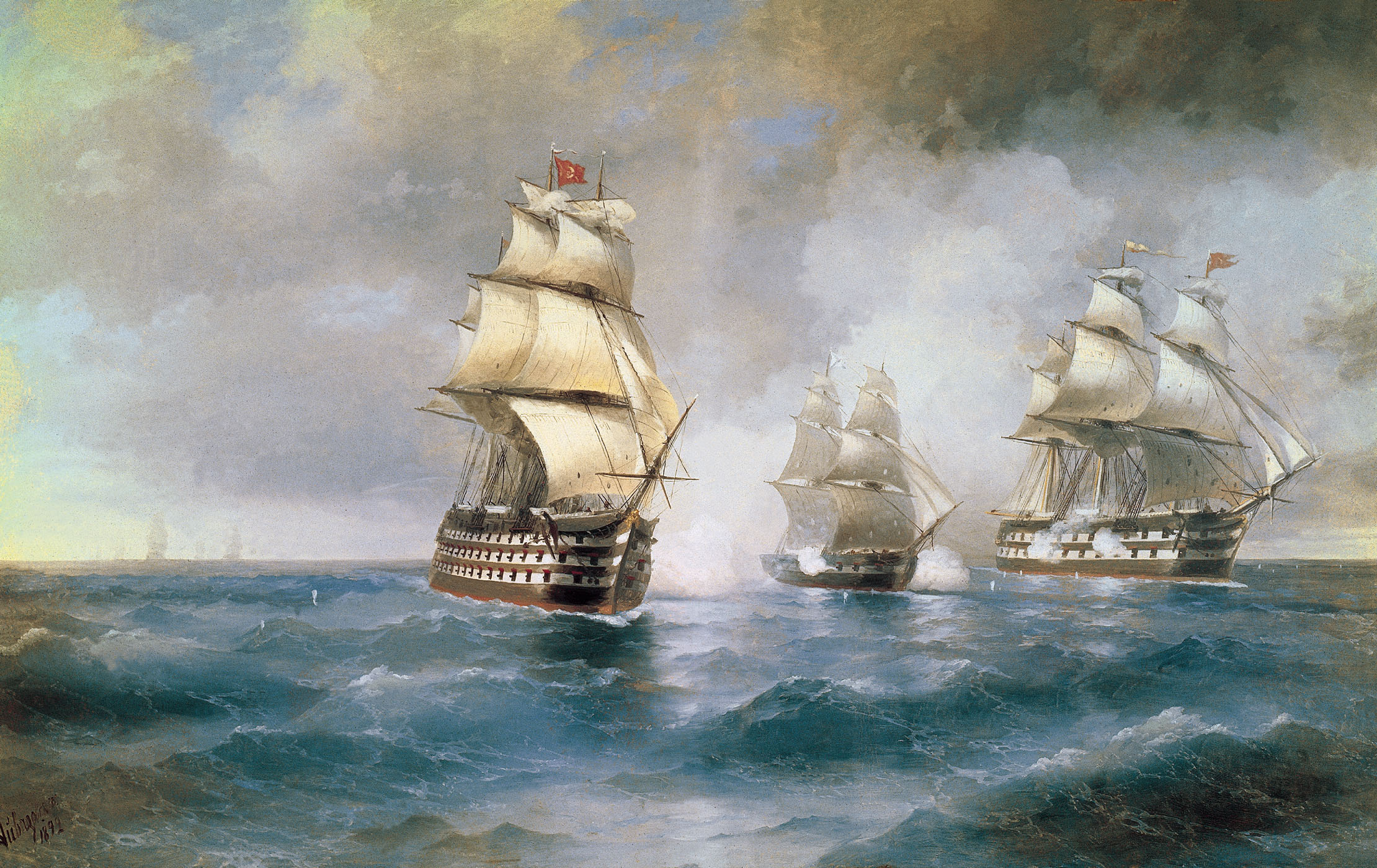
Brig "Mercury" Attacked by Two Turkish Ships, Ivan Aivazovsky, oil on canvas, 1892

- HMAT Supply, a Royal Navy tender of 180 tons burthen sailing to New South Wales as part of the First Fleet.
- HMS Pilot, a Cruizer-class brig-sloop launched in 1807. While commanded by John Toup Nicholas off southern Italy in 1810–1812, Pilot participated in the capture or destruction of over 130 enemy vessels. In 1815 she fought the last naval engagement of the Napoleonic Wars, fighting to a draw the French frigate Légère.
- USS Argus used during the First Barbary War and the War of 1812.
- Archer, a vessel of the Second Texas Navy.
- USS Oneida used during the War of 1812. James Fenimore Cooper was a midshipman aboard the Oneida while under construction.
- The cargo-hauling brig Farmer owned by George Washington.
- The cargo-hauling brig Fleetwing.
- The Bonanza of Liverpool, built as a barquentine in 1830 and converted to a brig in 1841. The first ship to bring a cargo of Peruvian guano to the UK, in 1841, setting off decades of a lucrative export trade.
- Leonora of Captain Bully Hayes.
- Mercury (Russian: Меркурий) An 1819 Russian navy 18 gun brig painted twice by Ivan Aivazovsky. On May 14, 1829, Mercury engaged in an uneven battle against 2 Turkish ships of the line, Selimiye (110 guns) and Real-Bei (74 guns) and emerged victorious from that battle, damaging both Turkish sufficiently to be not able to chase Mercury and disengaging the battle.
- HMS Lady Nelson (1798), a brig of 60 bm built as a cutter and used for exploration and settlement in the colonies of New South Wales and Van Diemen's Land, particularly the Port Philip Bay, Port Dalrymple, and Risdon Cove settlements;
- USS Niagara captained by commander Oliver Hazard Perry in the Battle of Lake Erie, a pivotal victory for the United States in the War of 1812.
- USS Oregon, used in the U.S. Exploring Expedition.
- The cargo brig Pilgrim, whose 1834 trading voyage from Boston, Massachusetts to California is described in the book Two Years Before the Mast.
- Potomac, a vessel of the Second Texas Navy
- Rebecca, captained by Robert Jenkins, whose boarding triggered the War of Jenkins' Ear.
- USS Reprisal, fought in the American Revolution.
- USS Somers, sunk in the Mexican–American War.
- HMS Beagle was built as a brig in 1820 for the Royal Navy. She was deployed as a survey vessel to survey the coasts of South America, Australia, and Africa. A mizzen mast was added prior to the 5-year voyage with Charles Darwin to increase manoeuvrability in the shallow coastal waters that she would explore.
- Jean Lafitte's pirate brig, the Pride from 1815 to 1816.
- HMS Badger, the future Admiral Horatio Nelson's first command as a young lieutenant.
- Wharton, one of the vessels of the Second Texas Navy, which participated in the Naval Battle of Campeche, which is the only historical example of a steam navy having been defeated by a sail navy.
- Joel Root as supercargo sailed out of New Haven harbor in 1802 on the brig Huron to begin his journey around the world on a sealing expedition.
- Rover was a privateer brig out of Liverpool, Nova Scotia known for several bold battles in the Napoleonic Wars.
- HMS Temeraire, "The Great Brig", an ironclad launched in 1876, the largest ship to sail with a brig rig.
- NMS Mircea was a brig of the Romanian Navy, built in London in 1882 and sunk by aircraft in April 1944.
- The Telos, built in Bangor, Maine in 1883, was reportedly the last brig to join the American merchant marine, and was "considered to be the finest vessel of her class ever constructed in Maine". She was wrecked on Aves Island, off Bonaire in the Caribbean, in 1900.
- Industry, a whaler found to have been sunk in the Gulf of Mexico.

The famous mystery ship Mary Celeste, while sometimes called a brig, was clearly a hermaphrodite brig or a brigantine.

== In fiction ==
- Arkham in H. P. Lovecraft's At the Mountains of Madness.
- Aquila in the game Assassin's Creed III.
- Beneficence in Gary R. Bush's "Sail Into Treachery"
- Blue Bird in Evert Taube's song "Balladen om briggen Blue Bird av Hull".
- Charlotta in Vilhelm Moberg's The Emigrants
- Constanzia from Jules Verne's A Drama in Mexico.
- Covenant in Robert Louis Stevenson's Kidnapped (novel).
- Duncan from Jules Verne's In Search of the Castaways.
- Enterprise in the film Star Trek Generations (portrayed by the brig Lady Washington).
- Forward from Jules Verne's The Adventures of Captain Hatteras.
- Grampus in Edgar Allan Poe's novel The Narrative of Arthur Gordon Pym of Nantucket.
- Hellebore in the Nathaniel Drinkwater series by Richard Woodman.
- HMS Sophie in Master and Commander by Patrick O'Brian.
- HMS Wolverine in L.A. Meyer's Under the Jolly Roger.
- Interceptor in the film Pirates of the Caribbean: The Curse of the Black Pearl (portrayed by the brig Lady Washington).
- Isle of Skye in Iain Lawrence's The Wreckers (High Seas Trilogy).
- Jackdaw in the game Assassin's Creed IV: Black Flag.
- Jolly Roger, a pirate ship of Captain Hook from James M. Barrie's Peter Pan.
- Lightning in Joseph Conrad's The Rescue and the brig "Bonito" in Conrad's "Freya of the Seven Isles".
- Molly Swash, in James Fenimore Cooper's book Jack Tier.
- Morrigan in the game Assassin's Creed Rogue, which was a brig-sloop.
- Porta Coeli, Flame and Amélie appear in the Horatio Hornblower series of books by C. S. Forester (later adapted to films and television).
- RattlesnakeThe 18-guner commanded by Commander Terence O'Brien in Frederick Marryat's Peter Simple.
- Sea Hawk in The Pirate of the Mediterranean by William Henry Giles Kingston.
- Seahawk in Avi's novel The True Confessions of Charlotte Doyle.
- Speedy a pirate ship from Jules Verne's The Mysterious Island.
- Triton in Ramage and the Freebooters and Governor Ramage R.N. by Dudley Pope.
- Poison Orchid in Scott Lynch's Red Seas Under Red Skies.
- Lady Caroline in Eddie Price's Rebels Abroad."
- Thousand Sunny in One Piece

== Modern brigs ==
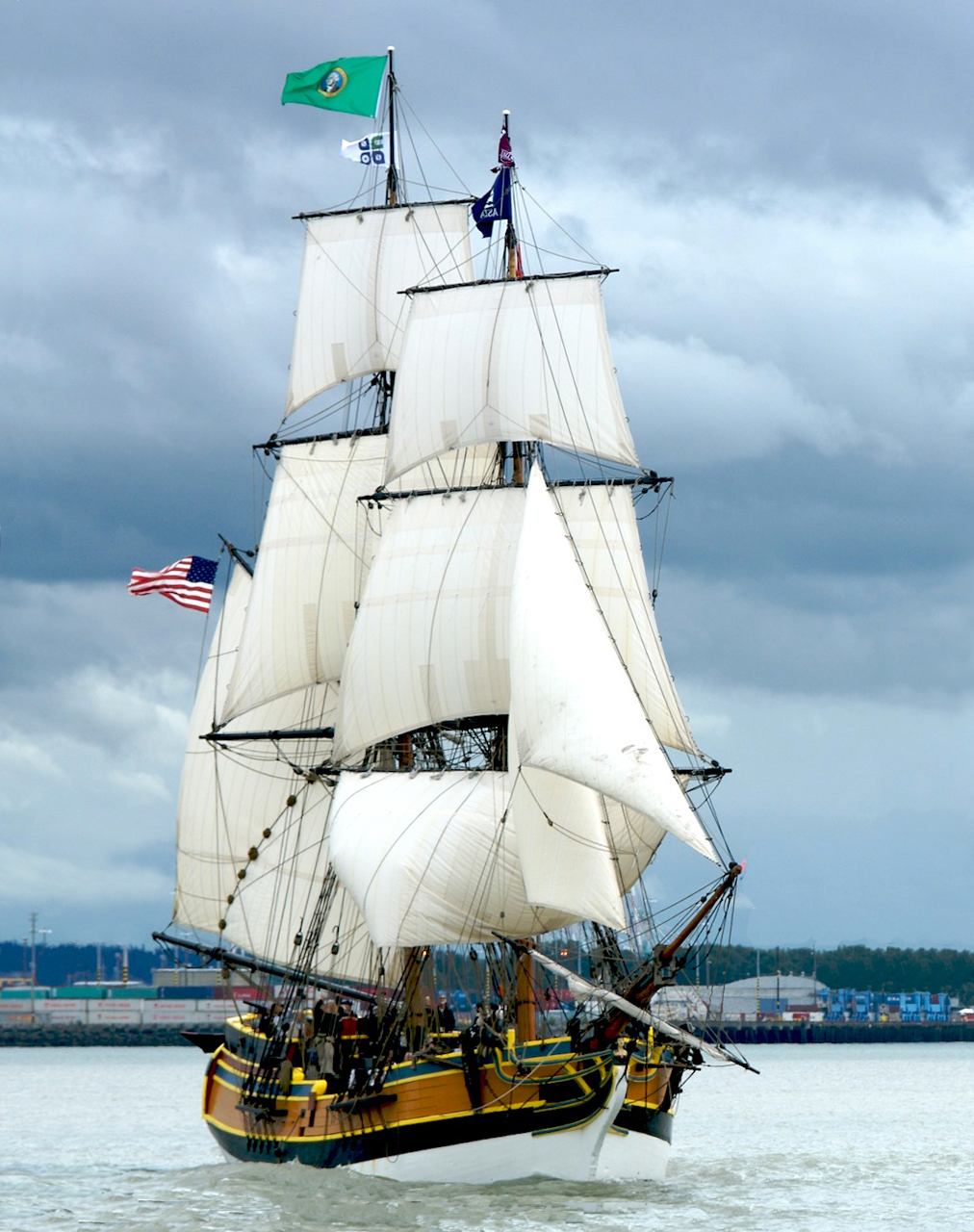
The brig Lady Washington

- Lady Washington
- Tre Kronor
- Niagara
- Morgenster
- Lady Nelson (1987 replica)
- TS Royalist
- Pilgrim
- Stavros S Niarchos and Prince William
- Roald Amundsen
- La Grace
- The 'Little Brigs' TS Bob Allen and TS Caroline Allen
- Mercedes
- Fryderyk Chopin

== See also ==
- Brig sloop
- Cruizer-class brig-sloop
- Gun-brig
- Snow (ship)
