= Jersey Honorary Police Long Service and Good Conduct Medal =

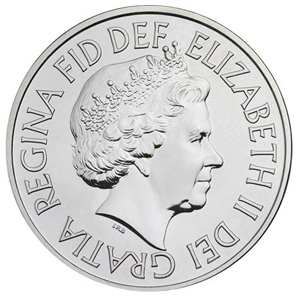
- Obverse design of the medal
- Type: Long service medal
- Awarded for: 12 years service
- Presented by: Bailiwick of Jersey
- Eligibility: Members of the Honorary Police
- Clasps: Bar for 9 subsequent years of service
- Established: 1 December 2014

Highlights
- Total: 75 (2015–17).
- Ribbon of the medal

Order of Wear
- Next (higher): Prison Services (Operational Duties) Long Service and Good Conduct Medal
- Next (lower): Merchant Navy Medal for Meritorious Service

The Jersey Honorary Police Long Service and Good Conduct Medal is a decoration for members of the Honorary Police of the Bailiwick of Jersey. First instituted by Royal Warrant on 1 December 2014, it is an official award that can be worn alongside other British medals and decorations.

It is awarded for 12 years service, with a bar awarded for each subsequent period of 9 years. To qualify for the medal a member must have been:

- In service on or after 1 January 2012; and
- Have completed the required years of service (12 years for the medal; additional periods of 9 years for a bar) which may be continuous service or an aggregate and in more than one Parish or more than one office; and
- His or her character and conduct must have been very good.

Produced by the Royal Mint, the rhodium plated cupro-nickel circular medal has the following design:

- The obverse has the Ian Rank-Broadley effigy of Queen Elizabeth II with the wording ELIZABETH II DEI GRATIA REGINA FID DEF.
- The reverse bears the coat of arms of Jersey superimposed on three crown-topped batons in front of an outline of the island, surrounded by the inscription HONORARY POLICE LONG SERVICE. JERSEY.
- The medal has a plain, straight suspender. The ribbon is red with narrow white, blue and yellow stripes at each edge.
- The recipient's rank, name and years of service are inscribed on the rim.

The professional States of Jersey Police do not qualify, but are eligible for the Police Long Service and Good Conduct Medal.
