= Ian McNaught =

Captain Sir Ian McNaught, KCVO MNM (born 1954) is a Master Mariner who served as Deputy Master of Trinity House, and was Captain of ships for Cunard and Seabourn including the last Captain of the Queen Elizabeth 2 (QE2).

== Education ==
He studied at Monkwearmouth Academy in Sunderland.

== Career ==
He started his seagoing career on oil tankers working for BP.

=== 1987–2009: Cunard ===
Captain McNaught joined Cunard in September 1987 as a Second Officer on the QE2. In 1989 he joined the Cunard Princess as First Officer. In 1991 he returned to the QE2 as First Officer until September 1994 when he was promoted to Chief Officer. In 1996 he became Chief Officer on Sea Goddess II and then Staff Captain on board the QE2 in 1999. His first command was in June 2001, when he became master of Sea Goddess I. In April 2003 he took over as the QE2's 21st master. He was in command of the QE2 on its final voyage around the UK, including to the River Tyne where an estimated 50,000 people attended to watch the ship. He remained on board, in command of the QE2 for her subsequent final voyage to Dubai in November 2008 serving as her final Captain. He then supervised the handover and transition to her new owners in Dubai.

In March 2009 he took command of MS Queen Victoria until he resigned in 2010 to join Seabourn.

=== 2010–2011: Seabourn ===
Captain McNaught took command of Seabourn Spirit in February 2010.

=== 2011–2024: Trinity House ===
Captain McNaught joined Trinity House in September 2011 as Deputy Master.

In 2019, McNaught was reported that it was not an easy decision for Trinity House to have decided to decommission the Royal Sovereign Lighthouse near Eastbourne.

In November 2022, Captain McNaught acted on behalf of the Princess Royal at the 2022 award ceremony for the UK Merchant Navy Medal for Meritorious Service.

In February 2024, Captain McNaught retired from Trinity House and was succeeded by Rear Admiral Iain Lower.

Captain Ian McNaught was made a Freeman of the city of London on 5th December 2023. He was elected to the Court of the Honourable Company of Master Mariners on 26th April 2024.

== Awards ==
In 2019, he was appointed Commander of the Royal Victorian Order in the New Year Honours List, and in the 2024 King's Birthday Honours, he was promoted to a Knight Commander of the Royal Victorian Order (KCVO).

He is a recipient of the Merchant Navy Medal for Meritorious Service.

== Personal life ==
He is married to Susan and has one son, Steven.
