= Dublin Port and Docks Act 1869 =

Act of the Parliament of the United Kingdom

Dublin Port and Docks Act 1869 (Note: Section 1.)
- Act of Parliament
- Parliament of the United Kingdom
- Long title: An Act to consolidate and amend the several Acts relating to the Port and Harbour of Dublin and the Dublin Port and Docks Board; and for other purposes.
- Citation: 32 & 33 Vict. c. c
- Territorial extent: Ireland

Dates
- Royal assent: 12 July 1869
- Commencement: 12 July 1869 (Note: The Acts of Parliament (Commencement) Act 1793.)

Other legislation
- Amends: See § Repealed enactments
- Repeals/revokes: See § Repealed enactments
- Amended by: Harbours Act 1996
- Relates to: Dublin Port Act 1867; Dublin Port and Docks Act 1879; Dublin Port and Docks Act 1898; Dublin Port and Docks Act 1902; Dublin Port and Docks Act 1919

Status: Partially repealed

Text of statute as originally enacted

Text of the Dublin Port and Docks Act 1869 as in force today (including any amendments) within the United Kingdom, from legislation.gov.uk.

The Dublin Port and Docks Act 1869 (32 & 33 Vict. c. c) is an act of the Parliament of the United Kingdom that consolidated enactments related to the port and harbour of Dublin and the Dublin Port and Docks Board in Ireland.

== Provisions ==
The act restated and amended the powers of the Corporation for Preserving and Improving the Port of Dublin, reconstituted as the Dublin Port and Docks Board by the Dublin Port Act 1867 (30 & 31 Vict. c. lxxxi), in respect of pilotage, ballast, tonnage and timber rates, the care and superintendence of the River Liffey and its quays and bridges, the docks and graving docks of the board, and the board's borrowing powers, which the earlier acts had conferred piecemeal. The several acts of the Parliament of Ireland and of the Parliament of the United Kingdom relating to the board were described in the first schedule to the act and referred to in the body of the act by the short descriptions given in that schedule.

=== Repealed enactments ===
Section 6 of the act repealed 13 enactments, listed in the second schedule to the act.

Citation	Short title	Description	Extent of repeal
Acts of the Parliament of Ireland
26 Geo. 3. c. 19 (I)	Dublin Port Act 1786	The original Act.	The whole act except sections 5, 6, 7, 9, 10, 11, 12, 13, 14, 15, and 16, and so much of section 8 as relates to the making of rules, orders, and byelaws.
26 Geo. 3. c. 32 (I)	Dublin Improvement Act 1786	The Act of 1786.	Section 15.
32 Geo. 3. c. 35 (I)	City of Dublin Act 1792	The Act of 1792.	The whole act.
33 Geo. 3. c. 54 (I)	City of Dublin Act 1793	The Act of 1793.	The whole act.
34 Geo. 3. c. 8 (I)	River Anna Liffey Fire Prevention Act 1794	The Act of 1794.	The whole act.
40 Geo. 3. c. 47 (I)	City of Dublin (Improvement) Act 1800	The first Act of 1800.	The whole act.
Acts of the Parliament of the United Kingdom
43 Geo. 3. c. cxxvii	Dublin Harbour, River and Bridges Act 1803	The Act of 1803.	The whole act.
51 Geo. 3. c. 66	Irish Lighthouses Act 1811	The Act of 1811.	The whole act.
52 Geo. 3. c. liii	Dublin Port Improvement and Ormond Bridge Replacement Act 1812	The Act of 1812.	Sections 5 and 12.
28 & 29 Vict. c. xlvi	Dublin Port (Tramways) Act 1865	The Tramways Act of 1865.	The whole act.
29 & 30 Vict. c. xxiv	Dublin Port Acts Amendment Act 1866	The Amendment Act of 1866.	The whole act.
29 & 30 Vict. c. xxv	Dublin Port (Docks) Act 1866	The Docks Act of 1866.	The whole act.
30 & 31 Vict. c. lxxxi	Dublin Port Act 1867	The Act of 1867.	Sec. 83.

The schedule provided that the title of any act not fully described in it would be found at length in the first schedule to the act.

== Subsequent developments ==
Section 214 of the act was repealed by section 5(2) of, and the second schedule to, the Harbours Act 1996 of the Oireachtas, which dissolved the Dublin Port and Docks Board and transferred its functions to the Dublin Port Company. The remainder of the act has not been repealed.
