= Commissioners of Irish Lights =

General Lighthouse Authority for Northern Ireland and the Republic of Ireland

- Coimisinéirí Soilse na hÉireann

- Flag
- Predecessor: Irish Lights Department, Port of Dublin Corporation
- Formation: 1867
- Type: Statutory corporation
- Purpose: General lighthouse authority
- Headquarters: Dún Laoghaire, Ireland
- Services: Navigational aids
- Key people: Mark Barr, Chairperson; Yvonne Shields O'Connor, Chief executive
- Website: Official website

The Commissioners of Irish Lights (Irish: Coimisinéirí Soilse na hÉireann), often shortened to Irish Lights or CIL, is the body that serves as the general lighthouse authority for Northern Ireland and the Republic of Ireland and their adjacent seas and islands. As the lighthouse authority for the island of Ireland it oversees the coastal lights and navigation marks provided by the local lighthouse authorities, the county councils and port authorities.

Irish Lights is funded through light dues paid into the General Lighthouse Fund (GLF) by ships calling both in Ireland (including the Republic of Ireland and Northern Ireland) and in Great Britain. The General Lighthouse Fund is managed by the Secretary of State for Transport in the United Kingdom and is split between the three General Lighthouse Authorities.

== History ==
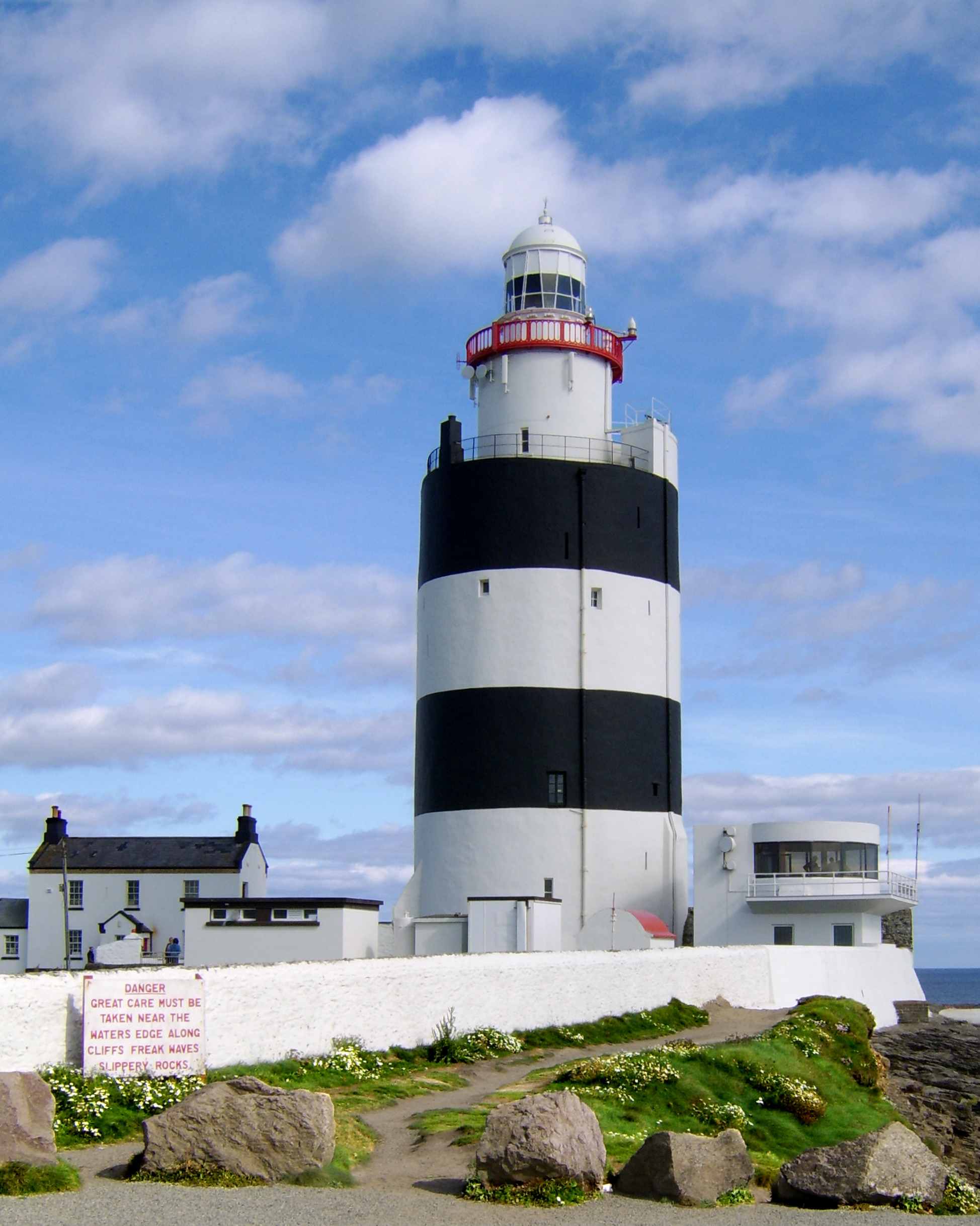
Hook Lighthouse is one of the oldest lighthouses in Ireland

Signal fires to guide shipping have long existed. Hook Head has the oldest nearly continuous light in Ireland, originally a signal fire or beacon tended by the monk Dubhán in the fifth century. Monks continued to maintain the light until the Cromwellian conquest of Ireland in 1641.

Charles II re-established the lighthouse in 1667. He granted a patent for the erection of six lighthouses to Robert Reading, some replacing older lighthouses, at Hook Head, Baily Lighthouse at Howth Head, Howth sand-bar, Old Head of Kinsale, Barry Oge's castle (now Charlesfort, near Kinsale), and the Isle of Magee.

In 1704, Queen Anne transferred the lighthouses around the Irish coast to the Revenue Commissioners.

Dublin Port Act 1786 (Note: Short title given by the Statute Law Revision Act 2007 (No. 28))
- Act of Parliament
- Parliament of Ireland
- Long title: An Act for Promoting the Trade of Dublin, by rendering its Port and Harbour more commodious
- Citation: 26 Geo. 3. c. 19 (I)
- Territorial extent: Ireland

Dates
- Royal assent: 8 May 1786
- Commencement: 19 January 1786 (Note: Start of session.)
Other legislation
Amended by	City of Dublin Act 1792; City of Dublin Act 1793

Status: Amended

Text of statute as originally enacted

The Corporation for Preserving and Improving the Port of Dublin was established under the Dublin Port Act 1786, an act of Grattan's Parliament of Ireland. The Commissioners of Irish Lights note that their modern constitution is "essentially the same today as was laid down in that Act."

Lighthouses (Ireland) Act 1810
- Act of Parliament
- Parliament of the United Kingdom
- Long title: An Act to enable the Corporation for preserving and improving the Port of Dublin, to erect, repair and maintain Light Houses round the Coasts of Ireland, and to raise a Fund for defraying the Charge thereof.
- Citation: 50 Geo. 3. c. 95
- Territorial extent: United Kingdom

Dates
- Royal assent: 15 June 1810
- Commencement: 15 June 1810 (Note: The Acts of Parliament (Commencement) Act 1793.)
- Repealed: 1 May 1855
Other legislation
Repealed by	Merchant Shipping Repeal Act 1854

Status: Repealed

Text of statute as originally enacted

Irish Lighthouses Act 1811
- Act of Parliament
- Parliament of the United Kingdom
- Long title: An Act to amend and render more effectual several Acts for promoting the Trade of Dublin, by rendering its Port and Harbour more commodious: and for erecting, repairing and maintaining Light Houses round the Coast of Ireland, and to raise a Fund for defraying the Charge thereof.
- Citation: 51 Geo. 3. c. 66
- Territorial extent: United Kingdom

Dates
- Royal assent: 10 June 1811
- Commencement: 10 June 1811
Other legislation
Amended by	{{ubliMerchant Shipping Repeal Act 1854|Dublin Port and Docks Act 1869}}

Status: Amended

Text of statute as originally enacted

Dublin Port Act 1867 (Note: Section 1.)
- Act of Parliament
- Parliament of the United Kingdom
- Long title: An Act to alter the Constitution of the Corporation for preserving and improving the Port of Dublin, and for other Purposes connected with that Body and with the Port of Dublin Corporation.
- Citation: 30 & 31 Vict. c. lxxxi
- Territorial extent: United Kingdom

Dates
- Royal assent: 17 June 1867
- Commencement: 17 June 1867 (Note: Section 2.)
Other legislation
Amended by	Dublin Port and Docks Act 1869

Status: Amended

Text of statute as originally enacted

The Lighthouses (Ireland) Act 1810 transferred responsibility for all lighthouses around Ireland's coast to the Corporation for Preserving and Improving the Port of Dublin, with the lighthouse operation becoming known as the Irish Lights Board.

The Dublin Port Act 1867 renamed the 'Corporation for Preserving and Improving the Port of Dublin' into two organisations: that of (i) the Dublin Port and Docks Board with responsibility for Dublin Port only, and (ii) the Commissioners of Irish Lights, with responsibility for lighthouses, lightships, buoys and beacons around the coast of Ireland in its entirety, acting as the general lighthouse authority for the island.

These acts, modified by the Irish Lights Commissioners (Adaptation) Order 1935, remain the legislative basis for the CIL.

Irish Lights has moved its headquarters from Dublin to a purpose-built new building in Harbour Road, Dún Laoghaire.

Handover of responsibility to the Foyle, Carlingford and Irish Lights Commission as envisioned by the 1998 Good Friday Agreement has not occurred.

== Ships ==
=== Granuaile III ===
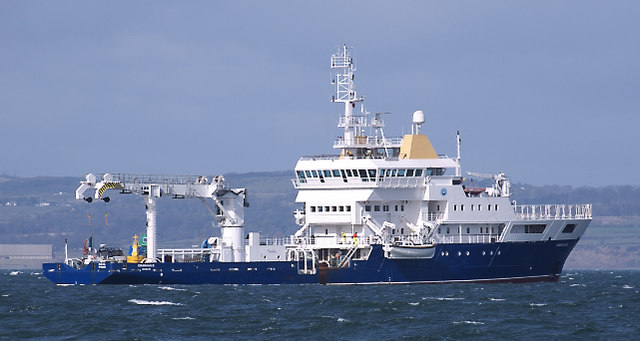
The ILV Granuaile in 2010

Because of the automation of lighthouses, and the use of helicopters, CIL now only operates one vessel, ILV Granuaile III (ILV meaning Irish Lights Vessel), named after the pirate queen Grace O'Malley. Delivered in 2000, she was built at Galați shipyard, Romania, fitted out at Damen Shipyards in the Netherlands. She has a 2,625 gross tonnage (GT), length of 79.69 metres (261.5 ft) and is fitted with Class I dynamic positioning system. In 2003 she was involved in the recovery of the fishing boat Pisces, which sank off Fethard, County Wexford, in July 2002. She is the third Granuaile to have served with the CIL. The first Granuaile served from 1948 to 1970, followed by Granuaile II from 1970 and 2000.

=== Former vessels ===
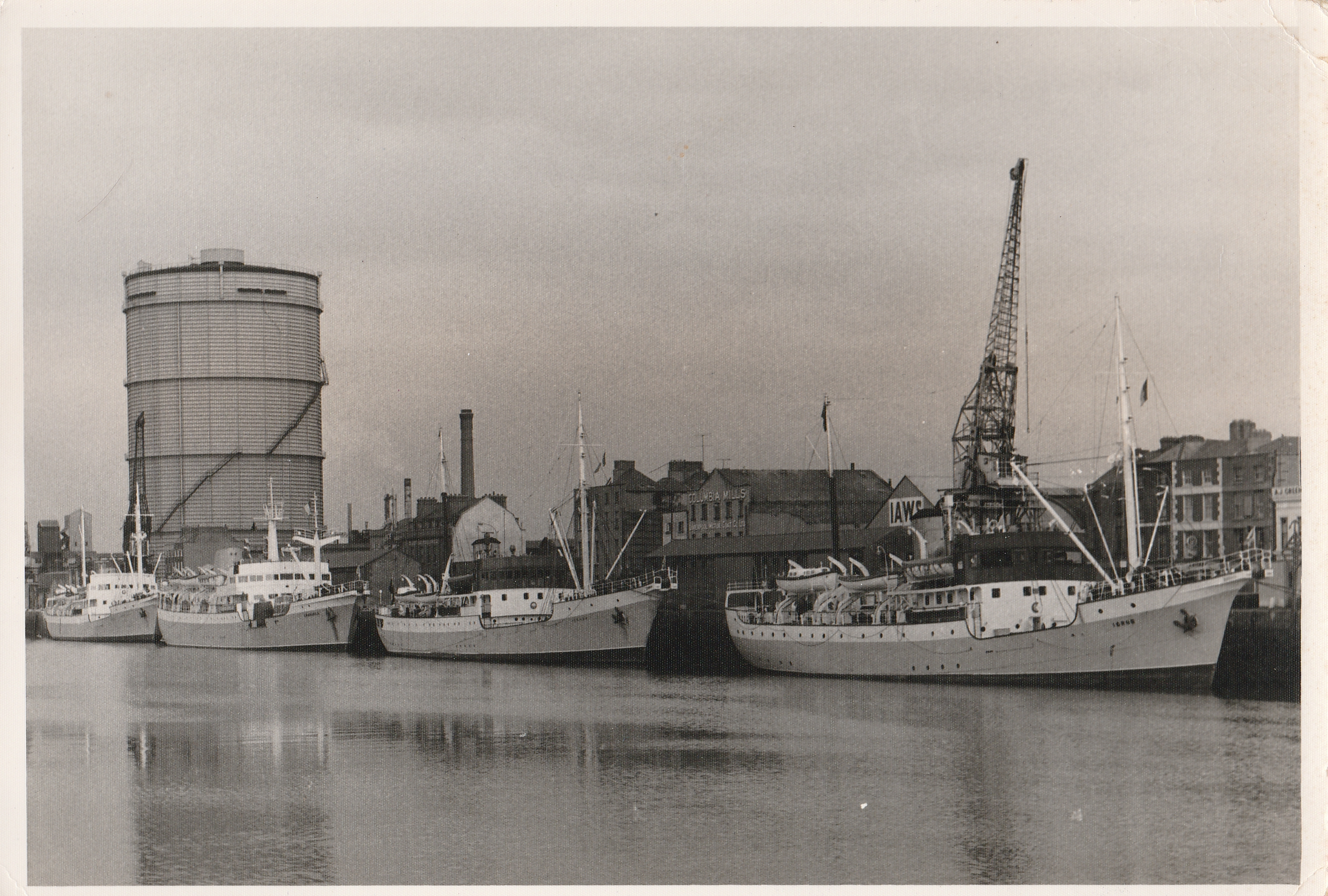
Part of the fleet moored against Sir John Rogerson's Quay, Dublin in 1971 (From L to R: Irish Lights Tenders (ILT) Ierne II, Isolda, Granuaile II, and Atlanta)

- Princess Alexandra (1863–1904)
- Tearaght (1892–1928) – see Kingstown Lifeboat Disaster
- Moya (1893–1905)
- Ierne (1898–1954)
- Alexandra (1904–1955)
- Deirdre (1919–1927)
- Nabro (1926–1949)
- Isolda (1928–1940) (Sunk off the Saltee Islands, County Wexford by German aircraft)
- Discovery II (1947–1948)
- Valonia (1947–1962)
- Granuaile (1948–1970)
- Blaskbeg (1953–1955)
- Isolda (1953–1976), sold to Irish Naval Service, renamed LÉ Setanta
- Ierne II (1955–1971)
- Atlanta (1959–1988)
- Granuaile II (1970–2000)
- Gray Seal (1988–1994)

== Flags ==
Original flag of the CIL, used until 1970

Ensign flown by CIL vessels in Northern Ireland

The Commissioners of Irish Lights is a cross-border body, with its headquarters in Dublin. The current flag of the Irish Lights features lightships and lighthouses between the arms of the St. Patrick's Cross. The St. George's Cross was used until 1970. CIL vessels in Northern Ireland fly the Blue Ensign defaced with the commissioners' badge and those in the Republic fly the Irish tricolour.

== Infrastructure ==
The CIL operate and maintain the majority of the aids to navigation around the Irish coastline. This includes 64 lighthouses, 20 beacons and over 100 buoys. It also operates more than 100 automatic identification system transmitters, and 23 radar beacons.

== See also ==
- Lighthouses in Ireland
- Lightvessels in Ireland
- Northern Lighthouse Board, the general lighthouse authority for Scotland and the Isle of Man
- Trinity House, the general lighthouse authority for England, Wales, the Channel Islands, and Gibraltar
