= Trinity House =

Official authority for lighthouses in England and Wales

- Corporation of Trinity House of Deptford Strond

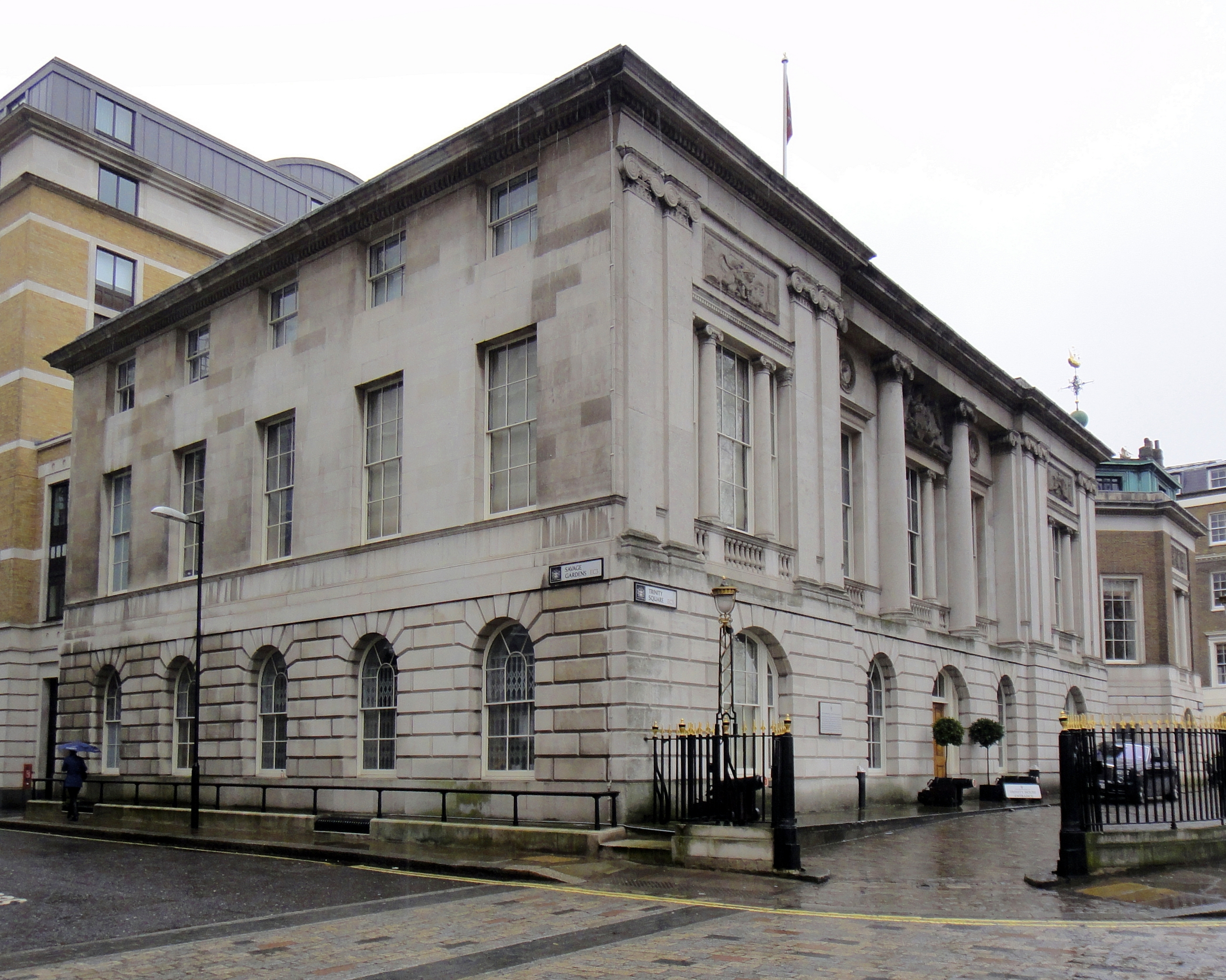
- Trinity House headquarters, Tower Hill, London, built in 1796.
- Formation: 20 May 1514
- Founded at: Deptford, Kent
- Legal status: General lighthouse authority and Charitable organisation
- Purpose: Maintenance of navigation aids
- Headquarters: Trinity House, Tower Hill, London
- Region served: England; Wales; Channel Islands; Gibraltar
- Members: 31 Elder Brethren; c. 400 Younger Brethren
- Master: Anne, Princess Royal
- Deputy master: Iain Lower
- Revenue: £37,907,000 (2022)
- Expenses: £44,208,000 (2022)
- Staff: 283 (2022)
- Website: www.trinityhouse.co.uk

Trinity House, (Note: Formally the Corporation of Trinity House of Deptford Strond, or The Master, Wardens and Assistants of the Guild Fraternity or Brotherhood of the most glorious and undivided Trinity and of St Clement in the Parish of Deptford Strond in the County of Kent) founded by Royal Charter in 1514, is the general lighthouse authority for England, Wales, the Channel Islands, and Gibraltar. It maintains navigational aids such as lightvessels and buoys, as well as communications services and pilotage for ships in the North Sea. These are financed by dues levied on commercial vessels calling at ports in the British Isles.

In addition, Trinity operates a registered charity, which provides welfare services for retired seamen, education, and promoting safety at sea. Funding for this is generated separately.

== History ==
Trinity House was established as a result of a petition dated 19 March 1513 from a group of mariners based in Deptford, who wanted to regulate pilotage services on the River Thames. On 20 May 1514, Henry VIII granted a Royal Charter to "The Master, Wardens, and Assistants of the Guild, Fraternity, or Brotherhood of the most glorious and undivided Trinity, and of St Clement in the Parish of Deptford Strond in the County of Kent."

Their general business was listed as "to improve the art and science of mariners; to examine into the qualifications, and regulate the conduct of those who take upon them the charge of conducting ships; to preserve good order, and (when desired) to compose differences in marine affairs, and, in general, to consult the conservation, good estate, wholesome government, maintenance and increase of navigation and sea-faring men; and to relieve decayed seamen and their relatives."

The Sea Marks Act 1566 further authorised the Corporation to set up and maintain "beacons, marks, and signs for the sea" along the Thames, and in 1594 this was expanded to all public buoys in England.

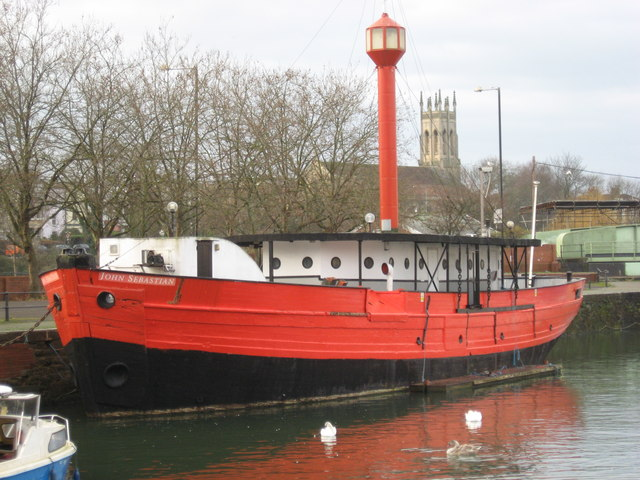
The John Sebastian, Trinity House L.V. No 55 (1886 built as a batch order of three, LV54, LV55 and LV59) in Bathurst Basin, Bristol

With the increasing number of ships lost along the Newcastle to London coal route, in 1609 Trinity House established the Lowestoft Lighthouse, a pair of wooden towers with candle illuminants. Until the late 18th century, candle, coal, or wood fires were used as lighthouse illuminants, improved in 1782 with the circular-wick oil-burning Argand lamp, the first ‘catoptric’ mirrored reflector in 1777, and Fresnel’s ‘dioptric’ lens system in 1823. The Nore lightship was established as the world's first floating light in 1732. In 1803, the corporation established the Blackwall Depot as a buoy workshop, and six district depots were later established at Harwich, Great Yarmouth, East Cowes, Penzance, Holyhead and Swansea.

Under the 1836 Lighthouses Act, Trinity became the sole governing body for all British lighthouses, and any remaining private owners bought out. By 1847, revenue collected from this source was £11,000 to £12,000 per year.

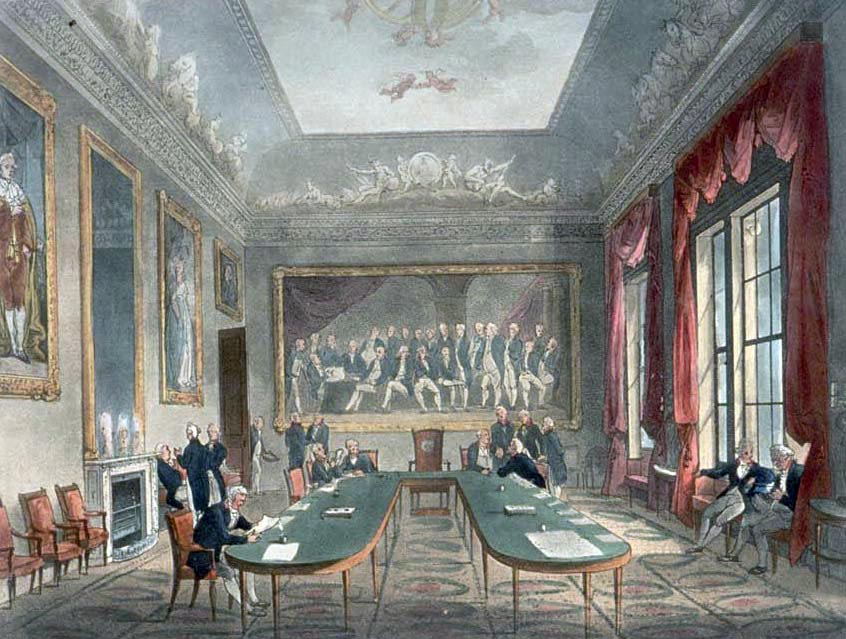
A meeting at Trinity House c. 1808

During the First World War, the corporation served a number of functions: it buoyed shipping lanes and naval operations, moved lightvessels, and laid hundreds of buoys. During the Second World War, Trinity House kept sea lanes marked and lighted for Allied convoys. The Pilotage Service guided ships to their ports under hazardous conditions; at the time of the Dunkirk evacuation, a number of pilots helped in piloting vessels to and from the beaches.

On the night of 29 December 1940, Trinity House was destroyed by the most severe of the air attacks on London; the interiors were completely gutted and many archives and treasures were lost. (The restored building was reopened by Elizabeth II on 21 October 1953.)

In preparation for the D-Day landings on 6 June 1944, Trinity House laid 73 lighted buoys and two lightvessels to indicate a safe route for landing craft. Trinity House pilots were responsible for all commercial vessels involved and many of the service vessels. In the month following D-Day, nearly 3,000 vessels were handled by 88 river pilots and nearly 2,000 ships by 115 sea pilots working day and night.

By the 1960s, Trinity House licensed about 500 pilots, of whom about 350 were in the London District, handling an estimated 60% of the nation's piloted tonnage. The Pilotage Act 1987 authorised Trinity House to pass its District Pilotage responsibilities to various local harbour authorities, becoming instead a licensing authority for deep sea pilotage.

In 1969, Trinity House initiated the debut of helicopter reliefs to and from offshore lighthouses, succeeding the boat reliefs. These had been susceptible to being delayed by months during inclement weather. Trinity House played a major part in the design of the IALA Maritime Buoyage System, laying the first buoy off Dover, watched over by representatives of 16 nations on 15 April 1977.

The completion of the lighthouse automation programme came with a ceremony held at the North Foreland Lighthouse on 26 November 1998, attended by the last six keepers and master, Prince Philip, Duke of Edinburgh. On 9 June 1989, the last crewed lightvessel was towed from the Channel lightvessel station to Harwich.

In December 2002, Trinity House closed depots at Great Yarmouth, Penzance and East Cowes. Operations are currently run out of Harwich, with a support depot in Swansea and flight operations base at St Just in Penwith. It also has three support vessels, the tenders THV Patricia and THV Galatea, and Rapid Intervention Vessel THV Alert. A small headquarters staff remains at Tower Hill.

Richard Woodman served as elder brethren and member of the court from 2000 until his death in 2024. In 2011, Anne, Princess Royal succeeded her father as Master. She was aboard Trinity House Motor Boat No.1 during the Thames Diamond Jubilee Pageant.

In 2014, the Royal Mint issued a two pound coin commemorating the 500th anniversary of the grant of Trinity House's royal charter.

From 2011 to 2024, Ian McNaught, a merchant navy officer served as deputy master. In 2024, he was succeeded as deputy master and chief executive by Rear-Admiral Iain Lower.

== Master of the Corporation ==
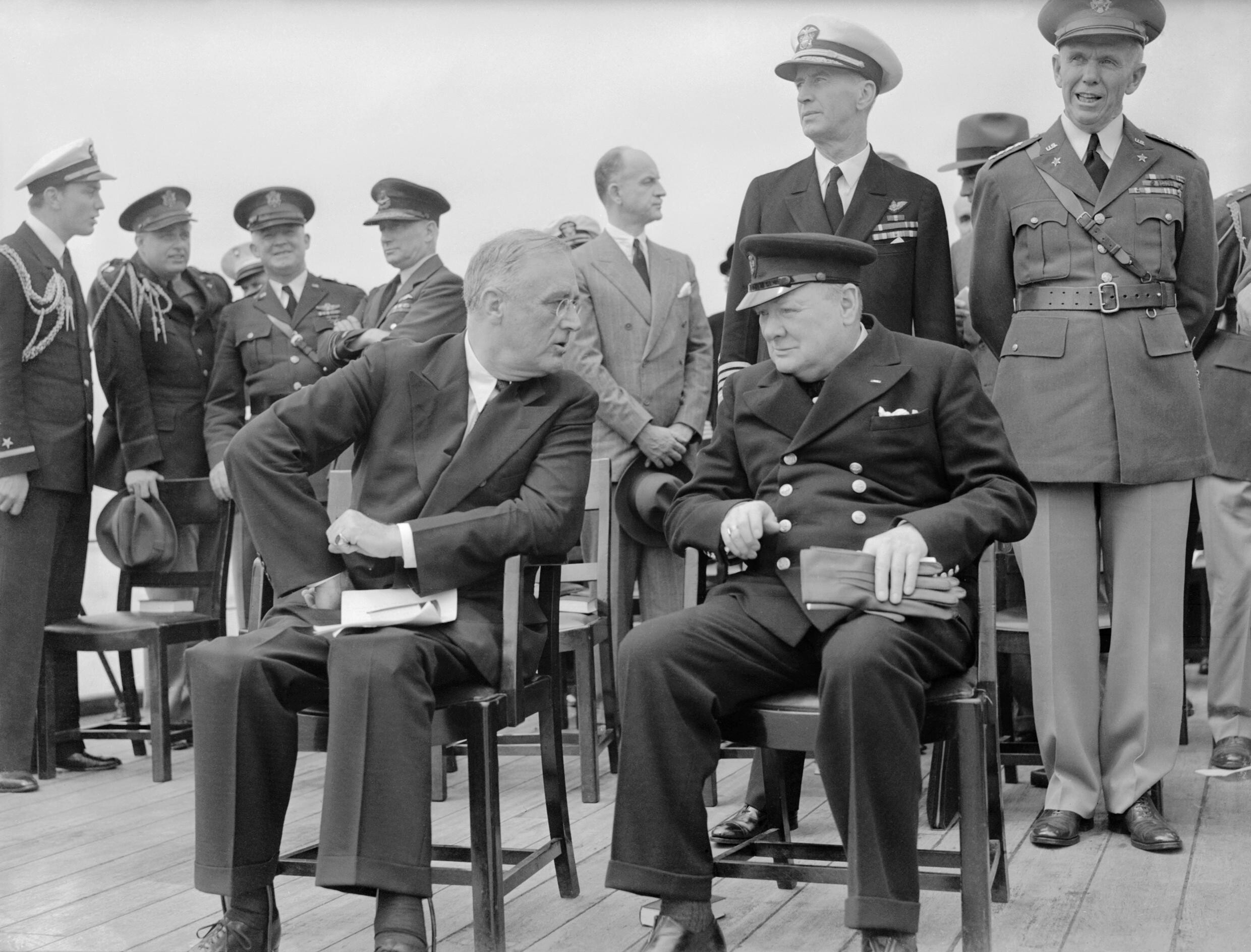
Churchill in his Trinity House uniform at the Atlantic Conference

The honorary title of Master of the Corporation is currently held by Anne, Princess Royal. Previous Masters include Prince Philip, Duke of Edinburgh; Vice-Admiral Sir Thomas Spert, master of the warship Henry Grace à Dieu under Henry VIII; the diarist Samuel Pepys; William Pitt the Younger; Field Marshal the Duke of Wellington; and Admiral Sir William Penn (father of William Penn, founder of Pennsylvania).

Other prominent individuals in Britain, often connected with commercial shipping or the Admiralty, have been associated with Trinity House, including Winston Churchill. He gained his status as an elder brother of Trinity House as a result of his position as First Lord of the Admiralty before and during the First World War. Often, especially on naval-related forays during the Second World War, Churchill was seen wearing the Trinity House cap or uniform. Churchill also had a Trinity House vessel (THV) named after him, THV Winston Churchill.

== Governance ==
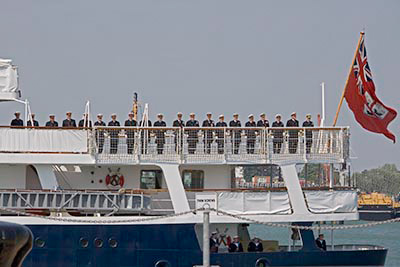
Elder Brethren during Trafalgar 200

Trinity House is ruled by a court of thirty-one elder brethren, presided over by its master. These are appointed from 300 Younger Brethren who act as advisors and perform other duties as needed. The younger brethren are appointed from lay people with maritime experience, mainly naval officers and ships' masters, but also harbourmasters, pilots, yachtsmen, and anyone with useful experience.

== Headquarters ==
The headquarters of the corporation are the present Trinity House, which was designed by architect Samuel Wyatt and built in 1796. It has a suite of five state rooms with views over Trinity Square, the Tower of London and the River Thames.

== Trinity High Water ==
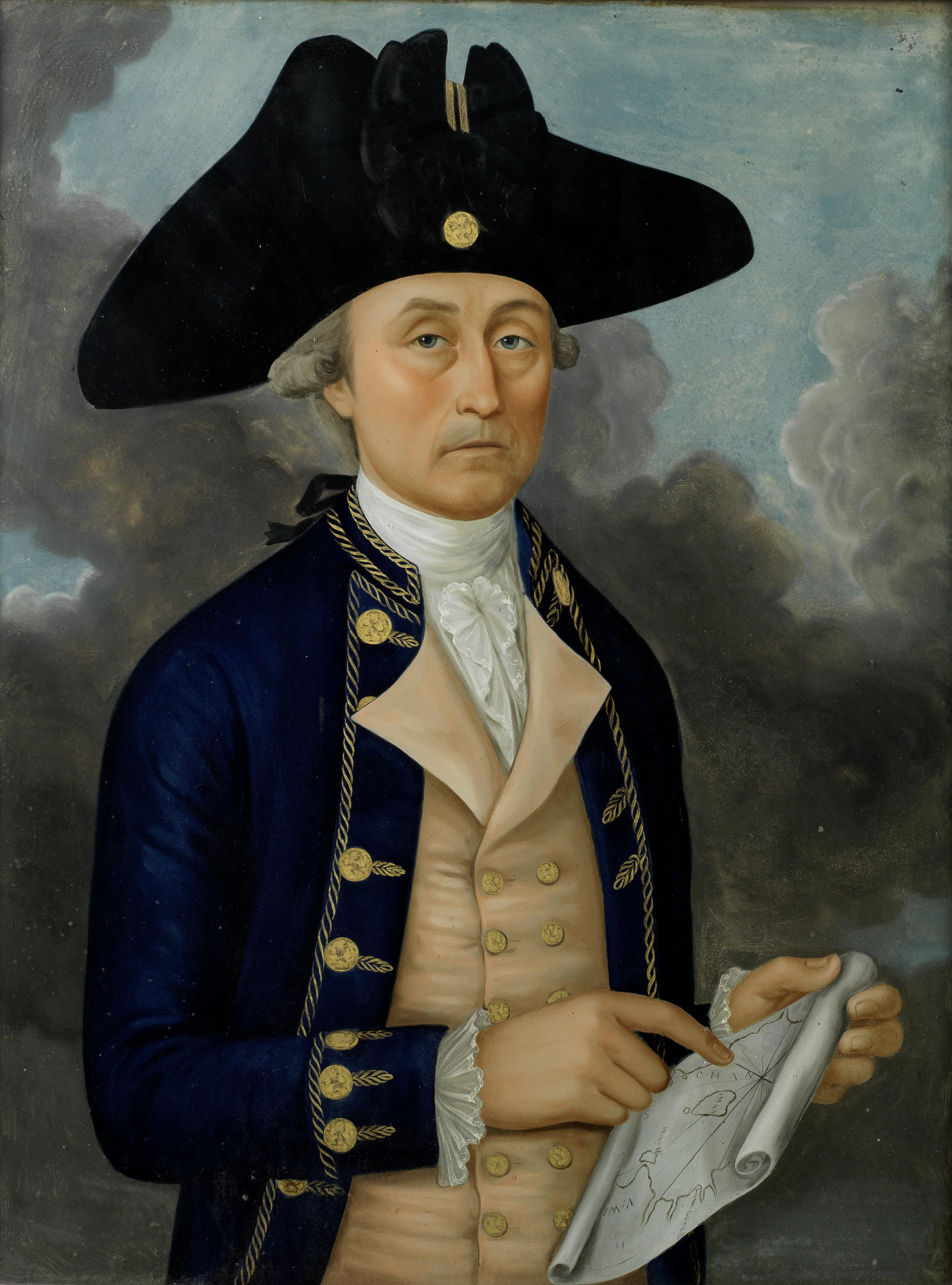
Capt. Joseph Huddart, Elder Brother, set the Trinity House stones

Trinity High Water (or High Water, Trinity Standard), abbreviated THW, was a vertical datum used for legal purposes in the River Thames and informally over a much wider area. Though not thus defined, it was about 12 feet 6 inches (3.81 m) above mean sea level.

The concept had its origin in the London Dock Act 1800 (39 & 40 Geo. 3. c. xlvii) which authorised the making of the Wapping basin of the London Docks and specified its minimum depth ie. over the sill. At that time there was no Ordnance Datum or other accepted vertical benchmark. Therefore, the 1800 Act defined the benchmark for this dock as "the level of the river at low-water mark". Since opinions about this might vary, it added:

The same shall be settled and determined by two of the Elder Brothers of the Trinity House, within three calendar months next after the passing of this Act, who shall certify the same in writing under their hands and seals.

Accordingly, Trinity House — in the person of Captain Joseph Huddart — set a stone in the external wing wall of the Hermitage Entrance to the London Docks. It was inscribed

Low water mark is 17 feet 10 inches below the lower edge of this stone, settled by the Corporation of Trinity House Aug^{t}. MDCCC

Similar stones were afterwards set for Wapping and Shadwell entrances.

This established a benchmark which was supposedly extended for further purposes eg. the sill heights of other docks and for high water also.

Trinity High Water was marked on the bridges in the tidal Thames and at each such location denoted the average level attained by the highest normal (spring) tides; occasional freak tides could rise several feet higher.

Trinity High Water Mark was much used as a datum in London for legal purposes. It was required to be marked on all drawings of property adjacent to the river when submitted to the Thames Conservancy. As another example, the minimum height of river walls were specified in feet and inches above T.H.W. The benchmark was used in other contexts, such as "Luton is 400 feet above Trinity high-water"; the elevations of water reservoirs; depths in the Geological Survey (London Basin); the depth of an archaeological find; and for railway elevations.

Despite the importance of the Trinity Standard benchmark for legal purposes, it appears that there were discrepancies, some of them grave. Inconsistent standards purporting to be T.H.W. existed. Some stones set by Captain Huddart afterwards could not be found.

Eventually, it was deemed by the Port of London Act 1968 to be a level having a value of 11.4 feet (3.5 m) above Ordnance Datum Newlyn. and thus the connection with the Trinity House marker stones was abandoned.

== Nautical assessors ==
In legal cases involving issues of navigation or seamanship eg. collisions at sea, Elder Brethren of Trinity House act as expert nautical advisors to the Admiralty Court in London. Usually, two elder brethren sit with the Admiralty judge. Their function is not to decide the case themselves, but to advise the presiding judge about the practicalities of seamanship and ship handling. When this happens, the parties are not allowed to produce expert witnesses of their own without a special reason, since the court considers itself to be well enough advised already. But if one of the colliding ships was a Trinity House vessel, Elder Brethren cannot be employed. Elder Brethren may perform the same functions in appeals.

In a 2020 case about a multiple ship collision in the Suez Canal the Admiralty judge wrote a 306-paragraph judgement ending thus:

I am grateful to Trinity House and its Elder Brethren for the expert and wholly independent advice they give to the Admiralty Court (and have given for over four centuries) on questions of seamanship and ship handling. Trinity House, since its incorporation in 1514, has been dedicated to the safety of navigation and the advice given by the Elder Brethren enables the Admiralty Court to ensure that its decisions reflect and uphold the standards and requirements of good seamanship... [O]ne of the functions of the Admiralty Court is to help to avoid collisions in the future, [and] Trinity House has an essential role in ensuring that that function of the Admiralty Court is discharged.

== Operational responsibilities and role ==
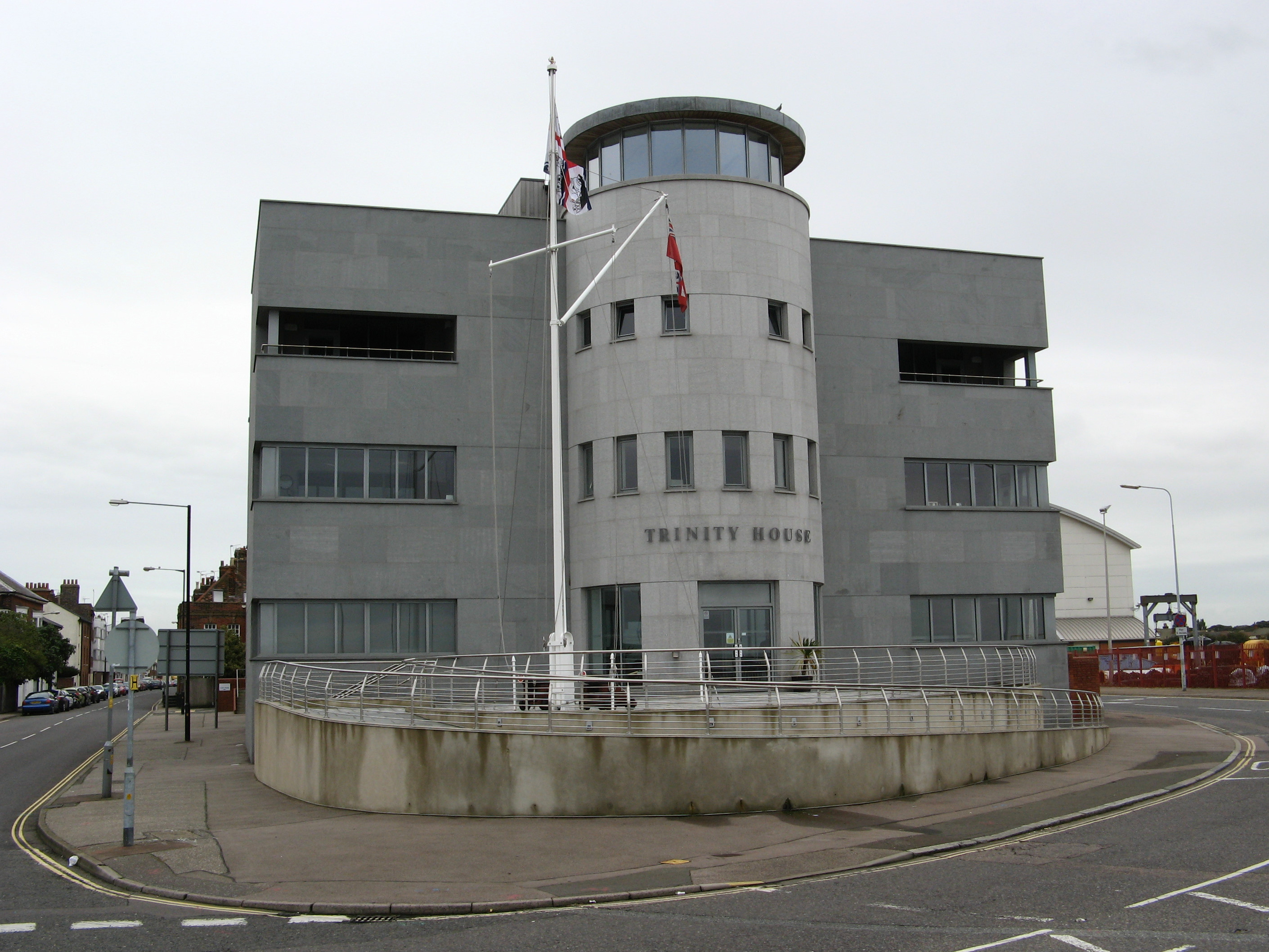
Trinity House, Harwich, Essex

Trinity House has three main functions:

1. It is the General Lighthouse Authority for England, Wales, the Channel Islands and Gibraltar, responsible for a range of general aids to navigation, 'signs of the sea', from lighthouses to radar beacons.
2. It is a charitable organisation dedicated to the safety, welfare and training of mariners.
3. It is a Deep Sea Pilotage Authority, licensing expert navigators to act as deep sea pilots for ships trading in Northern European waters.

The Corporation also inspects buoys provided by local harbour authorities. It no longer provides local pilots for entering ports. Contrary to popular belief, Trinity House is not (and never has been) part of HM Coastguard, although it does work closely with HM Maritime and Coastguard Agency.

Trinity House's activities as a lighthouse authority are financed from "light dues" levied on commercial shipping calling at ports in the United Kingdom.

== Assets ==
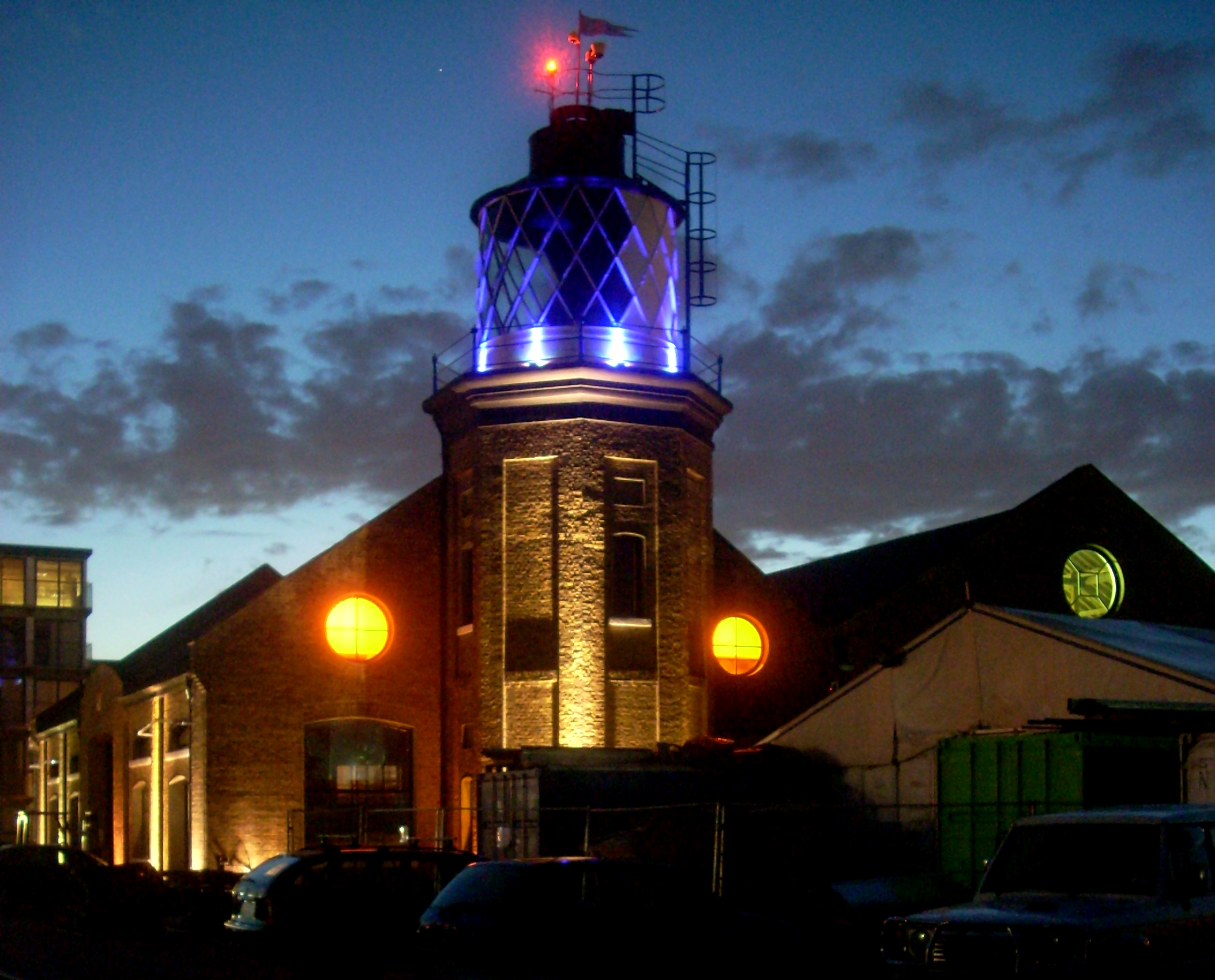
One of a pair of experimental lighthouses at Trinity Buoy Wharf, used by Faraday and later used for training (closed 1988)

- Lighthouses in England
- Lightvessels in the United Kingdom

=== Lighthouses ===
Trinity House maintains 65 lighthouses ranging from isolated rock towers like the Eddystone to mainland towers like Southwold lighthouse.

All Trinity House lighthouses have been automated since November 1998, when the UK's last staffed lighthouse, North Foreland in Kent, was converted to automatic operation. Lighthouse automation began as long ago as 1910, thanks to an invention of Gustaf Dalén, whose sun valve was fitted in a number of lighthouses powered by acetylene gas. Its vital component was a black metal rod suspended vertically and connected to the gas supply which, as it absorbed the sun's heat, the rod expanded downwards, cutting off the gas during the day.

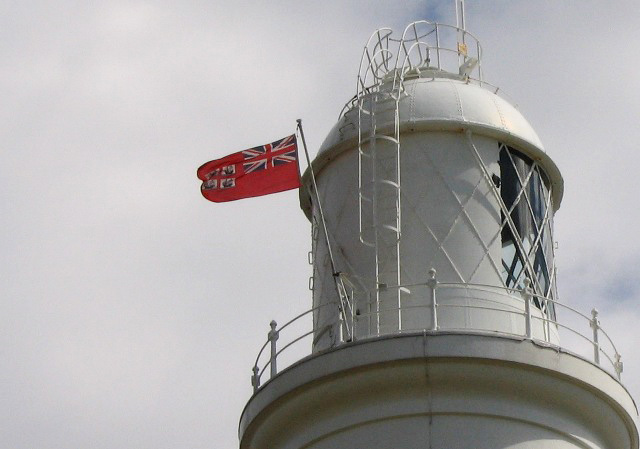
Trinity House Flag flying at Portland Bill Lighthouse, Dorset

Automation in the modern context began in the early 1980s, made possible firstly by the construction of lantern-top helipads at remote rock lighthouses, to enable the rapid transfer of technicians to a lighthouse in the event of a breakdown, and secondly, by the development of remote control technology, which enables all lighthouses and lightvessels to be monitored and controlled from the Trinity House Operations and Planning Centre at Harwich, Essex.

The other general lighthouse authorities elsewhere in the British Isles are:

- Commissioners of Irish Lights — Ireland (Northern Ireland and Republic of Ireland)
- Northern Lighthouse Board (formerly Commissioners of Northern Lights) — Scotland and Man

=== Vessels ===
==== Ships ====
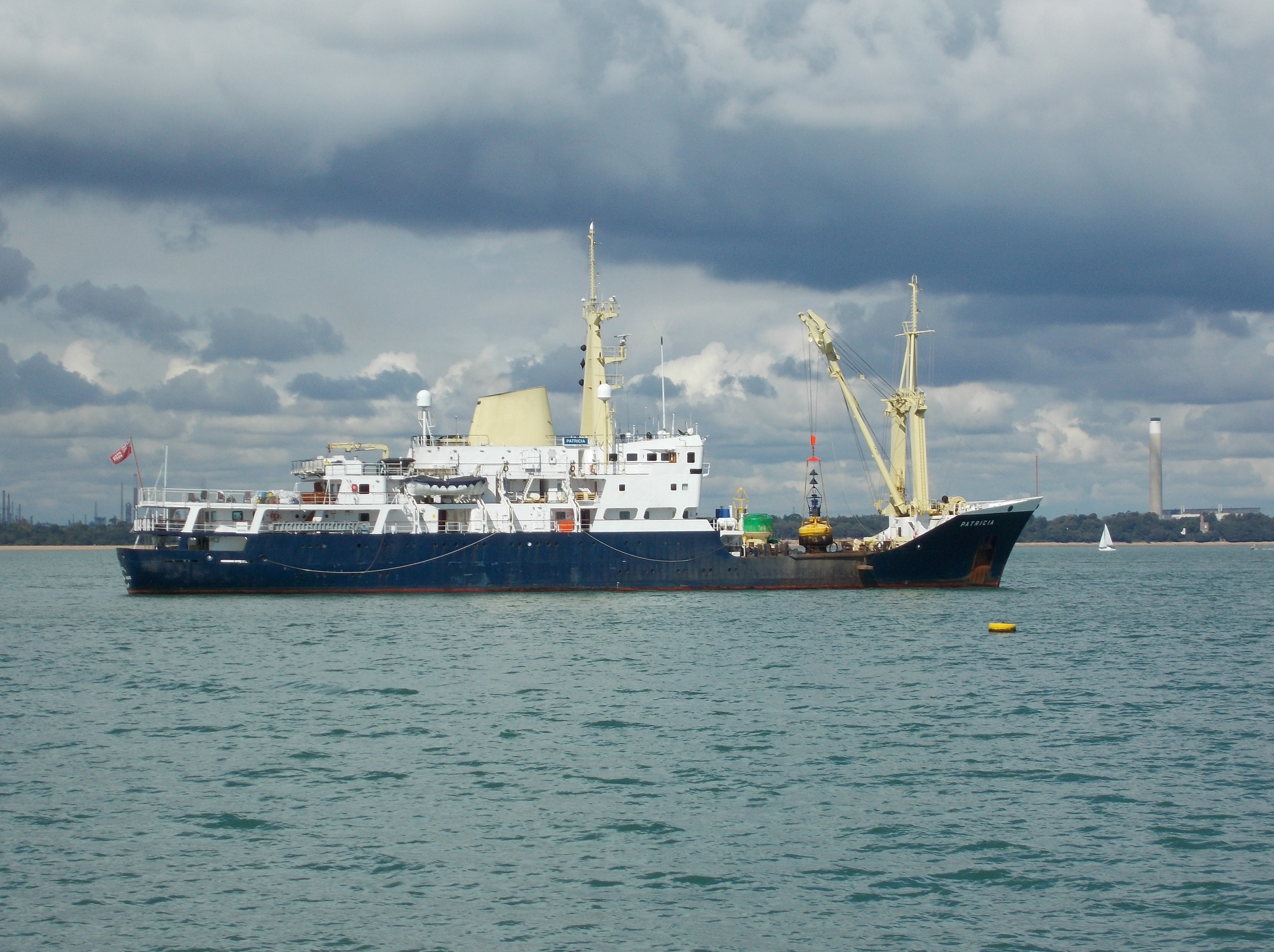
THV Patricia, off Cowes, Isle of Wight (September 2017)

Trinity House vessels have the ship prefix THV. As of 2020 three such vessels operate around the coast of England, Wales and the Channel Islands.

- THV Patricia (1982) is an 86.3-metre (283 ft) multi-functional tender that carries out maintenance work on navigation aids, towing, wreck location and marking. She has a helicopter-landing pad, a 20-tonne main crane and 28-tonne bollard pull and towing winch.

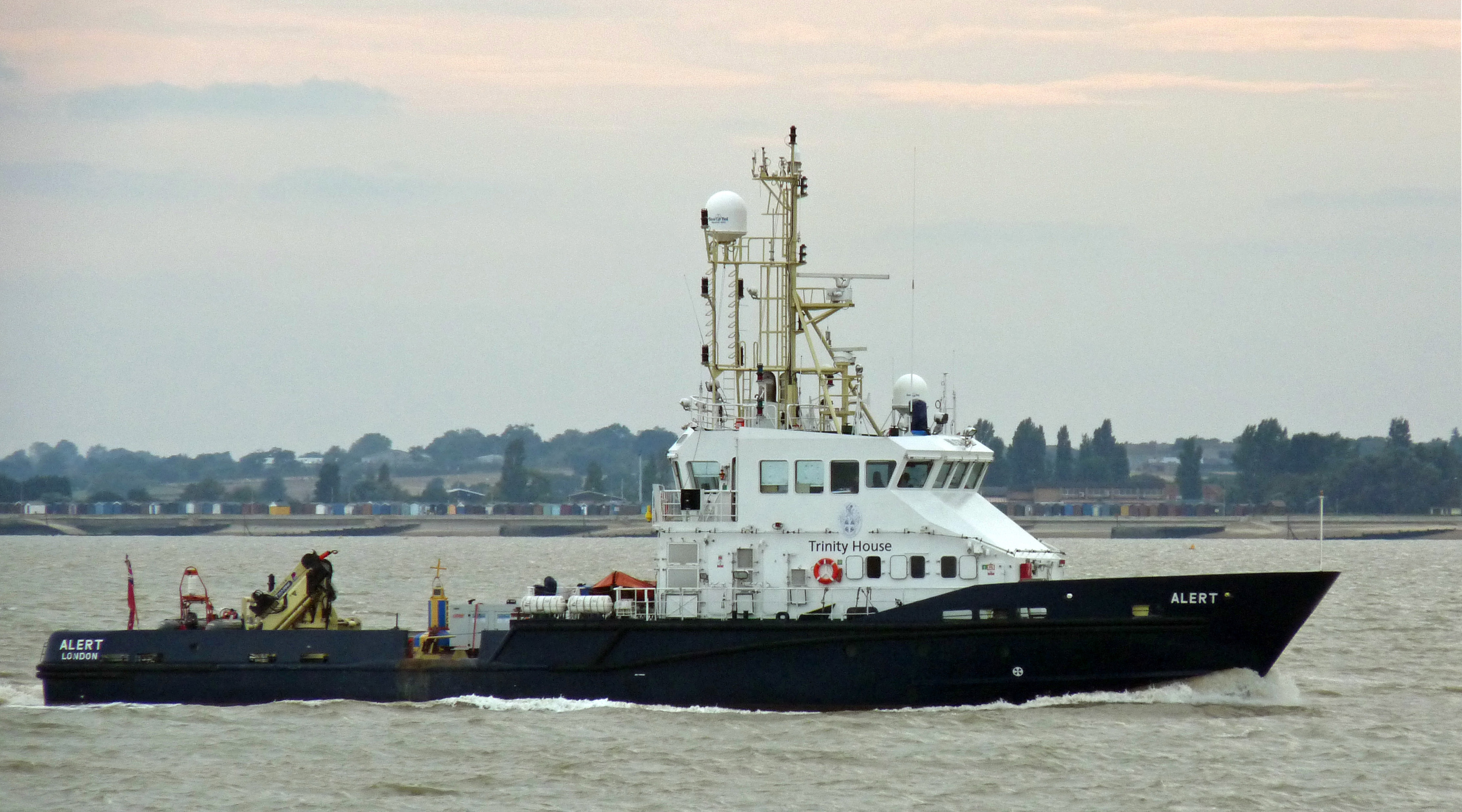
THV Alert entering Harwich Harbour on 6 September 2009

- THV Alert (2006) is a 39.3-metre (129 ft) Rapid Intervention Vessel, able to respond rapidly to maritime incidents off the southeast coast of England. She is capable of buoy handling, wreck marking and towing. Fitted with multibeam and side-scan hydrographic surveying capability and DP1 dynamic positioning, Alert can be utilised as a research platform with a large working deck.
- THV Galatea (2007) is an 84-metre (276 ft) multi-functional tender with a helicopter-landing pad. Fitted with a range of high specification survey equipment and a 30-tonne capacity crane, azimuthing propellers, two 750 kW bow thrusters and DP2 dynamic positioning, Galatea replaced the 1987-built THV Mermaid.

In 2026, Trinity House awarded a contract to the specialist Norwegian shipbuilder VARD for the construction of two new multi-function ships to replace both Galatea and Patricia, as part of the "Future Afloat" fleet renewal. Both vessels are intended for delivery by the end of 2029.

==== Boats ====
The corporation operates a number of small boats, mostly functioning as tenders to Trinity House vessels as described in the section above. The historic right of Trinity House to escort the Sovereign when travelling by ship in territorial waters is still exercised on ceremonial occasions. On the River Thames and inland waterways the duty is carried out by the vessel designated Trinity House No 1 Boat, a name which designates any boat assigned to this duty; as of 2020 a tender of THV Galatea is used for such ceremonial duties. However, for the Thames Diamond Jubilee Pageant on 3 June 2012, this boat had the name "T.H. No 1 Boat" painted onto the bow (port and starboard) whilst carrying the Master (the Princess Royal) in the jubilee flotilla. On 8 November 2014, Trinity House entered a float for the annual Lord Mayor's Show in the City of London, consisting of a heavy low-loader lorry, with the Trinity House No 1 Boat mounted on the low-loader trailer as an exhibit.

=== Property ===
As a charitable body, the corporation has owned a number of properties for benevolent purposes, chief among them the estate at Newington in south London (now rebranded as Trinity Village) and almshouses at Deptford, Mile End, and Walmer; the last of these estates was built in 1958 and remains in use by the corporation today as one of two listed estates: one of predominantly residential buildings at Trinity Village in Borough, London; and a working farm, formerly Booth property, at Goxhill in Lincolnshire. The rents from these properties form a substantial part of the Corporation's income.

=== Other assets ===
Amongst other significant assets, Trinity House operates a helicopter capable of landing on lighthouse and ship landing pads. From May 2011 to November 2015, the aircraft in principal use was an MD Helicopters MD Explorer 902 owned by Police Aviation Services (PAS) and operated under lease. Since December 2015 a Eurocopter EC135 G-GLAA owned and operated by PDG Aviation Services has fulfilled the role.

== Ensign ==
The Ensign of Trinity House is a British Red Ensign defaced with the shield of the coat of arms (a St George's Cross with a sailing ship in each quarter). The Master and Deputy Master each have their own differenced flags.

When escorting the Sovereign, Trinity House vessels may fly the White Ensign.

Banner (pre-1937)

Ensign (pre-1937)

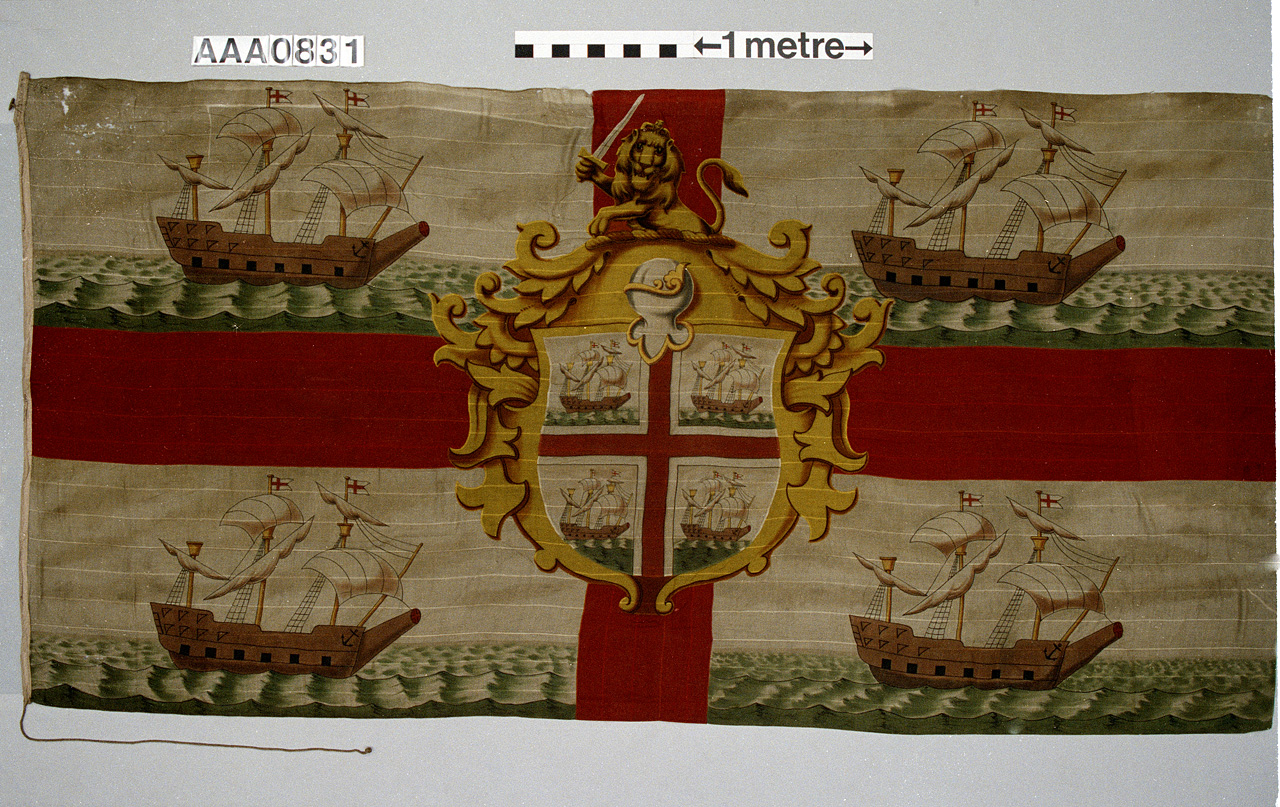
Master's Flag (1901–37)

Banner (1937–present)

Ensign (1937–present)

== See also ==
- HM Coastguard
- Northern Lighthouse Board
- Commissioners of Irish Lights
- IALA – The International Association of Lighthouse Authorities
- List of oldest companies
- Two other institutions, with a similar history and longevity, are licensed for the examination and licensing of deep-sea pilots in England:
  - Hull Trinity House
  - Newcastle-upon-Tyne Trinity House
- Trinity House National Lighthouse Museum
- National Coastwatch Institution voluntary organisation covering England and Wales
- Lightvessels in the United Kingdom

== Bibliography ==
- The Corporation of the Hull Trinity House, established 1369.
- The Newcastle Trinity House.
- europilots.org.uk
- "A fortnight in Egypt at the opening of the Suez Canal" London : Smith and Ebbs, 1869. Written by Captain Sir Frederick Arrow [Deputy Master of Trinity House]
