= General lighthouse authority =

Three agencies in the British Isles

A general lighthouse authority (GLA) is one of three agencies primarily responsible for aids to navigation in the United Kingdom and the Republic of Ireland. They are divided into regions as follows:

- Trinity House: England & Wales, Channel Islands and Gibraltar
- Northern Lighthouse Board: Scotland and the Isle of Man
- Commissioners of Irish Lights (the C.I.L.): the whole of Ireland

A local lighthouse authority (LLA) is a port, harbour, or other party providing navigational aids in a locality as part of its facilities. These local authorities subscribe to the general lighthouse authority's policy on the correct maintenance and provision of such equipment.

Funding for the three GLAs is primarily collected through light dues, which are pooled in the General Lighthouse Fund and dispersed to the three authorities. The Irish Government also makes a contribution to the GLF.

The powers of Trinity House and the Northern Lighthouse Board are currently established in the Merchant Shipping Act 1995. These include the inspection of aids to navigation provided by local lighthouse authorities, and the levying of light dues on vessels to fund their work. The Dublin Port Act 1867 (30 & 31 Vict. c. lxxxi) established the Commissioners of Irish Lights, as successor to the Irish Lights Department of the Corporation for Preserving and Improving the Port of Dublin, as the agency responsible for all Irish coastal lights.

== See also ==
- Imperial Lighthouse Service
