= Merchant Navy Medal for Meritorious Service =

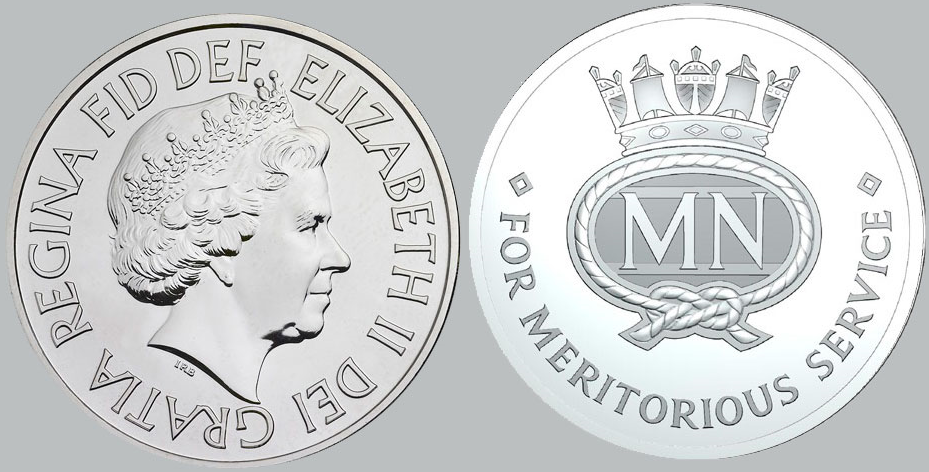
- Obverse and reverse of the medal
- Type: Service medal
- Awarded for: Meritorious service
- Description: Silver, 36mm in diameter
- Presented by: the United Kingdom of Great Britain and Northern Ireland
- Eligibility: Members of the Merchant Navy
- Post-nominals: Nil
- Status: Currently awarded
- Established: 2015
- First award: 2016
- Ribbon bar

Order of Wear
- Next (higher): Jersey Honorary Police Long Service and Good Conduct Medal
- Next (lower): Ebola Medal for Service in West Africa

The Merchant Navy Medal for Meritorious Service is a state award within the British honours system. The medal is awarded to no more than 20 recipients annually who are announced on Merchant Navy Day, 3 September. A 'Merchant Navy Medal' with the same criteria was awarded by the Merchant Navy Welfare Board from 2005, before being superseded by the state award in 2015.

== Criteria ==
The medal may be awarded to those individuals who are serving, or have served, in the Merchant Navy or the fishing fleets of the United Kingdom, the Isle of Man, and the Channel Islands. Recipients must have shown particularly valuable devotion to duty and exemplary service so as to serve as an outstanding example to others. Recipients will typically have given 20 years of good conduct and exemplary service, although awards have also been made for brave conduct. Annually, no more than 20 medals are awarded. Recipients are entitled to use the post-nominal letters of MNM.

== Appearance ==
The medal is 1.4 inches (36 mm) in diameter and struck in silver. The obverse bears the Ian Rank-Broadley effigy of Her Majesty The Queen. The reverse depicts the badge of the Merchant Navy: the letters MN surrounded by a rope joined at the base by a reef knot, a naval crown surmounts the rope, with the inscription 'FOR MERITORIOUS SERVICE'. The medal hangs from a ring suspension, with the 1.25 inches (32 mm) wide ribbon made up of equal stripes of green at the edges, white in the centre, with red bordering the white stripe which represent marine navigational lights. The name of the recipient is impressed on the rim of the Medal.

The previous Merchant Navy Medal displayed a portrait of Lord Nelson on the obverse with the Merchant Navy logo on the reverse. As it was not an official state award, it could not be worn in uniform alongside official medals.

== Notable recipients ==
- Captain Richard Woodman, LVO.
- Captain Belinda Bennett.
- Captain Ian McNaught, KCVO.
