= Monkwearmouth Academy =

Location
- Torver Crescent; Sunderland, Tyne and Wear, SR6 8LG; England
- Coordinates: 54.93709°N 1.38613°W

Information
- Type: Academy
- Motto: Growing Wisdom
- Trust: The Wearmouth Learning Trust
- Ofsted: Reports
- Chair: John Cogdon
- Head teacher: Andre Szpak
- Gender: Mixed
- Age: 11 to 16
- Website: www.monkwearmouth.sunderland.sch.uk

Monkwearmouth Academy is a state secondary school in Sunderland, Tyne and Wear, England, for pupils aged between 11 and 16. The most recent inspection report was in October 2013 and resulted in a judgement of good in all four aspects of the inspection.

== Extra curricular activities ==
Monkwearmouth Academy offers different extra curricular activities for the students such as FILMCLUB and the student news production club, White Badger News, as well as opportunities to be on the School Council, which made various improvements to the school including refurbishment of the toilets. The school also participates in the Duke of Edinburgh's Award Scheme.

== Location ==
The school is located in Sunderland in Tyne and Wear. The catchment area is Seaburn and the surrounding area. The site has various facilities including a swimming pool and well-resourced faculty areas.

== Notable pupils ==
- Terry Deary, author best known for writing the Horrible Histories series
- Melanie Hill, actor
- John Robertson, Paralympian
- Ian McNaught, Merchant Navy Captain
- Jill Scott, footballer who won UEFA Women's Euro 2022
- Martin Smith, former footballer who made 119 league appearances for Sunderland
