= Prison Services (Operational Duties) Long Service and Good Conduct Medal =

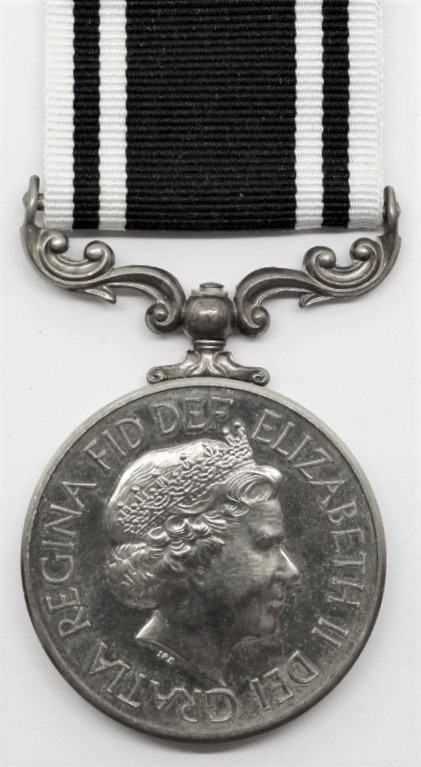
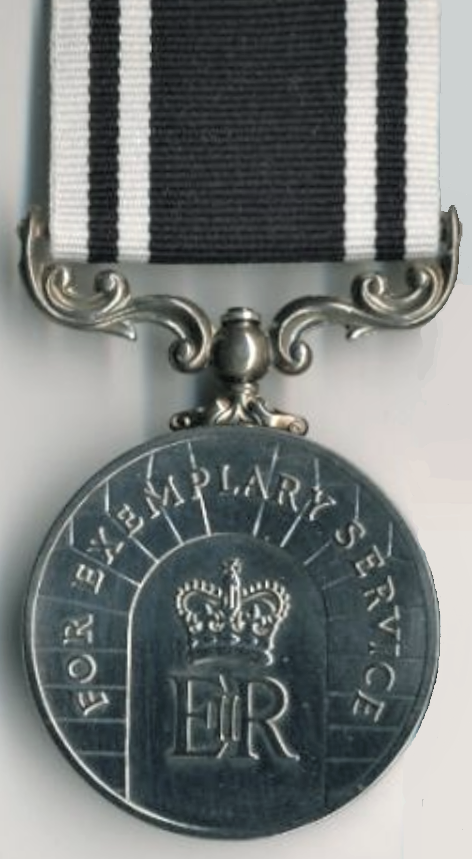
- Obverse and reverse of the medal
- Type: Long service medal
- Awarded for: 20 years operational service
- Presented by: the United Kingdom
- Eligibility: Members of His Majesty's Prison Service, the Northern Ireland Prison Service, Scottish Prison Service, and the prisons on Guernsey, Jersey, and the Isle of Man.
- Established: 17 December 2010
- Ribbon bar of the medal

Order of Wear
- Next (higher): Royal Fleet Auxiliary Service Medal
- Next (lower): Rhodesia Medal

The Prison Services (Operational Duties) Long Service and Good Conduct Medal was established by Royal Warrant on 17 December 2010. The medal is awarded for long service to members of the various prison services of the United Kingdom.

== Criteria ==
To qualify for the medal, a recipient must have served on operational prison duties for twenty years. This service can be either continuous or aggregated, and can include both full and part-time service. Those who move to non-operational Prison Service duties due to injury can also receive the medal after a total of twenty years service. There is no provision for ribbon clasps to recognise further periods of service.

Prison officers with a minimum of 25 years service were previously eligible for the Imperial Service Medal on retirement. As they cover the same service, the introduction of the Prison Services Medal meant that operational prison staff ceased to be eligible for the Imperial Service Medal.

There is currently a challenge being mounted to standardise the criteria of the Prison Service LSGC to have parity of esteem with the new Border Force and Immigration Enforcement eligibility criteria and to a lesser degree the National Crime Agency in that service from the police, other Law Enforcement Agencies and Armed Forces will be aggregated to the twenty year service time. The Honours and Awards secretariat state that aggregation was only allowed for the NCA and BF+IE LSGC as they were formed in 2012 and 2013 and thus no personnel would qualify until 2032 and 2033 respectively. That said, the warrants for both are so wide and open to interpretation that new personnel transferring into these services will still aggregate their service at the expense of the other civilian services. There is no stated requirement to serve 20yrs for the BF+IE LSGC.

== Appearance ==
The Prison Services (Operational Duties) Long Service and Good Conduct Medal is circular, 1.4 inches (36 mm) in diameter, and made of cupro-nickel. The obverse, designed by Ian Rank-Broadley, bears an effigy of Queen Elizabeth II with the wording ELIZABETH II DEI GRATIA REGINA FID DEF. The reverse depicts a prison doorway with a crowned Royal Cypher. Above the design is the inscription FOR EXEMPLARY SERVICE. The name and details of the recipient are impressed on the rim of the medal.

The medal has an ornate scrolled suspension, the 1.25 inches (32 mm) wide ribbon being black with two narrow white stripes at each edge.
