= Imperial Service Medal =

British award for civil servants

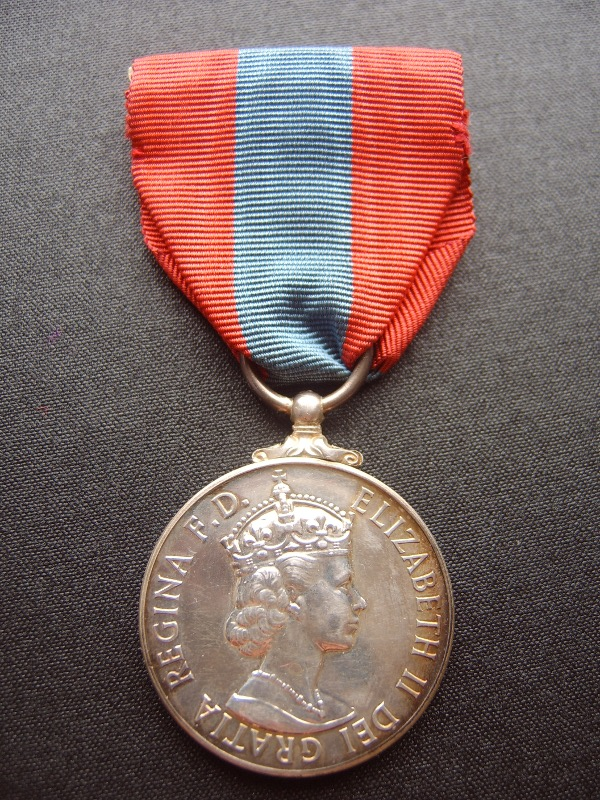
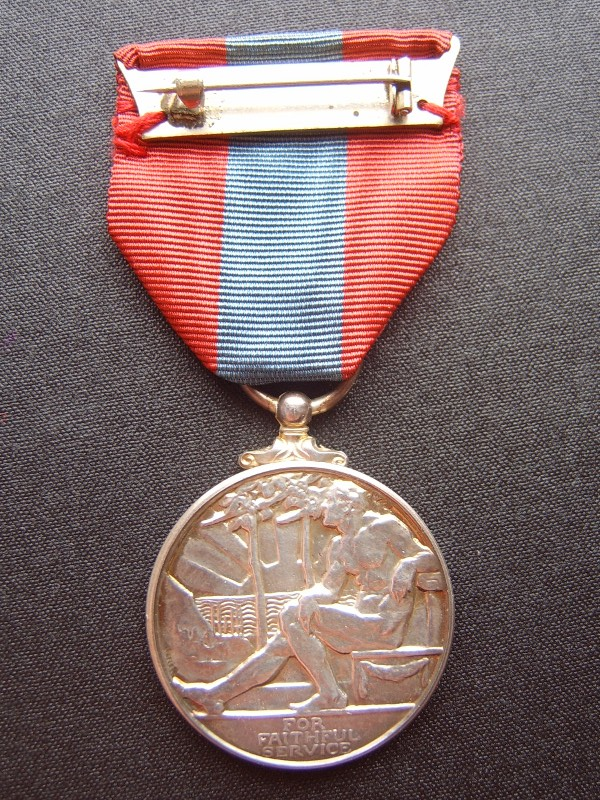
- Obverse and reverse of the medal
- Awarded for: 25 years of meritorious service
- Presented by: Charles III
- Eligibility: Civil Servants of the United Kingdom, the Dominions, Colonies, Protectorates, and Overseas Territories.
- Established: 8 August 1902
- Ribbon bar of the medal

Order of Wear
- Next (higher): Polar Medal
- Next (lower): Indian Police Medal

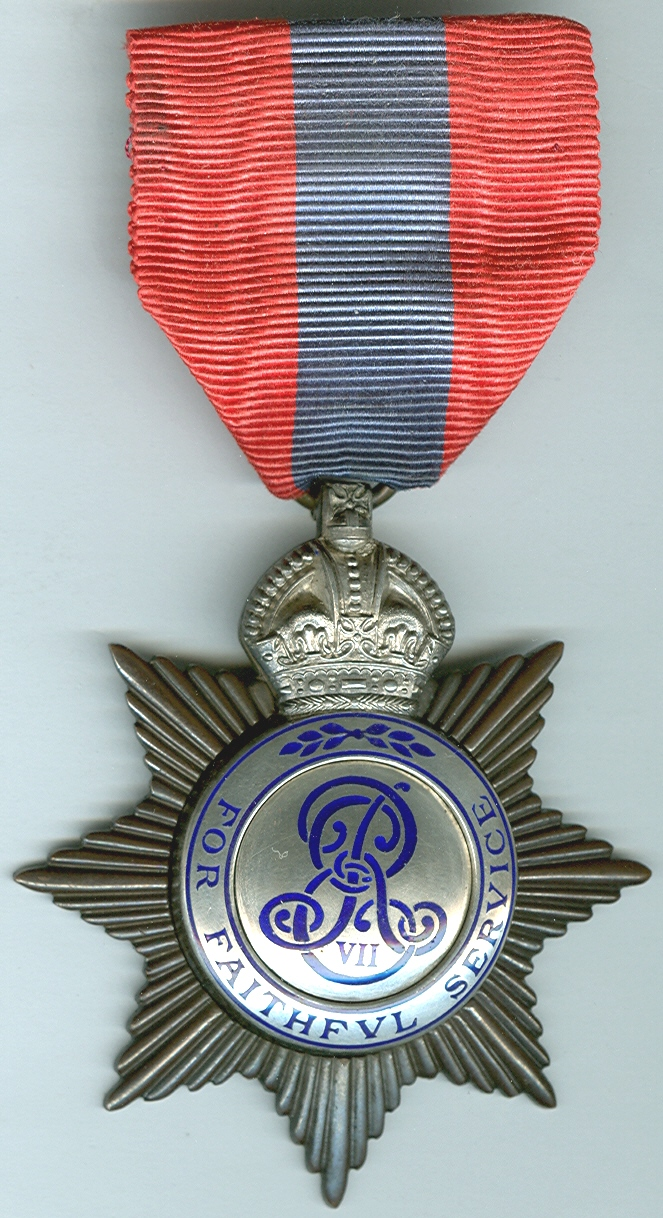
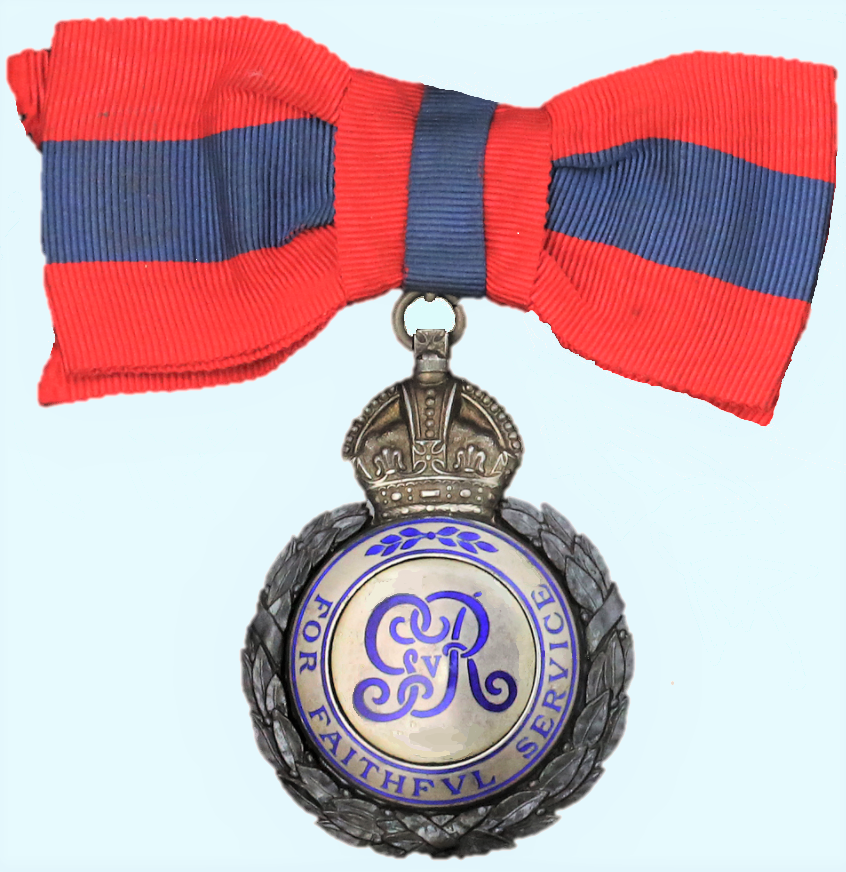
Original design, Gentlemen's and ladies' issues

The Imperial Service Medal is a medal affiliated with the Imperial Service Order. The medal was established under the statutes of the Imperial Service Order, on 8 August 1902, by King Edward VII, with the first awards appearing in the London Gazette in May 1903.

== Eligibility ==
It is presented upon retirement to selected civil servants, including those belonging to the lowest support and clerical branches, who complete at least 25 years' meritorious service. It is primarily an award to manual and industrial grades, including workers in HM Dockyards and, prior to 1969 when it moved from central government control, the Post Office. Prison officers were eligible prior to the establishment in 2010 of the Prison Services Long Service Medal. The minimum period of service was 20½ years in India prior to independence in 1947, and 16 years in unhealthy climates in other countries.

== Appearance ==
When originally created the Imperial Service Medal was a seven-pointed star, or a laurel wreath for women, in the same pattern as the Imperial Service Order, but with the star or laurel in bronze. In 1920 an amendment of the statutes changed the appearance of the medal to its current form: a circular silver medal, 32 mm (1.3 in) in diameter, bearing the effigy of the reigning sovereign on the obverse. To date, here have been six versions:

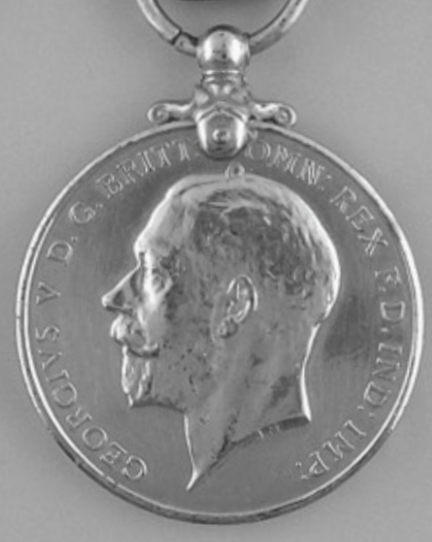
George V, 1920-30. Inscribed GEORGIVS V D. G. BRITT: OMN: REX F. D. INDIAE. IMP.

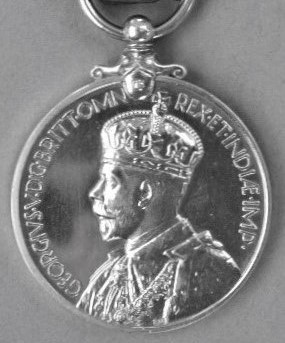
George V, crowned head 1931-37. Inscribed GEORGIVS VI DEI. GRA. BRITT. OMN REX. FID. DEF.

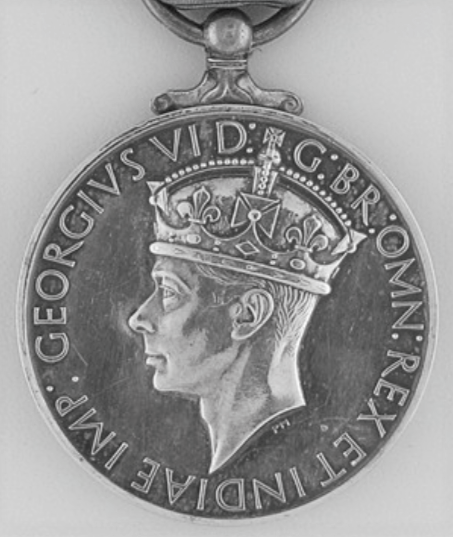
George VI, 1937-48. Inscribed GEORGIVS VI D: G: BR: OMN: REX ET INDIAE IMP:

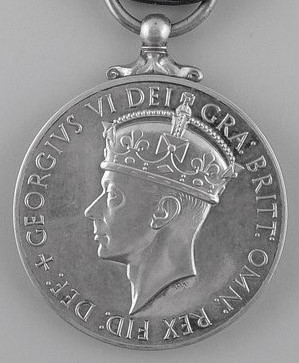
George VI, 1949-53. Inscribed GEORGIVS VI DEI: GRA: BRITT: OMN: REX FID: DEF:

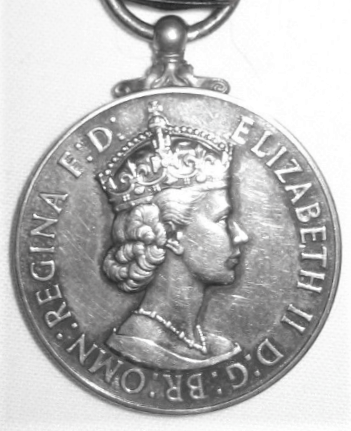
Elizabeth II, 1953-54. Inscribed ELIZABETH II D: G: BR: OMN: REGINA F.D.

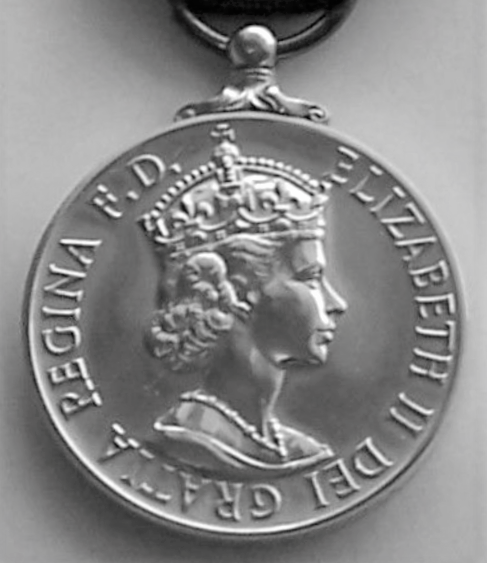
Elizabeth II, 1954-2022. Inscribed ELIZABETH II DEI GRATIA REGINA F.D.

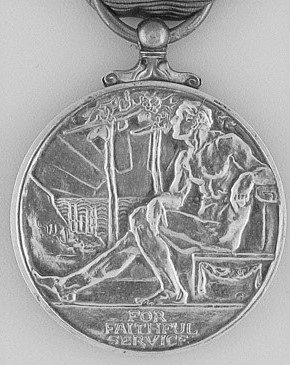
Common reverse, all issues since 1920.

The reverse bears the image of a naked man resting from his labours with the inscription "For Faithful Service". The name of the recipient is impressed on the rim of the medal. Recipients are listed in the London Gazette.
