= Light dues =

Levy on ships for maintaining lighthouses

Light dues are the charges levied on ships for the maintenance of lighthouses and other aids to navigation.

== British Isles ==
Light dues are levied on commercial vessels and larger pleasure boats calling at ports in the British Isles and paid into the General Lighthouse Fund (GLF), which is under the stewardship of the UK's Department for Transport and is used to finance the lighthouse services provided by the three general lighthouse authorities that cover all of the British Isles:

- Trinity House for England, Wales, Gibraltar and the Channel Islands
- Northern Lighthouse Board for Scotland and the Isle of Man
- Commissioners of Irish Lights for the Republic of Ireland and Northern Ireland

The main principles of the light dues system are:

- The UK Department for Transport sets the level of light dues in the UK, which is reviewed annually, taking advice from the General Lighthouse Authorities and representatives of the shipping industry. The Irish Department of Transport, Tourism and Sport sets the level of light dues in the Republic of Ireland.
- In most cases, the rate charged is based on the net tonnage of the vessel. The current rate is 46 pence per tonne, capped at a maximum of £23,000 for vessels weighing 50,000 tonnes or more.
- A vessel pays light dues when it first calls at a port in the UK or Ireland; thereafter it is exempt from further payments for one month. Each vessel is charged for a maximum of nine voyages per annum.
- Vessels calling in the UK and Republic of Ireland are required to pay the rate applicable at the port where they are first liable to pay light dues. The nine voyage cap applies regardless of whether the port calls are in the UK or Ireland.
- Tugs and fishing vessels (of 10 metres; 33' in length or more) make an annual payment based on the registered length of the vessel. Pleasure boats (of 20 tons or more) make a monthly payment up to an annual maximum.

Increasing automation of aids to navigation in the British Isles enabled the rate of light dues to fall in real terms in the 90's and early 2000's. In 2010, with the rate at 41p, the UK Government announced that there would be no further increases for at least the next three years. The rate was then cut by one penny in each of 2014, 2015 and 2016, with a further half penny in 2017 to reach 37.5p. In 2021 the rate was increased to 38.5p, in part, to counter the impact of reduced income during the COVID19 pandemic. In 2022 the rate was increased to 41p; in 2023, it was increased to 45p; in 2026, it was increased to its current value of 46p, with a note announcing a further increase to 47p in 2027.

In 2010, the UK Government announced it had reached agreement with the Irish Government that aids to navigation off the coast of the Republic of Ireland would be wholly funded from Irish domestic sources there by 2015–16. Changes to the way light dues payments are enforced in the UK and Ireland were implemented from 1 April 2015 to give effect to this agreement.
