= Nathaniel Drinkwater =

Nathaniel Drinkwater is a fictional character and the protagonist of a series of historical fiction novels by English author Richard Woodman. In the series, Drinkwater is an officer in the British Royal Navy during the Napoleonic Wars.

== Life ==
According to Woodman, Drinkwater was born on 28 October 1762 to a relatively poor family. His naval career started in 1779 with his appointment to frigate HMS Cyclops as a midshipman under Captain Hope, where he encountered his long-standing adversary Augustus Morris (then a senior midshipman), friend Richard White (then a junior midshipman) and patron Lord Dungarth (then First Lieutenant) while fighting in the American War of Independence. After initial success as prizemaster of the American privateer Algonquin, passing as master's mate, and a period as Acting Lieutenant, Drinkwater survived the sinking of HMS Royal George but lost his chance of a commission as a result of Admiral Kempenfelt's death, instead providentially finding employment as a mate on Trinity House yachts. Subsequently re-employed as a master's mate, he found himself serving in HMS Kestrel, a cutter on special service in the English Channel, where he first encountered Hortense Santonax nee Montholon, who haunted his imagination for decades thereafter, and with whose husband Eduard Santhonax, a talented and ruthless Bonapartist naval officer, he found himself recurrently in conflict over the following years. His commission as Lieutenant was confirmed by Admiral Duncan following Kestrel's action with a French yacht on the periphery of the Battle of Camperdown in 1797.

Moving with Kestrel's irascible Welsh captain Madoc Griffiths to the brig HMS Hellebore, Drinkwater was sent to the Red Sea by Admiral Lord Nelson, only to lose Hellebore on Daedalus Reef but gain the French frigate Antigone in a cutting out operation. Deprived of his proposed command of Antigone in favour of Lieutenant Augustus Morris, Drinkwater survived an encounter with a better-armed French frigate and Morris was removed from command. Drinkwater was given command of bomb vessel tender HMS Virago as part of the British expedition to Copenhagen to neutralise the Danish fleet, and managed to attract the support of both Admirals Parker and Nelson as a result of his assistance in surveying the battleground. He was severely wounded by shell splinters during Nelson's bombardment of Boulogne but was then appointed by Lord St Vincent as Acting Captain of the corvette HMS Melusine, whose captain had been fatally wounded in a duel. Melusine escorted whalers to the Arctic on what initially seemed an idyllic cruise, but encountered a French privateer, Requin, with whom two of the whaler captains were in league, resulting in a bloody battle in which Drinkwater killed treacherous whaler captain Ellerby.

== The Nathaniel Drinkwater novels ==
The novels, in chronological order, are:

1. An Eye of the Fleet
2. A King's Cutter
3. A Brig of War
4. The Bomb Vessel
5. The Corvette
6. 1805
7. Baltic Mission
8. In Distant Waters
9. A Private Revenge
10. Under False Colours
11. The Flying Squadron
12. Beneath the Aurora
13. The Shadow of the Eagle
14. Ebb Tide
