= Border Force and Immigration Enforcement Long Service and Good Conduct Medal =

- Medal Ribbon of the UK BF&IE LSGC
- Type: Long Service medal
- Awarded for: At least 20 years' service
- Presented by: the United Kingdom
- Eligibility: Members of Border Force and Immigration Enforcement
- Established: 2022

The Border Force and Immigration Enforcement Long Service and Good Conduct Medal (BF&IE LS&GCM) is a medal created to honour the service of members of the UK Border Force and Immigration Enforcement agencies, within the Home Office. It was established in 2022 and first awarded in 2024.

== Criteria ==
The Border Force and Immigration Enforcement Long Service and Good Conduct Medal is awarded to all colleagues of the Border Force (BF) and Immigration Enforcement (IE) who attain 20 years aggregated law enforcement service within these agencies. Clasps can be awarded for every period of 10 years qualifying service post initial award of the medal.

Service within the BF and IE precursor agencies can also be taken into account, in a case-by-case basis. These agencies include the UK Armed Forces, UK Police Forces, and the following:

- The Border and Immigration Agency
- UK Border Agency
- HM Revenue and Customs
- UK Visas and Immigration

== Description ==
The medal is circular and made of silver coloured metal. The obverse bears the Crowned Effigy of King Charles III, surrounded by the royal titles. The reverse depicts the badge of the Home Office below the words FOR EXEMPLARY SERVICE, surmounting emblems of laurel. The ribbon of the medal contains a central white band, surrounded by symmetrical bands of blue, purple, and yellow.
