= HMS Pilot =

Four ships of the Royal Navy have borne the name HMS Pilot, or HMS Pilote:

- HMS Pilote (1779) was a 14-gun brig-sloop, formerly the French Mutin-class cutter Pilote. Pilote was launched November 1778 at Dunkirk; the Admiralty sold her in May 1799.
- HMS Pilot (1807) was an 18-gun Cruizer-class brig-sloop launched in 1807 and sold in 1828. She became a whaler, making five whale fishing voyages between 1830 and 1842; she was last listed in 1844.
- HMS Pilot (1838) was a 16-gun brig-sloop launched in 1838 and sold in 1862.
- HMS Pilot (1879) was an 8-gun training brig launched in 1879 and sold in 1907.
