= Richard Woodman =

English novelist and naval historian (1944–2024)

Captain Richard Woodman LVO MNM
- Born: Richard Martin Woodman; 10 March 1944; London, England
- Died: 2 October 2024 (aged 80)
- Occupations: Merchant navy officer, novelist and naval historian
- Spouse: Christine Hite (m. 1969)
- Children: 2
- Writing career
- Genres: Naval fiction, historical fiction, maritime history
- Notable works: Nathaniel Drinkwater series A History of the British Merchant Navy
- Notable awards: Desmond Wettern Maritime Media Award (2001); Anderson Medal (2005); Thomas Gray Medal (2010)

Captain Richard Martin Woodman LVO MNM (10 March 1944 – 2 October 2024) was an English merchant navy officer, novelist and naval historian. Woodman served at sea mainly working for Trinity House and retired in 1997 from a 37-year nautical career, to write full-time. He published a series of fictional stories, as well as researching and writing several non-fictional historical books on maritime topics. Woodman published over 70 books, including historical studies, novels and novellas.

== Biography ==
Woodman was born in London, England on 10 March 1944, to Douglas and Rosalie Woodman. His father worked in both local government and police administration. When he was young, Woodman was a member of the Sea Scouts and took part in the 1960 Tall Ships race. In 1960, Woodman failed all but two of his O-level studies at school but was accepted as an indentured apprentice for Blue Funnel Line. He remained at sea, progressing his sea certification until reaching the level of master mariner. His experience ranged from cargo-liners to ocean weather ships (including former Flower-class corvettes and specialist support vessels as well as yachts, square-riggers, and trawlers. He began writing at sea and is said to have once joked that his typewriter was once thrown across his cabin by the movement of the ship at sea but that his publisher was understanding.

Woodman would go on to work for the Ocean Weather Service before working at sea for Trinity House, looked after buoys, lights and other navigational marks. In 1969, he married Christine Hite and spent most of his life living in Harwich near the main marine facility of Trinity House. They had two children, Abigail and Edward. He was promoted to First Officer with Trinity House in 1974. In one of his final seagoing roles, he served as captain of THV Patricia having been promoted to command her when she was commissioned in 1982. He then spent a period working ashore as marine superintendent for Trinity House. Richard Woodman died from cancer on 2 October 2024, at the age of 80.

== Writing ==
His main work is 14 novels published between 1981 and 1998 about the career of Nathaniel Drinkwater, a Royal Navy officer during the era of the Napoleonic Wars. Woodman also wrote shorter series about James Dunbar and William Kite, but he also has written a range of factual books about 18th century and WW2 history. These include a trilogy of studies of convoys in the Second World War and a five volume history of the British Merchant Navy. Unlike many other modern naval historical novelists, such as C.S. Forester or Patrick O'Brian, he has served afloat, as he went to sea at the age of sixteen as an indentured midshipman and had spent eleven years in command.

His most significant non-fiction works were a five-volume A History of the British Merchant Navy and a three-volume account of major Second World War Arctic, Mediterranean and North Atlantic convoys.

Woodman was a regular correspondent for the shipping newspaper Lloyd's List and continued his close association with the sea as a keen yachtsman. He also served on the Corporate Board of Trinity House. He won several awards including the Society for Nautical Research's Anderson Medal in 2005 and the Marine Society's Harmer Award in 1978.

== Honours ==
Woodman was appointed Lieutenant of the Royal Victorian Order (LVO) in the 2014 New Year Honours for his services to Trinity House. He was a recipient of the Merchant Navy Medal.

Woodman was appointed a Younger Brethren of Trinity House in 2000 and then appointed as an Elder Brethren of Trinity House in 2006.

Woodman won the Desmond Wettern Maritime Media Award in 2001 and the Society for Nautical Research's Anderson Medal in 2005 for three major studies of convoy operations in the Second World War. He was awarded the Marine Society's Thomas Gray Medal in 2010 for his five-volume history of the British Merchant Navy.

== Books ==
=== Nathaniel Drinkwater series ===
1. An Eye of the Fleet (1981)
2. A King's Cutter (1982)
3. A Brig of War (1983)
4. The Bomb Vessel (1984)
5. The Corvette (1985)
6. 1805 (1985)
7. Baltic Mission (1986)
8. In Distant Waters (1988)
9. A Private Revenge (1989)
10. Under False Colours (1991)
11. The Flying Squadron (1992)
12. Beneath the Aurora (1995)
13. The Shadow of the Eagle (1997)
14. Ebb Tide (1998)

=== William Kite trilogy ===
1. The Guineaman (2000)
2. The Privateersman (2000)
3. The East Indiaman (2001)

=== James Dunbar novels ===
1. Waterfront
2. Under Sail

=== Kit Faulkner novels ===
1. A Ship for the King
2. For King or Commonwealth
3. The King's Chameleon

=== Other fiction ===
- The Ice Mask
- Dead Man Talking
- Wager (1990)
- Endangered Species
- The Darkening Sea
- Voyage East or The Antigone
- The Accident
- Act of Terror
- Captain of the Caryatid
- The Cruise of the Commissioner
- "Decision at Trafalgar"

=== Non-fiction ===
- The Lighthouses of Trinity House (1983)
- The Sea Warriors
- The Victory of Seapower, 1806–1814
- Keepers of the Sea: The Yachts and Tenders of Trinity House
- A Brief History of Mutiny
- View from the Sea
- Arctic Convoys, 1941–1945 (1994)
- Malta Convoys Malta Convoys 1940–43
- The Real Cruel Sea, The Merchant Navy in the Battle of the Atlantic, 1939–1943
- The History of the Ship
- The Story of Sail (co-author)
- ...Of Daring Temper, The History of The Marine Society
- Cold War Command with Don Conley
- The Battle of the River Plate
- A History of the British Merchant Navy
1. Neptune's Trident: Spices and Slaves 1500–1807 (2008)
2. Britannia's Realm: In Support of the State 1763–1815 (2009)
3. Masters Under God: Makers of Empire 1817–1884 (2009)
4. More Days, More Dollars: The Universal Bucket Chain 1885–1920 (2010)
5. Fiddler's Green: The Great Squandering 1921–2012 (2010)
