= NLV Pole Star =

NLV Pole Star may refer to one of five lighthouse tender vessels operated by the Northern Lighthouse Board.

- NLV Pole Star (1892) - launched in 1892 at Fairfield Shipbuilding and Engineering Company, Govan, Scotland (renamed Orphir in 1931 to release Pole Star name for new build vessel)
- NLV Pole Star (1930) - launched in 1930 at William Beardmore and Company, Dalmuir, Scotland (renamed May IV in 1961 to release Pole Star name for new build vessel)
- NLV Pole Star (1892) - launched in 1961 at Caledon Shipbuilding & Engineering Company, Dundee, Scotland (sold in 1993 and renamed Rogue)
- NLV Pole Star (2000) - launched in 2000 at Ferguson Shipbuilders, Port Glasgow, Scotland (sold and renamed Kommandor Claire in May 2025 to release Pole Star name for new build vessel)
- NLV Pole Star (2025) - launched in 2025 at Astilleros Gondán, Castropol, Spain
