= Buoy tender =

Ship type

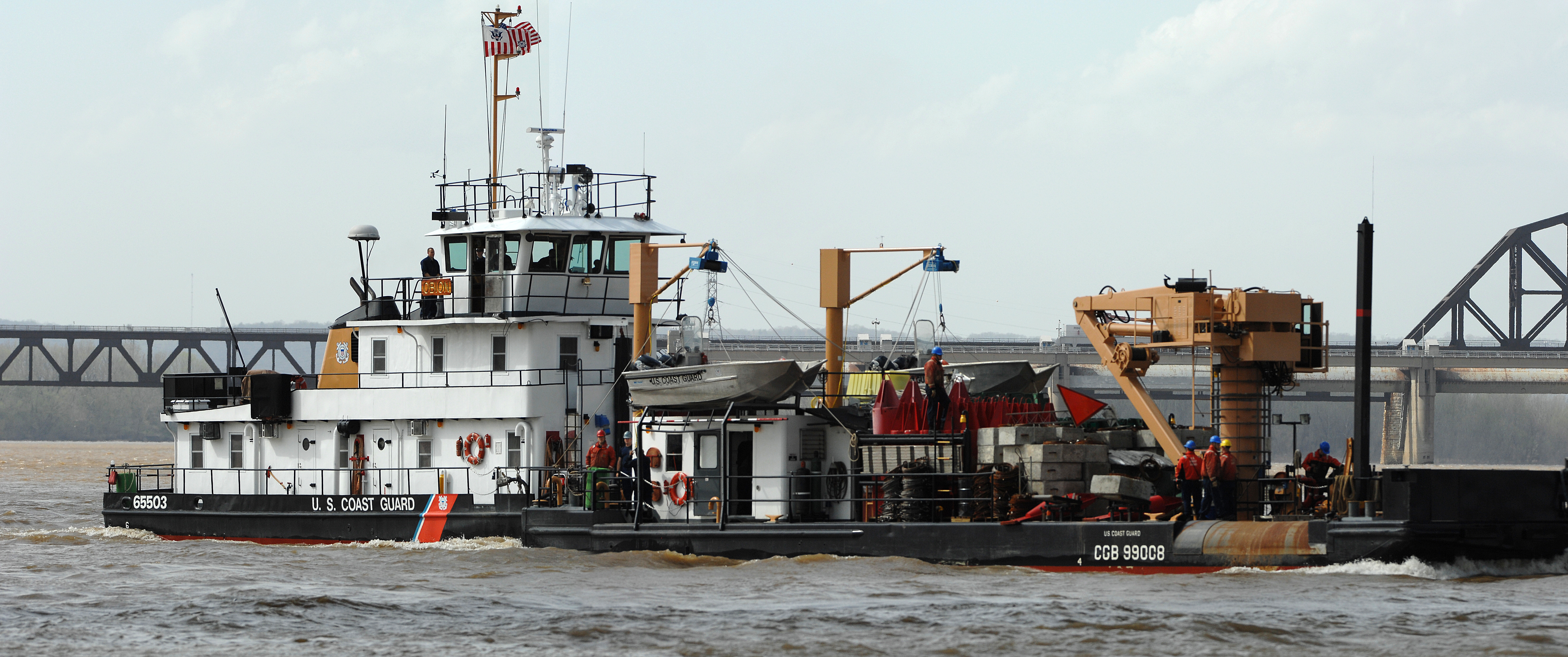
USCGC Obion, a river buoy tender, maintaining navigational buoys on the Ohio River at Louisville, Kentucky.

A buoy tender is a type of vessel used to maintain and replace navigational buoys. This term can also apply to an actual person who does this work.

The United States Coast Guard uses buoy tenders to accomplish one of its primary missions of maintaining all U.S. aids to navigation (ATON).

The Canadian Coast Guard uses multi-use vessels (most being icebreakers) with tasks including buoy tending.

== Types of coast guard buoy tenders ==
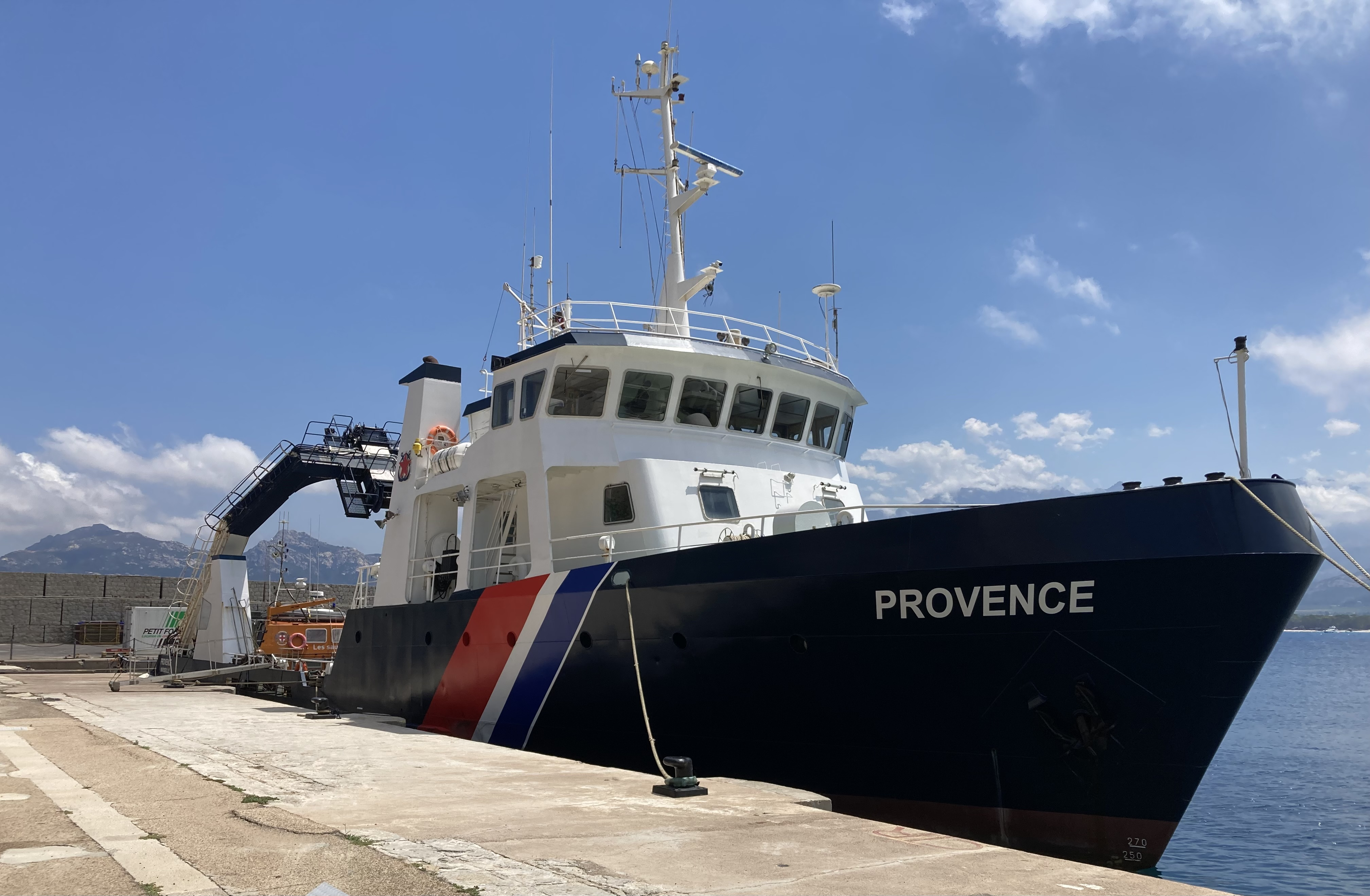
Maritime Gendarmerie buoy tender Provence

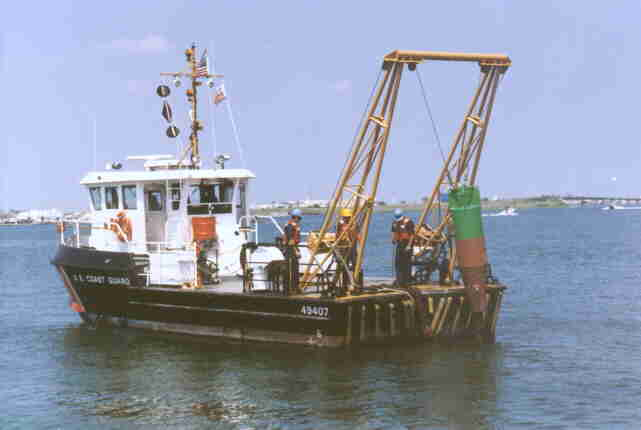
BUSL-49

United States Coast Guard

- 240' USCGC Mackinaw (WLBB-30)
- 225' USCG seagoing buoy tender (WLB)
- 175' USCG coastal buoy tender (WLM)
- 160' USCG inland construction tender (WLIC)
- 100' USCG inland buoy tender (WLI)
- 100' USCG inland construction tender (WLIC)
- 75' Gasconade-class river buoy tender (WLR)
- 75' USCG inland construction tender (WLIC)
- 65' Ouachita-class river buoy tender (WLR)
- 65' Inland buoy tender (WLI)
- 49' Buoy utility stern loading boat (BUSL)
- Other miscellaneous aids to navigation boats

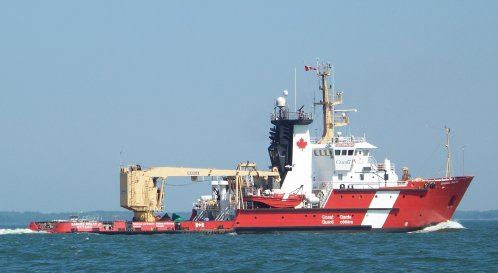
CCGS buoy tender Samuel Risley

Canadian Coast Guard

- 272' CCGS Ann Harvey
- 272' CCGS George R. Pearkes
- 228' CCGS Earl Grey
- 228' CCGS Samuel Risley
- 198' CCGS Alexander Henry
- 180' CGS Aberdeen
- 179' CCGS Simcoe
- 180' CGS Simcoe
- 144' CCGS C.P. Edwards
- 125' CCGS Brant
- 66' CCGS Cove Isle
- 222' CCGS Sir Wilfred Grenfell

== Other buoy tenders ==
Many coastal States have buoy tenders to maintain aids to navigation in and around their coastal waters. In the UK, this includes lighthouse authorities, including the Northern Lighthouse Board and Trinity House who ships maintain buoys as well as acting as lighthouse tenders.

- NLV Pharos, multi-function tender
- NLV Pole Star, medium buoy tender
- THV Galatea, multi-function tender
