= NLV Pole Star (2000) =

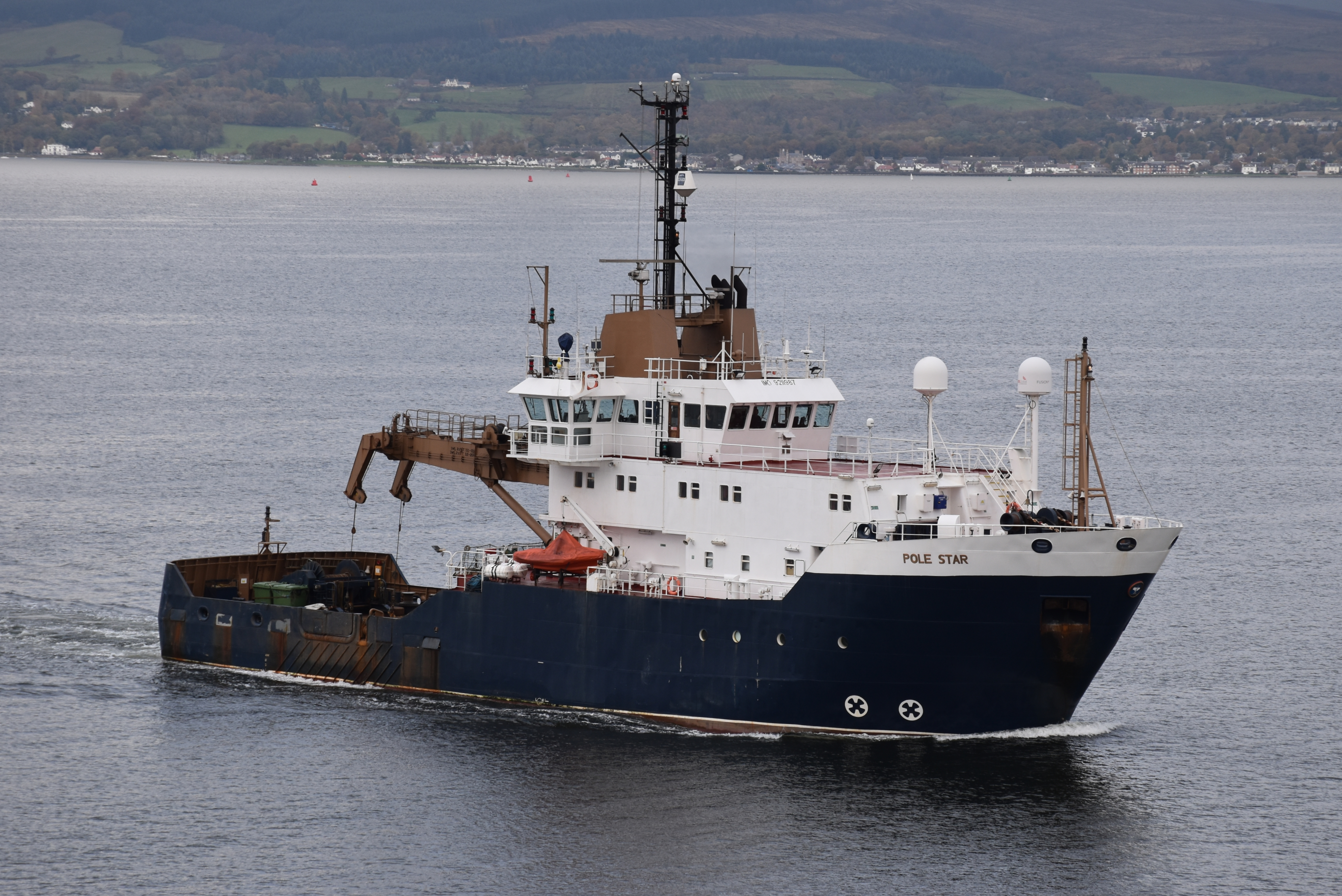
- The NLV Pole Star passing Greenock

History

United Kingdom
- Name: NLV Pole Star
- Operator: Northern Lighthouse Board
- Port of registry: Leith
- Builder: Ferguson Shipbuilders, Port Glasgow, Scotland
- Yard number: 709
- Laid down: 28 July 1999
- Completed: 15 September 2000
- Out of service: 21 May 2025
- Home port: Oban
- Identification: IMO number: 9211987; MMSI number: 235000500; Callsign: ZQQC5
- Status: Retired - Sold

General characteristics
- Class & type: Lloyd's + 100A1, LA, + LMC, UMS
- Type: Buoy / Lighthouse Vessel
- Tonnage: Gross Tonnage: 1373 Tonnes; NET (Registered): Tonnage 352 Tonnes
- Displacement: 1,174 tonnes
- Length: o/a: 51.52 m; B.P: 44.00 m
- Beam: 12 m
- Height: Air Draught 25 m
- Draught: 3.2 m
- Depth: to Upper Deck: 5.00 m
- Propulsion: Cummins-Wärtsilä CW8L170 - 3 × 920 kW AC Diesel-electric dynamic positioning system, 2 × azimuth thrusters, 2 × tunnel bow thrusters
- Speed: 12 knots
- Boats & landing craft carried: Workboat: Sea Rover 5.5 m
- Capacity: 15 × Single Berth Cabins, 2 × Twin Berth Cabins
- Complement: 6 × Officers, 9 × Ratings

NLV Pole Star was a lighthouse tender operated by the Northern Lighthouse Board (NLB), the body responsible for the operation of lighthouses and marine navigation aids around the coasts of Scotland and the Isle of Man. The ship was also referred to as the Pole Star IV.

Pole Star was joined by a new vessel, NLV Pharos in March 2007, which replaced the previous vessel of the same name. Although the headquarters of the NLB is in Edinburgh, both vessels were serviced by a workbase in Oban on the west coast. In 2025, the vessel was sold to private commercial owners and a new ship, also called Pole Star entered service with the NLB.

== History ==
Pole Star was completed in 2000 by Ferguson Shipbuilders on the River Clyde. She is the fourth NLB vessel to carry the name and replaced the 37-year-old MV Fingal. In memory of this vessel, Pole Star had a workboat onboard named Fingal.

In March 2012, the ship engaged in carrying out marine a Multibeam echosounder survey in the area of Shetland with the British Geological Survey on behalf of Marine Scotland.

In January 2013, the ship carried out a marine sampling survey and undertook penetration testing in Loch Linnhe.

In August 2016, the ship stayed at the port of Inverness.

In October 2020, the ship visit Rosyth Dockyard for repair, maintenance and safety checks.

In July 2022, the ship hosted a series of public access open days in Douglas Harbour on the Isle of Man.

In 2021, it was announced that the NLB are looking to replace the ship with a new vessel, as the current Pole Star approaches the end of its service life. In 2023, it was announced that steel had been cut at the Gondán Shipyard in Figuere for the construction of a replacement ship, to be named as the new Pole Star. The new Pole Star is expected to replace the existing ship in summer 2025.

In May 2025, the vessel was sold by the NLB to a private shipping company.

== Equipment ==
The ship served primarily as a buoy tender but also had an ancillary role in transport purposes as a lighthouse tender. However, it also had capability to undertake marine surveys with the use of its multibeam echo sounder. The ship has an 18t crane on her 90m² aft deck. The ship has Dynamic positioning capability.
