= Ben Woollacott =

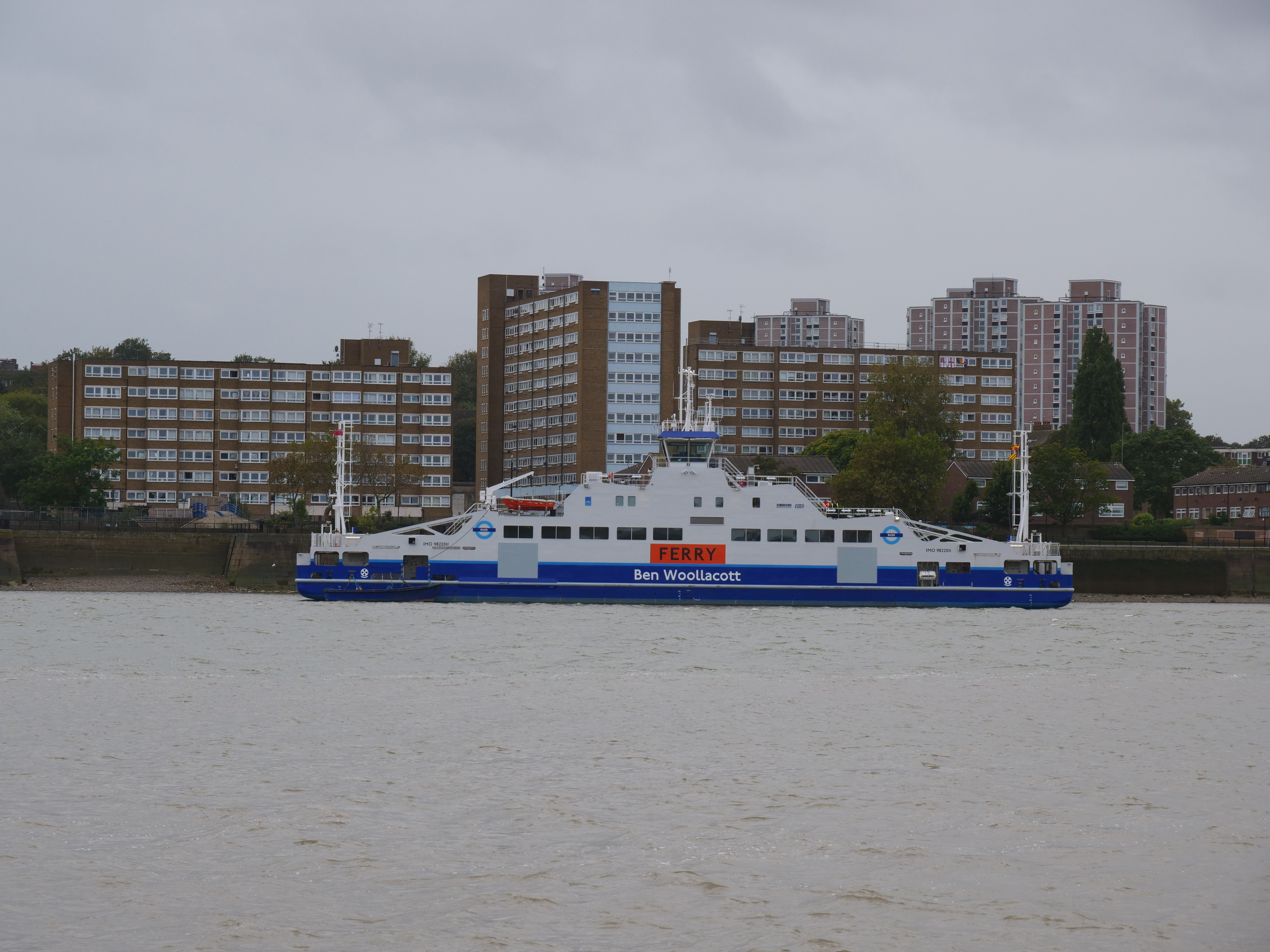
- Ben Woollacott moored a short distance upstream from the Woolwich Ferry termini in October 2019

History

United Kingdom
- Name: Ben Woollacott
- Port of registry: London, United Kingdom.
- Builder: Remontowa, Gdańsk
- Launched: 2018
- Identification: IMO number: 9822011; MMSI number: 232017796; Callsign:MDTW8

General characteristics
- Type: Passenger ship/Ro-Ro Cargo
- Tonnage: 1,750 GT
- Length: 60m
- Beam: 19m

Ben Woollacott is a ferry built by Remontowa, Poland that operates the Woolwich Ferry service in London, England. It was named after a teenage deckhand who drowned in an accident while untying mooring ropes of the ferry Ernest Bevin in 2011. Ben came from a family of River Thames watermen that had worked on the river for six generations.

It arrived in London on 15 November 2018. It has an automatic docking system to hold the ferry in place during loading. The vessel operates alongside sister ship Dame Vera Lynn. Both suffered from numerous technical issues resulting in closures and service reductions.

It was originally operated by Briggs Marine, before London River Services took over operation of the Woolwich Ferry service in December 2020.
