= Dame Vera Lynn (ship) =

Ferry in London

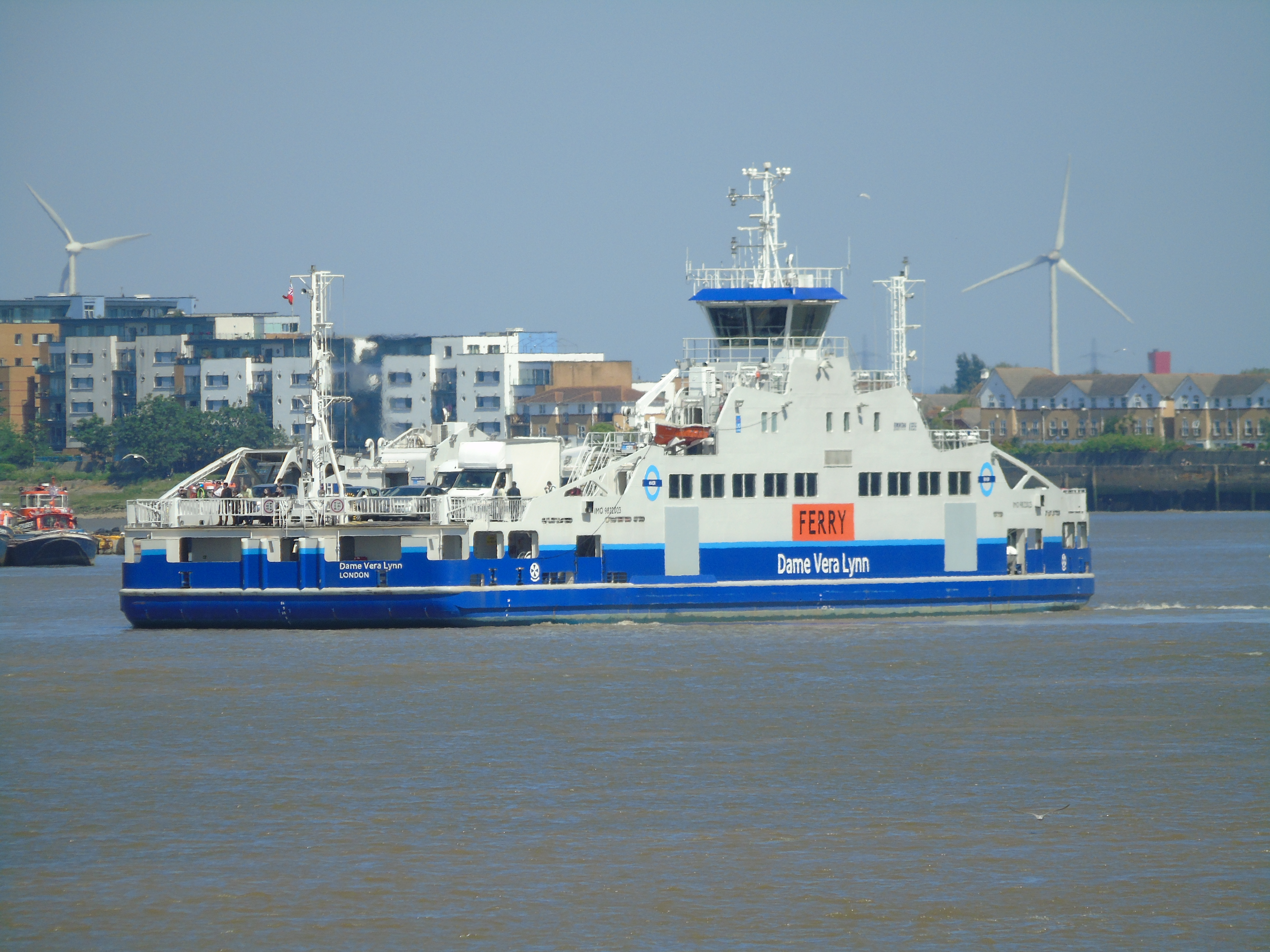
- Dame Vera Lynn operating the Woolwich Ferry service in 2021

History
- Name: Dame Vera Lynn
- Port of registry: London, United Kingdom
- Builder: Remontowa, Gdańsk
- Launched: 2018
- Identification: IMO number: 9822023; MMSI number: 232017797; Callsign: MDTW9

General characteristics
- Type: Passenger ship/Ro-ro cargo ship
- Length: 62 m (203 ft 5 in)
- Beam: 18.8 m (61 ft 8 in)

Dame Vera Lynn is a ferry built by Remontowa, Poland that operates the Woolwich Ferry service in London, England. It was named after the Vera Lynn whose songs became popular during the World War II. Dame Vera Lynn was born in East Ham and grew up not far from the ferry.

It arrived in London in 2018 to replace the existing ferries that had been in service since the 1960s. It has an automatic docking system to hold the ferry in place during loading, and is equipped with hybrid engines that allows it to run on electricity generated by motors.

In its first year of operation, it and its sister ship, the Ben Woollacott, suffered from numerous technical issues resulting in closures and service reductions.

It was originally operated by Briggs Marine, before London River Services took over operation of the Woolwich Ferry service in December 2020.
