= CCGS Simcoe =

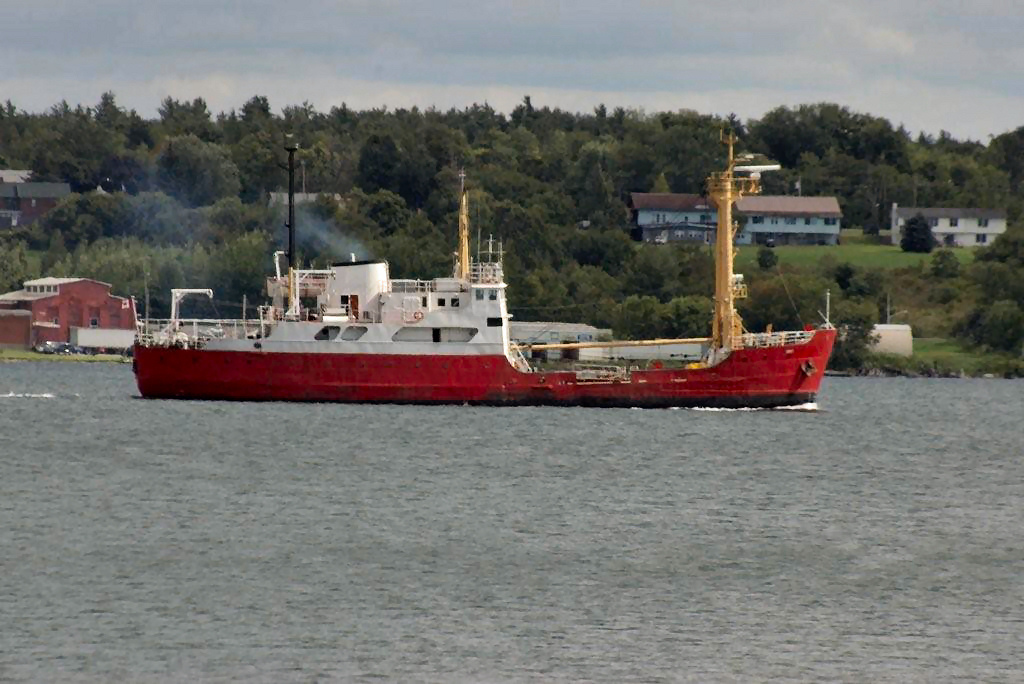
- Former CCGS Simcoe makes its way upstream on the St. Lawrence River en route to northern Georgian Bay.

History

Canada
- Name: Simcoe
- Namesake: John Graves Simcoe
- Operator: Canadian Coast Guard
- Port of registry: Ottawa, Ontario
- Builder: Canadian Vickers, Montreal
- Yard number: 279
- Commissioned: November 1962
- Decommissioned: 2007
- Refit: 1988
- Home port: Prescott, Ontario
- Identification: IMO number: 5328603
- Fate: Sold 2008

General characteristics
- Type: Buoy tender/light icebreaker
- Tonnage: 961 GRT; 368 NT
- Length: 54.6 m (179 ft 2 in)
- Beam: 11.6 m (38 ft 1 in)
- Draught: 3.8 m (12 ft 6 in)
- Propulsion: Diesel-electric
- Speed: 14 knots (26 km/h)
- Range: 5,000 nmi (9,300 km) at 10 knots (19 km/h)
- Endurance: 20 days
- Complement: 27

CCGS Simcoe (Note: CCGS stands for Canadian Coast Guard Ship) was a Canadian Coast Guard buoy tender and light icebreaker. The second vessel of the name in Canadian government service, Simcoe was in service from 1962 to 2007 based out of the Coast Guard base at Prescott, Ontario working the Great Lakes and Saint Lawrence Seaway. In 2008 the ship was sold to commercial interests.

== Design and description ==
Simcoe was an ice-strengthened buoy tender and light icebreaker, and was 54.6 m (179 ft 2 in) long overall with a beam of 11.6 m (38 ft 1 in) and a draught of 3.8 m (12 ft 6 in). The vessel had a gross register tonnage (GRT) of 961 and a 368 net tonnage (NT). Simcoe was propelled by a two fixed-pitch propellers driven by a diesel-electric system (DC/DC) comprising two Paxman 4SA 12-cylinder diesel engines driving two motors creating 2,000 shaft horsepower (1,500 kW). This gave the vessel a maximum speed of 14 knots (26 km/h). The ship could carry 156.00 m^{3} (34,320 imp gal) of diesel fuel, had a range of 5,000 nautical miles (9,300 km) at 10 knots (19 km/h) and could stay at sea for 20 days. The vessel had a complement of 27, composed of 10 officers and 17 crew.

== Service history ==
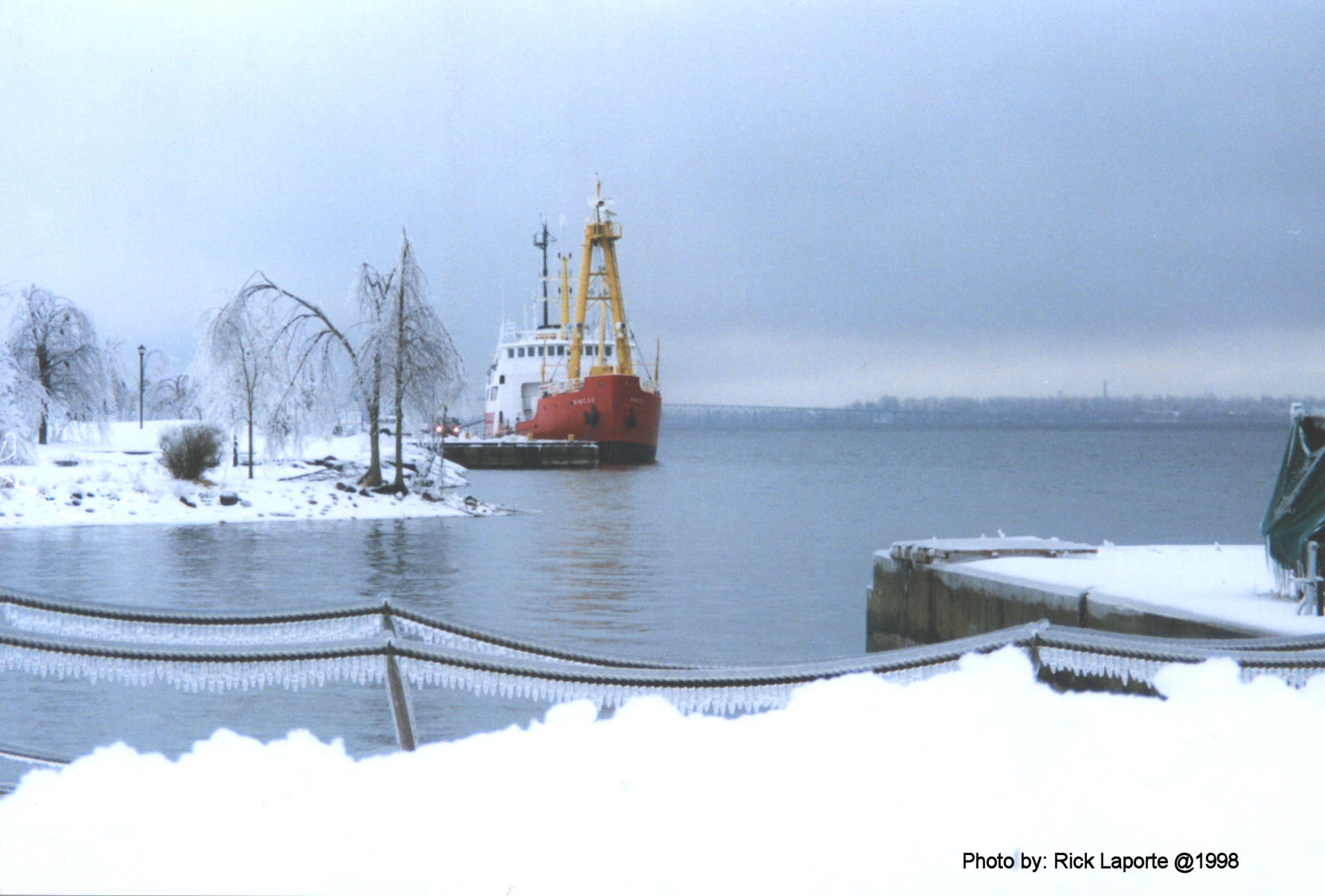
CCGS Simcoe at Prescott, Ontario during the Great Icestorm of 1998

The ship was constructed by Canadian Vickers at their shipyard in Montreal, Quebec with the yard number 279. The second Canadian government ship named for John Graves Simcoe, the first Lieutenant-Governor of Upper Canada, the ship entered service in November 1962. The vessel was registered in Ottawa, Ontario, but was homeported at Prescott, Ontario in the Central Region for use on the Great Lakes and St. Lawrence Seaway.

Simcoe underwent modernisation in 1988. Remaining operational for 45 years, Simcoe was decommissioned and renamed 2007-01 in 2008. The vessel was sold in June 2008 to Sheridan Platinum Group Ltd, of Ontario.
