= CCGS Brant =

History

Canada
- Name: Brant
- Namesake: Joseph Brant
- Operator: Department of Marine; Department of Transport Marine Service; Canadian Coast Guard
- Builder: Government Shipyard, Sorel
- Launched: 1927
- Completed: 1928
- Decommissioned: 1966
- Homeport: Dartmouth
- Fate: Sold 1967

General characteristics
- Type: Buoy and lighthouse (navigation aid) tender
- Tonnage: 285 GRT
- Length: 125 ft (38.1 m)
- Beam: 23 ft (7.0 m)
- Draught: 12 ft (3.7 m)
- Propulsion: Triple expansion steam engine; 350 ihp (261 kW)
- Speed: 10 knots (19 km/h)

CCGS Brant (Note: CCGS stands for Canadian Coast Guard Ship) was a Canadian Coast Guard vessel in service between 1928 and 1966. Stationed on the East Coast of Canada, Brant was deployed as a navigation aids tender. Brant was the last coal-burning vessel in Canadian government service.

== Description ==
Brant was a steel-hulled vessel of trawler-design. The ship had a tonnage of 285 gross register tons (GRT) and was 125 feet (38.1 m) long with a beam of 23 feet (7.0 m) and a draught of 12 feet (3.7 m). The ship was powered by a triple expansion steam engine driving one screw, creating 350 indicated horsepower (261 kW). This gave the vessel a maximum speed of 10 knots (19 km/h).

== Service history ==
Brant was constructed by the Government Shipyard in Sorel, Quebec and was launched in 1927. The vessel was completed in 1928. The vessel was the second ship to be named for Joseph Brant in Canadian service. Initially in service with the Department of Marine as CGS Brant, (Note: CGS stands for Canadian Government Ship) Brant served as a navigation aids vessel for the Department of Transport's Marine Service, stationed at Dartmouth, Nova Scotia. In 1962, Brant joined the Canadian Coast Guard. The vessel was decommissioned in 1966 and sold in 1967. Brant was the last coal-burning vessel in the Canadian government fleet.

== Sources ==
- Appleton, Thomas E. (1969). Usque Ad Mare: A History of the Canada Coast Guard and Marine Services. Ottawa: Department of Transport. OCLC 2230587.
- "Brant (5050505)". Miramar Ship Index.
- Maginley, Charles D. & Collin, Bernard (2001). The Ships of Canada's Marine Services. St. Catharines, Ontario: Vanwell Publishing Limited. ISBN 1-55125-070-5.
