= CCGS Cove Isle =

Navigation aids tender in the Canadian Coast Guard

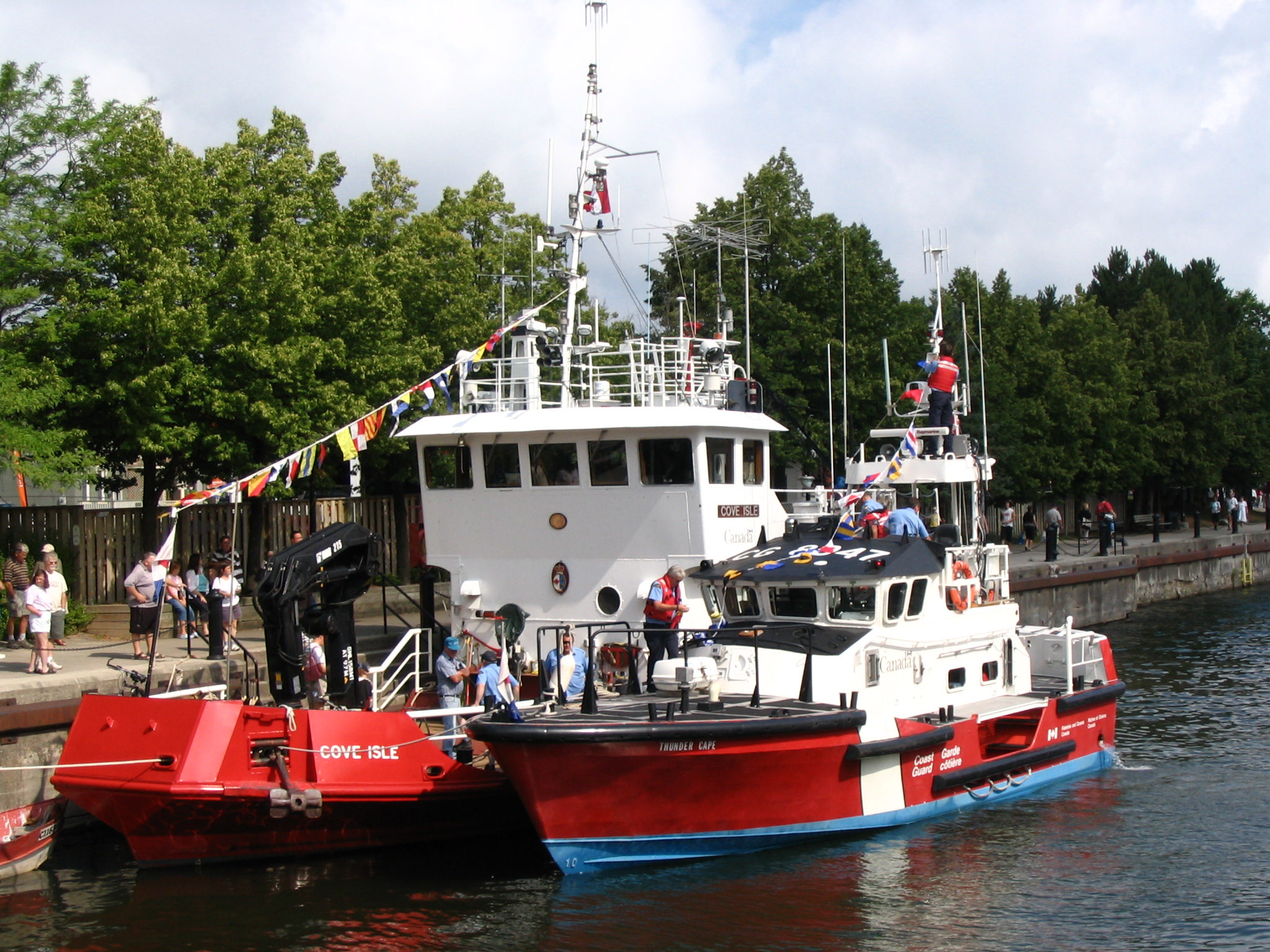
- CCGS Cove Isle and CCGS Thunder Cape, in Owen Sound

History

Canada
- Name: Cove Isle
- Operator: Canadian Coast Guard
- Builder: Canadian Dredge & Dock Ltd., Kingston
- Launched: 1980
- Completed: 1980
- Commissioned: 1980
- In service: 1980–present
- Home port: CCG Base Parry Sound, Ontario
- Identification: MMSI number: 316011684; Callsign: VX5564
- Status: in active service

General characteristics
- Type: Specialty Vessel - Navigational aid tender
- Tonnage: 92.05 GT
- Length: 20 m (65 ft 7 in)
- Beam: 6 m (19 ft 8 in)
- Draught: 1.7 m (5 ft 7 in)
- Propulsion: 2 Cummins diesel engines
- Speed: 12 knots (22 km/h)
- Range: 2,000 nautical miles (3,700 km)
- Endurance: 14 days
- Complement: 5
- Sensors & processing systems: 127 E Sperry radar, Loran-Internav GPS, Magnavox Ray 88 × 2 and Ray 90 × 1 radios, ELAC and Datamarine depth sounders

CCGS Cove Isle is a navigation aids tender in the Canadian Coast Guard. Cove Isle is assigned to the Canadian Coast Guard's Central and Arctic Region and is based out of CGS Base Parry Sound, Ontario, on Georgian Bay.

The ship is classified as specialist vessel and used in a variety of roles:

- Resupplies and maintaining lighthouse stations along Georgian Bay
- carries out search and rescue support
- pollution cleanup duties (as required)
- science research support

The ship is not strengthened for navigation in ice-infested waters, so she operates from April to December, or when waterways are ice free. She has a crew of five.

Her length overall (LOA) is 20 meters and her width is 6 meters.
