= CGS Aberdeen =

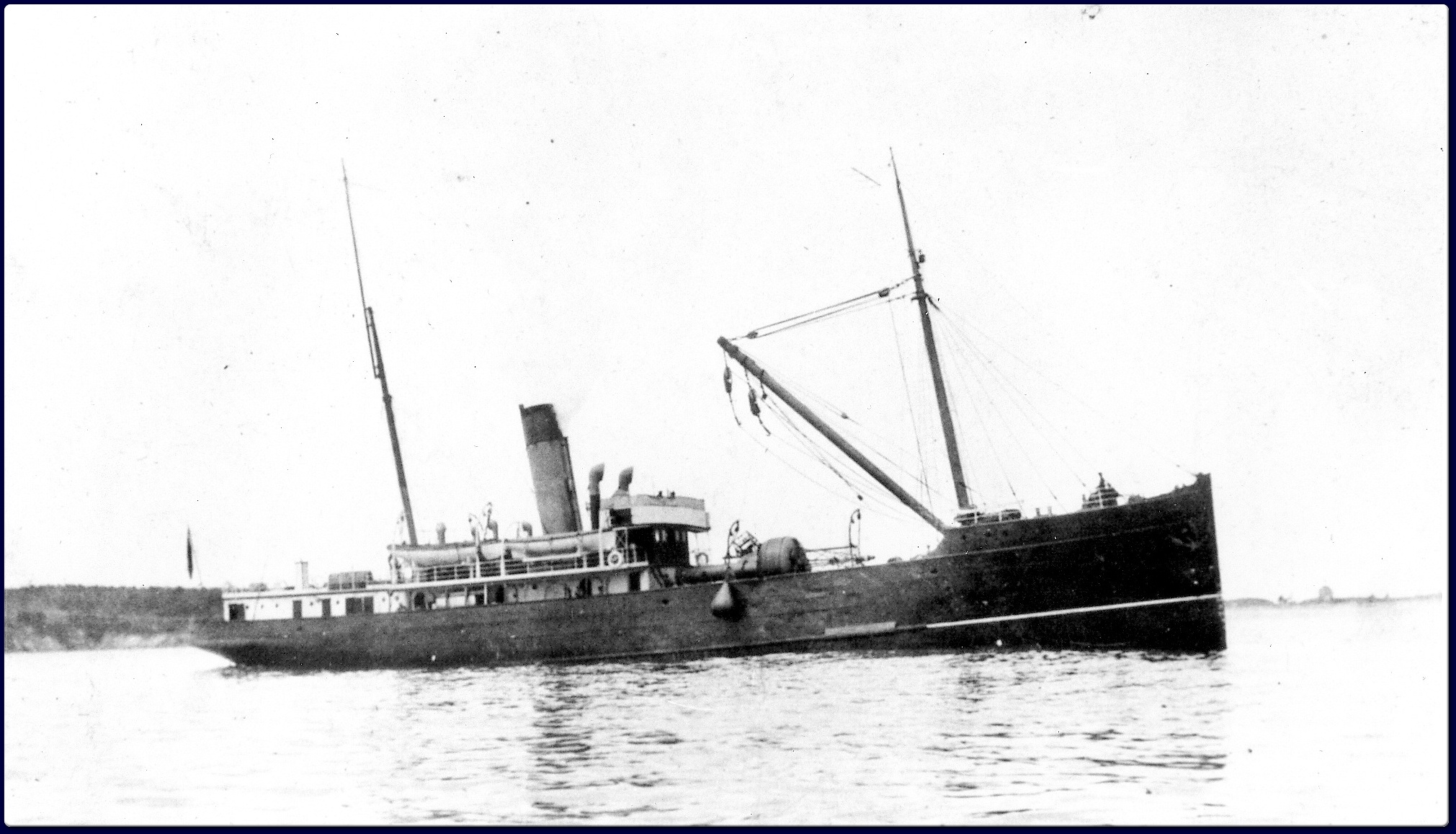
- Aberdeen in 1894

History

Dominion of Canada
- Name: Aberdeen
- Owner: Government of Canada
- Operator: Department of Marine
- Port of registry: Ottawa, Ontario
- Builder: Fleming & Ferguson, Paisley, Scotland
- Laid down: 1893
- Launched: 19 June 1894
- Completed: August 1894
- In service: 1894–1923
- Stricken: 1923
- Fate: Wrecked, 13 October 1923

General characteristics
- Type: Lighthouse supply and buoy tender
- Tonnage: 674 GRT
- Length: 180 ft (55 m)
- Beam: 31 ft (9.4 m)
- Draft: 19 ft (5.8 m)
- Propulsion: Quadruple expansion steam engine; 1 × screw
- Speed: 13 knots (24 km/h)
- Complement: 45

CGS Aberdeen was a Canadian Government Ship launched in 1894, which served as a lighthouse supply and buoy vessel. The vessel served on the East Coast of Canada until 1923, when the vessel ran aground on Seal Island, Nova Scotia.

== Description ==
Constructed of steel, Aberdeen was 180 feet (55 m) long with a beam of 31 feet (9.4 m) and a draught of 19 feet (5.8 m). The vessel had a tonnage of 674 gross register tons (GRT). Powered by a quadruple expansion steam engine that drove one screw, Aberdeen had a maximum speed of 13 knots (24 km/h). Originally flush-decked and able to set fore and aft sail, she was later rebuilt with a high forecastle and a heavy derrick forward.

== Service history ==
Aberdeen was ordered in 1893 from Fleming & Ferguson and constructed at their yard in Paisley, Scotland. The ship was launched on 19 June 1894 and completed in August of that year. The ship was named for the Earl of Aberdeen, the Governor General of Canada at the time. Entering service in 1894, Aberdeen was initially deployed as a lighthouse supply and buoy vessel along the Atlantic coast of Canada. The vessel was later transferred to Quebec before returning to the Atlantic coast in 1904 when the vessel was assigned to Saint John, New Brunswick.

=== Loss ===
On 13 October 1923, Aberdeen sailed from Yarmouth in thick fog on an inspection tour. She carried a crew of forty-five men under the command of Captain Loran A. Kenney. At about 13:00 Aberdeen was approaching the Black Ledge, about 2.01 km (1.25 miles) from Seal Island, when she struck the wreck of the trawler Snipe, which had sunk the previous June. The collision ripped a 25-foot-long (7.6 m) hole in her side. The ship filled and settled on the ledge within 15 minutes. Aberdeen sent a mayday signal by radio, and her sister ship Laurentian sailed from Saint John immediately, along with Acadia from Halifax, Nova Scotia and Arleux from Briar Island.

The ship had about 500 bags of cement destined for the Cape Sable Light aboard, and also drums of calcium carbide, that caused much concern (as it reacts with water to form the flammable gas acetylene). About 25 of the crew were sent to the Seal Island Light Station in the ship's boats, while the remainder stayed aboard to assist in salvaging as much of the wreck as they could.
