= Woolwich Ferry =

Ferry across the River Thames in east London

Coordinates: 51.4961°N 0.062°E

- London River Services
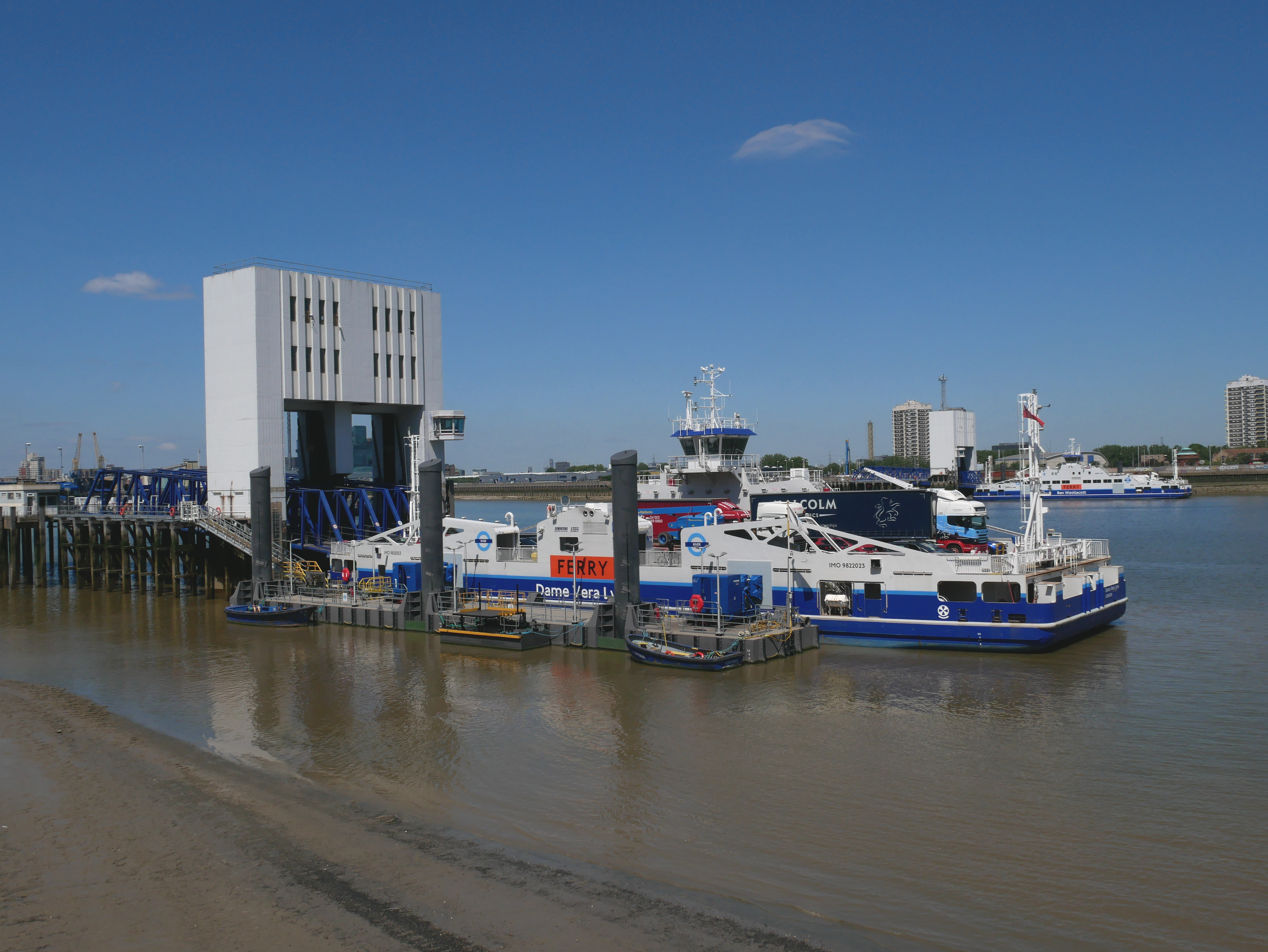
- The south terminal of the Woolwich Ferry
- Locale: Woolwich, London
- Waterway: River Thames
- Transit type: Passenger and vehicle ferry
- Owner: London River Services
- Operator: London River Services
- Began operation: 23 March 1889; 137 years ago
- No. of lines: 1
- No. of vessels: 2
- No. of terminals: 2
- Daily ridership: 7,100
- Website: Official website

The Woolwich Ferry is a free vehicle and pedestrian ferry across the River Thames in east London, connecting Woolwich on the south bank with North Woolwich on the north. It is licensed and financed by London River Services, the maritime arm of Transport for London (TfL). Around two million passengers use the ferry each year.

A ferry has operated on the Thames at Woolwich since the 14th century, and commercial crossings operated intermittently until the mid-19th. The free service opened in 1889 after tolls were abolished on bridges to the west of London. Traffic increased in the 20th century because of the rise in motor vehicle traffic and it remained popular because of the lack of nearby bridges. Pedestrian use dropped after the construction of a parallel foot tunnel and the extension of the Docklands Light Railway to Woolwich Arsenal station. Alternatives such as the Thames Gateway Bridge and Gallions Reach Crossing have been proposed as replacements, but there are no plans to discontinue the Woolwich Ferry as long as there is demand.

== Services ==
The Woolwich Ferry route, connecting the North Circular and South Circular Roads. The Woolwich foot tunnel runs alongside the ferry and the Docklands Light Railway parallels the route from King George V to Woolwich Arsenal.

The service links Woolwich in the Royal Borough of Greenwich with North Woolwich in the London Borough of Newham. It also links two ends of the inner London orbital road routes: the North Circular and the South Circular.

The ferry operates from 6.00 am until 10.00 pm with a two-boat service (15 minutes nominal interval between sailings). The ferries can carry heavy goods vehicles and other road traffic across the river, up to a maximum height of 4.7 metres (15 ft) and width of 3.5 metres (11 ft), except for anything carrying goods prohibited by the International Maritime Dangerous Goods Code or displaying a Hazchem warning sign. The service is free for all traffic; in 2012 Transport for London (TfL) estimated a subsidy cost of 76.5p per passenger.

=== Nearest alternative crossings ===
The nearest alternative crossing for pedestrians is the Woolwich foot tunnel about 100 metres (110 yds) to the east. A Docklands Light Railway (DLR) station, Woolwich Arsenal on the south side of the Thames, was opened in January 2009 as the new terminus of the London City Airport branch. King George V DLR station, on the opposite side of the river, is close to the north ferry dock.

The nearest vehicle alternatives are the Silvertown Tunnel about two miles (3 km) upstream to the west, or the Dartford Crossing around ten miles (16 km) downstream to the east. Both alternative routes incur toll charges.

== History ==
=== Early services ===
There has been a connection across the Thames between what is now Old Woolwich and what would later be North Woolwich since the Norman Conquest. The area was mentioned in Domesday Book as 63 acres (25 ha) belonging to Hamon, the dapifer (steward), "which belong to (pertinent in) Woolwich"; the "pertinent" here refers to the portion of land north of the Thames yet also part of the county of Kent. State papers in 1308 show that a service was running between North Woolwich and Warren Lane. That year, William de Wicton sold the business to William atte Halle for £10. The ferry was subsequently sold in 1320 for 100 silver marks.

Woolwich Ferry Act 1811
- Act of Parliament
- Parliament of the United Kingdom
- Long title: An Act for establishing a Ferry across the River Thames at Woolwich, in the County of Kent.
- Citation: 51 Geo. 3. c. cxcix

Dates
- Royal assent: 26 June 1811

Other legislation
- Amended by: Woolwich Ferry Act 1815; Woolwich Ferry Act 1816

Text of statute as originally enacted

Woolwich Ferry Act 1815
- Act of Parliament
- Parliament of the United Kingdom
- Long title: An Act to amend an Act of His present Majesty, for establishing a Ferry across the River Thames at Woolwich, in the County of Kent.
- Citation: 55 Geo. 3. c. xviii

Dates
- Royal assent: 2 May 1815

Other legislation
- Amends: Woolwich Ferry Act 1811

Text of statute as originally enacted

Woolwich Ferry Act 1816
- Act of Parliament
- Parliament of the United Kingdom
- Long title: An Act to repeal a certain Part of an Act passed in the last Session of Parliament, intituled "An Act to amend an Act of His present Majesty, for establishing a Ferry across the River Thames at Woolwich, in the County of Kent.
- Citation: 56 Geo. 3. c. xxvii

Dates
- Royal assent: 21 May 1816

Other legislation
- Amends: Woolwich Ferry Act 1811

Text of statute as originally enacted

Cross-river traffic increased following the establishment of the Royal Arsenal in 1671. To enable movement of troops and supplies, the army established its own ferry in 1810. The following year the Woolwich Ferry Act 1811 (51 Geo. 3. c. cxcix) established a commercial ferry company, but it was dissolved in 1844. In 1846, the Eastern Counties and Thames Junction Railway extended its lines to include a Thames wharf branch; eventually three steam ferries operated, but they proved inadequate to meet the growing demand. In October 1880, a public meeting was held in Woolwich to discuss setting up a locally run steam-ferry service, but the cost was seen as prohibitive.

Following the establishment of the Metropolitan Board of Works, which had taken over toll bridges in west London and opened them to free public use, it was suggested that the board should fund a free crossing of the Thames in east London. Proposals were made to provide services at Woolwich and further upstream at Greenwich, but the latter plan was abandoned. In 1884 the board agreed to provide two steam-powered ferries, each costing £10,650, and asked chief engineer Sir Joseph Bazalgette to lead design and construction. In September 1887 Messrs Mowlem and company were awarded contracts valued at £54,900 to build approaches, bridges and pontoons.

=== Modern service ===
The service was officially opened on 23 March 1889, with the paddle steamer Gordon. Two days before the first service, the Metropolitan Board of Works was replaced by the London County Council (LCC), and the opening ceremony was conducted by Lord Rosebery instead of the expected Bazalgette. The sister vessel Duncan was introduced on 20 April.

By the end of the 1920s, the rise in motor traffic had put pressure on the ferry's capacity. A proposed bridge between Shooter's Hill and East Ham was rejected as too obvious a target for wartime bombings, and a third vessel was introduced instead. Because of the lack of a fixed crossing, the Thames became a psychological barrier for those living east of central London, who could only use a limited number of routes to cross the river, including the Woolwich Ferry. The lack of a suitable alternative route was instrumental in creating plans for what eventually became the Dartford Crossing further downstream.

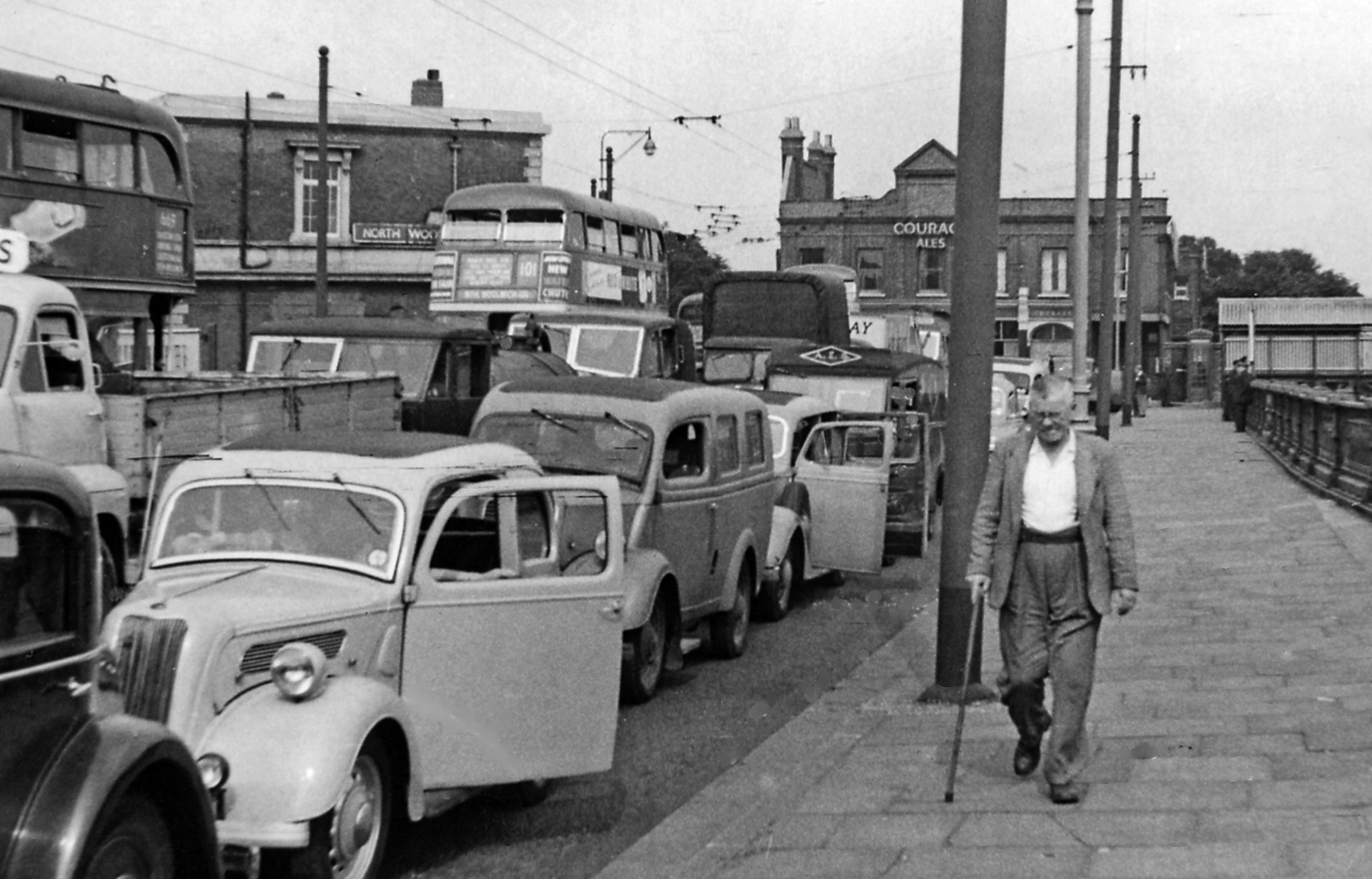
Traffic queueing at North Woolwich for the Woolwich Ferry in 1955. The modernisation of the roll-on/roll-off service in 1963 reduced waiting times.

By the 1950s it was quicker for ferry traffic to divert via the Blackwall Tunnel even with all three vessels operating at full capacity. In April 1963, the paddle steamers were replaced and the ferry service upgraded to a more modern roll-on/roll-off model, reducing waiting times on the approach roads. The LCC continued to operate the ferry until it was replaced by the Greater London Council (GLC) on 31 March 1965. In 1964, Marples Ridgway started building the current reinforced concrete terminals, which can operate over a 30 feet (9.1 m) tidal range. The current terminals were opened in 1966.

After the abolition of the GLC in 1986, the responsibility for operating the service was transferred to the Secretary of State for Transport, who contracted the then London Borough of Greenwich to run the service. Asset ownership and operating rights were subsequently transferred to Transport for London (TfL) on the establishment of the Greater London Authority, but the London Borough of Greenwich continued to operate the ferry on behalf of TfL.

In March 2008, the London Borough of Greenwich gave TfL notice that it would cease operating the service from 30 September 2008. On 12 September TfL announced that the outsourcing group Serco would take over the operation of the service from 1 October 2008; the contract ran initially until 31 March 2010. Control of the crossing passed from Serco to Briggs Marine, which was expanding into public passenger services, in December 2012. The company was awarded a £50 million seven-year contract, which began in April 2013.

In 2014, TfL began an upgrade of the ferry service, starting by refurbishing the piers and in 2016 ordering two new boats to replace the existing vessels that were nearing the end of their working life. In early 2017, it was announced that the new ferries were being built by Polish firm Remontowa to a design by Norwegian company LMG Marin. The diesel-electric hybrid vessels have 210 metres (690 ft) of space for road vehicles over several lanes and dedicated cyclist accommodation. The vessels are licensed to carry 150 passengers segregated from road traffic. Continuing the tradition of naming the ferries after local people, it was announced in June 2017 that the two new vessels would be named after Dame Vera Lynn, a singer and entertainer from nearby East Ham, and Ben Woollacott, the 19-year-old deckhand on the Woolwich Ferry who drowned after being dragged overboard in a mooring accident in 2011.

In October 2018, the Woolwich Ferry was suspended for four months in order to undertake major repair work for the piers, and the existing vessels were taken out of service. The foot tunnel remained open. The ferry service resumed on 1 February 2019.

Following expiry of Briggs Marine's contract in December 2020, the service is now run by London River Services. Under TfL-owned London River Services’ stewardship, services on the route were reduced to end at 7pm weekdays rather than 10pm. In addition, only one of the two new ferries was in service between 2020 and 2024, with TfL citing staffing challenges as the reason for the roughly 70% reduction in capacity. In 2024, services were restored to end at 10pm.

=== Incidents ===
On 3 August 2011, 19-year-old ferry worker Ben Woollacott died after falling off the boat into the River Thames. The MAIB report published in August 2012 blamed "unseamanlike working practices" during the unmooring operation for the death. When two new ships were bought to update the service in 2018, one was named after him.

== Fleet ==
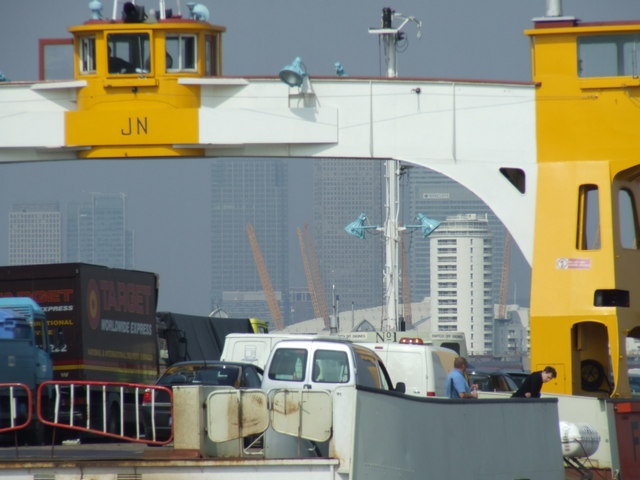
Traffic boarding the James Newman. The ferry service is important for HGVs owing to restrictions in the Blackwall Tunnel and northbound Dartford Crossing.

The first ferries were the side-loading paddle steamers Gordon, Duncan and Hutton, named after General Gordon of Khartoum, Colonel Francis Duncan MP and Professor Charles Hutton. Each was powered by a condensing engine manufactured by John Penn and Sons of Greenwich, producing 100 nominal horsepower.

The initial fleet was eventually replaced, starting in 1923 with The Squire (named after William Squires, a former mayor of Woolwich), and in 1930 with the Will Crooks (Crooks was Labour MP for Woolwich, 1903–21) and the John Benn (Benn was a member of the London County Council, Liberal MP for St George—which included Wapping—and grandfather of Tony Benn).

Three vessels were built in Dundee in 1963 by the Caledon Shipbuilding & Engineering Company to replace the paddle steamers, and were each named after prominent local politicians: James Newman (mayor of Woolwich, 1923–25), John Burns, and Ernest Bevin. These ferries featured Voith Schneider propulsion systems for manoeuvrability. A cycloidal propeller was fitted centrally at either end, each driven by a 500bhp 6-cylinder Mirrlees Blackstone diesel engine. Transport for London introduced an Art On The River scheme in 2014, showing decorative artwork on the ferry vessels. These vessels ceased operation on 5 October 2018, after which service was suspended for four months and the ferries sold for demolition.

Two new vessels, the Ben Woollacott and the Dame Vera Lynn, were delivered from the Remontowa shipyard in Gdańsk, Poland, to replace the previous fleet in October 2018. The new vessels entered service on 1 February 2019. They have suffered from numerous technical issues resulting in closures and service reductions, with Mayor of London Sadiq Khan apologising in November 2019 and stating the new ferries "aren't good enough".

== Passenger numbers ==
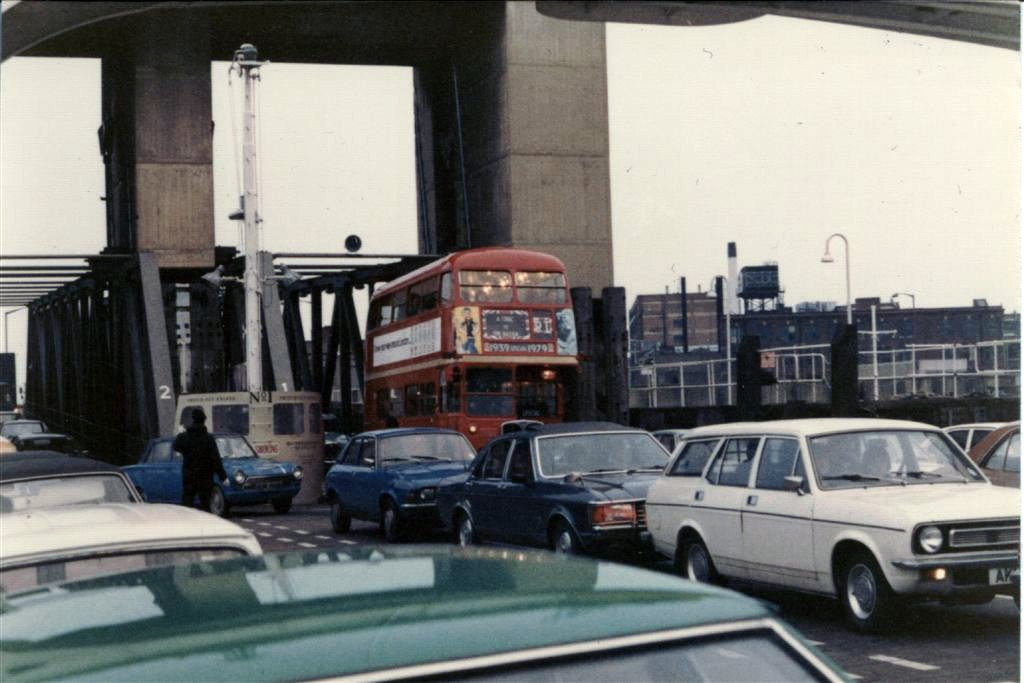
Vehicles embarking on the ferry in 1979

The ferry typically carries about two million passengers a year; occupants of vehicles (including drivers) are counted as passengers. In 2012 the ferry carried around 20,000 vehicles and 50,000 passengers weekly.

At all times of day, but particularly at peak hours, it is common for vehicles to have to queue beyond the next ferry departure. Various improvements have been made to the vehicle queueing arrangements over the years, especially to avoid impacting local traffic.

For foot passengers, bus services connect to both terminals. There is a small bus station on the north side, but some cross-river foot passengers take the foot tunnel instead. About 300 foot passengers used the ferry daily between 1983 and 1985. Further competition arrived in 2009 with the extension to Woolwich of the Docklands Light Railway, which crosses under the river to the east of the crossing and the tunnel, and has led to a reduction in the number of foot passengers using the ferry.

After toll charges were imposed at the Blackwall and Silvertown Tunnels in April 2025, TfL reported a daily increase in ferry traffic of around 1,800 vehicles as drivers sought to avoid the charges.

== Future ==
The ferry service provides one of the few road crossings of the Thames east of the City of London. As long as there is a demand for a vehicle ferry it is unlikely to be discontinued, and doing so would require changing the Metropolitan Board of Works (Various Powers) Act 1885.

Planning applications were submitted for a new bridge, the Thames Gateway Bridge, close to the Woolwich Ferry, in 2004 although the project was cancelled in 2008. In 2012, the Mayor of London, Boris Johnson, announced the Gallions Reach Crossing, a replacement ferry service running further east from Beckton to Thamesmead which was expected to open in 2017. This did not occur and has been replaced with proposals for either a new bridge or tunnel in the area. TfL planning director Richard de Cani has said that the ferry will continue to operate as long as there are no alternatives, and there are no current plans to discontinue the service.

Tolls cannot be levied on the ferry without changing the 1885 Act of Parliament. However, it is possible that the service may eventually be tolled in conjunction with other projects.

== Media appearances ==
The Woolwich ferry has made several appearances on TV and film. The John Benn is seen being destroyed by the titular monster in the film Behemoth, the Sea Monster. A detailed scale model is used to interact with a model of the monster's head, which capsizes the ship in the Thames.

== See also ==
- List of crossings of the River Thames
