= NLV Pole Star (2025) =

Lighthouse tender

History

United Kingdom
- Name: Pole Star
- Operator: Northern Lighthouse Board
- Port of registry: Leith
- Builder: Astilleros_Gondán, Castropol, Spain
- Cost: £51.8 million
- Yard number: C-505
- Laid down: October 2023 (first steel cut)
- Launched: 14 January 2025
- Commissioned: 3 December 2025
- Home port: Oban
- Identification: IMO number: 9993614; MMSI number: 232055834; Callsign: MPMG8
- Status: In service

General characteristics
- Type: Buoy maintenance vessel
- Tonnage: 2,872 GT; 960 NT
- Displacement: 1,174 t (1,155 long tons)
- Length: o/a: 70.00 m (229 ft 8 in)
- Beam: 16.00 m (52 ft 6 in)
- Draught: 3.90 m (12 ft 10 in)
- Depth: to Main Deck: 6.40 m (21 ft 0 in)
- Propulsion: Diesel-electric hybrid: 3 × MAN 12V175D-MEV IMO Tier III 3x 1860 kW, 2 x Schottel Rudder Propeller SRP 460 LE FP - 2x2000 kW, 2 x Schottel Transverse Thruster STT 2 FP - 2x550 kW, Corvus Blue Whale 4644 kWh batteries
- Speed: 14 knots (26 km/h; 16 mph)
- Notes: The ship, also referred to as Pole Star V, replaced an earlier vessel also called Pole Star.

NLV Pole Star is a lighthouse tender operated by the Northern Lighthouse Board (NLB), the body responsible for the operation of lighthouses and marine navigation aids around the coasts of Scotland and the Isle of Man.

== History ==
The contract for the ship build was awarded in December 2022 at a total cost of £51.8 million, that included £2 million with UK suppliers. Built at Astilleros Gondán, Castropol, Spain, the first steel was cut in October 2023 and the completed hull was launched in January 2025. Pole Star is the fifth NLB vessel to carry the name and replaced the 25-year old fourth Pole Star which had been sold and renamed prior to the arrival of the new vessel.

The new vessel undertook sea trials during November 2025, before formally being accepted by the Northern Lighthouse Board on 3 December 2025. On 22 December 2025, the ship left Gijon in Spain and sailed to Scotland via the Bay of Biscay and Western Approaches. She arrived in Oban, her home port, for the first time on Christmas Day 2025, accompanied by the local RNLI lifeboat.

== Equipment ==
To support lighthouse tendering and buoyage maintenance, Pole Star is fitted with three Sormec Cranes - 1 x 20T SWL of 16m radius, 1 x 6 tonne of 11m radius and a 1 x 2T SWL Stiff Boom Provision Crane. She is also fitted with a Jason MM602 firefighting sea water pump, capable of 900m³/hour with a 40m height x 100m length throw.

The ship also has underwater survey capability. Her navigation, manoeuvring and bridge equipment includes DP2 functionality, a Kongsberg bridge suite, two aft azimuth thrusters and two bow transverse thrusters.

For her main propulsion, the ship is fitted with hybrid-electric propulsion that is composed of a diesel engine and a battery system.
