= Remontowa =

Gdańska Stocznia "Remontowa" im. J. Piłsudskiego S.A.

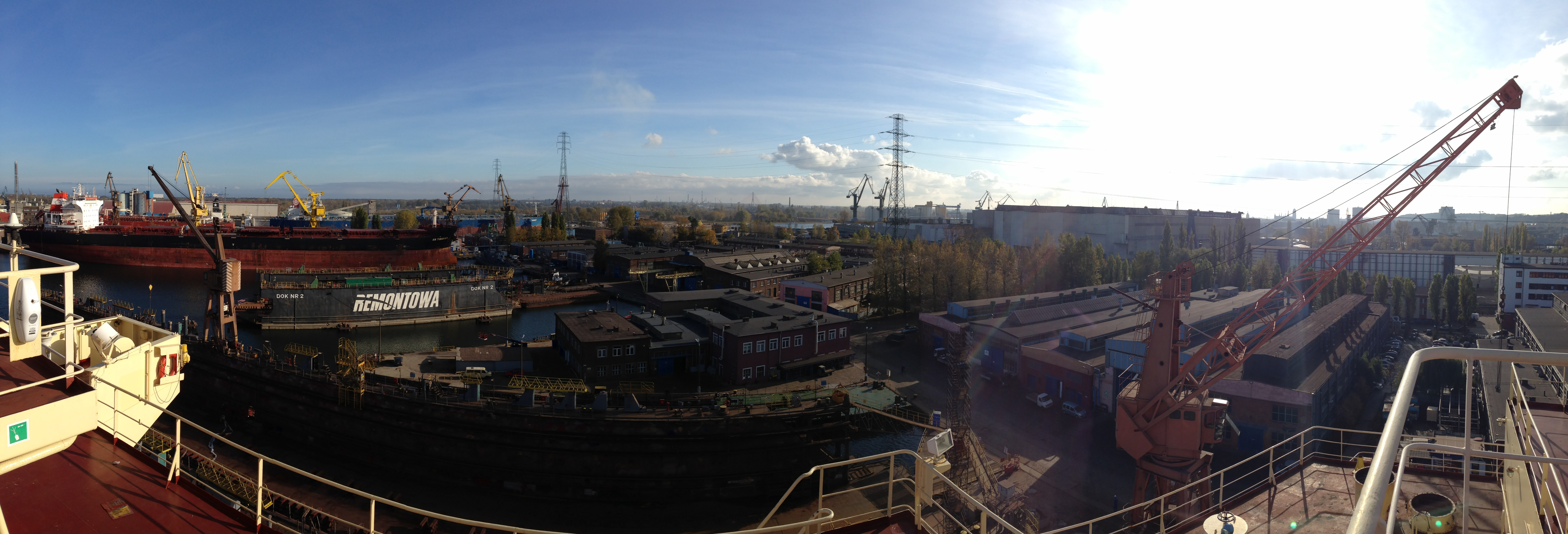
- Type: Spółka akcyjna
- Industry: Shipbuilding
- Founded: 1952
- Headquarters: Gdańsk, Poland
- Key people: Michał Habina (President and CEO)
- Parent: Remontowa Group
- Website: www.remontowa.com.pl

Remontowa (full name: Gdańska Stocznia "Remontowa” im. Józefa Piłsudskiego S.A.) is a company and shipyard in Gdańsk, Poland. The yard specialises in ship repair and conversions. Remontowa S.A. is one of 26 companies that make up the Remontowa Group. It is the biggest shipyard in Poland.

== History ==
- The yard was established on 1 July 1952 as Baza Remontowa - Ostrów with its registered office in Gdańsk.
- Its name was changed to Gdańska Stocznia Remontowa on 7 November 1952.
- In the 1960s, the yard built warships and research vessels for the Polish Navy and for export to the USSR, operating under the name Northern Shipyard.
- A stone monument to Polish statesman Józef Piłsudski, whose name was later appended to the shipyard's full legal name, was erected at the yard in 1997.

== Facilities ==
Remontowa shipyard has a new-build shipyard and a separate ship repair/conversion yard. The site also has a design officer and some component manufacturing facilities.

== Newbuilds ==
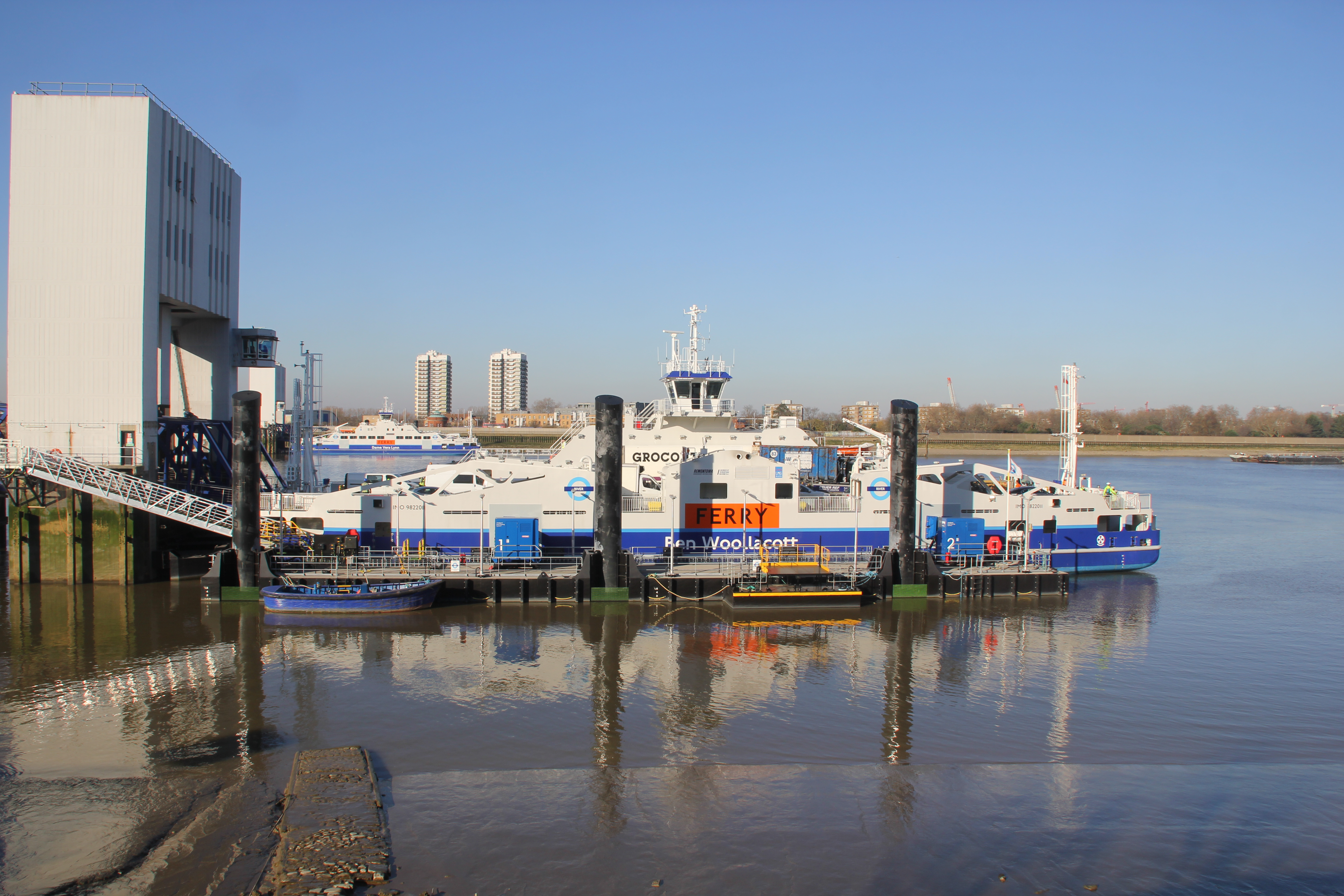
Ben Woollacott loading at Woolwich terminal, with Dame Vera Lynn in background

- Car ferries Argyle, Bute and Finlaggan for Scottish ferry operator Caledonian MacBrayne
- Hybrid car ferries Ben Woollacott and Dame Vera Lynn for Transport for London's Woolwich Ferry
- All four members of the Salish-class ferries for BC Ferries
- Luxury passenger ferries Simara Ace and Siluna Ace for Ace Link
- Car ferries Piret and Tõll for Estonian operator TS Laevad
- Four LNG powered car ferries for Norwegian ferry operator Fjord1
- Multi functional tenders Galatea & Pharos
- Icebreaking Emergency Evacuation Vessel
- ORP Kormoran (601) - mine-hunter of the Polish Navy
- Six tugboats for the Polish Navy, the sixth, designated H-13 was completed in May 2021.

== Conversions ==
- Lodbrog - Conversion into cable layer
- Red Osprey, Red Eagle and Red Falcon - Lengthened
- Queen of Scandinavia - Fitting of new bow section and sponsons
- Stena Baltica - Rebuilt for double deck loading
- Finnpartner - Conversion to drive through vehicle ferry
- Dana Sirena - Conversion from freight to passenger ferry
- Peter Wessel - Addition of side sponsons to meet SOLAS regulations
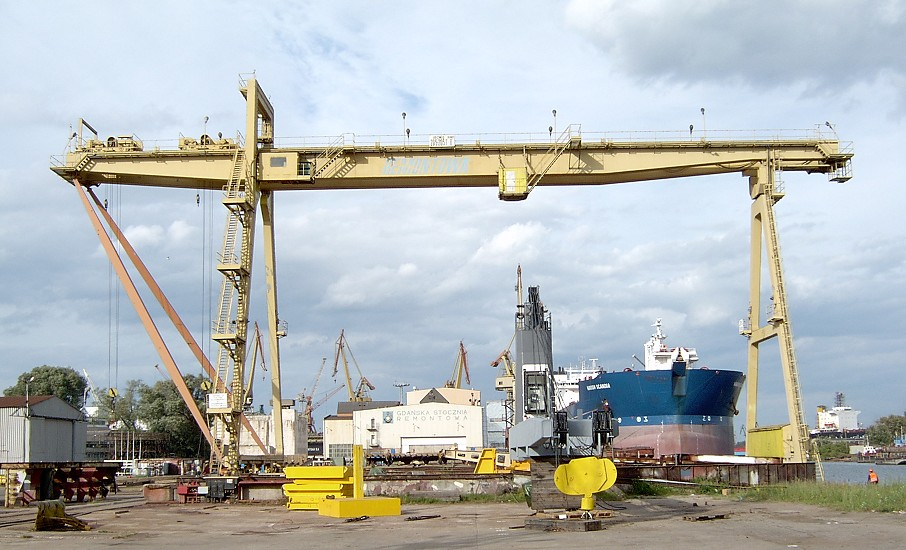
Gangtry crane

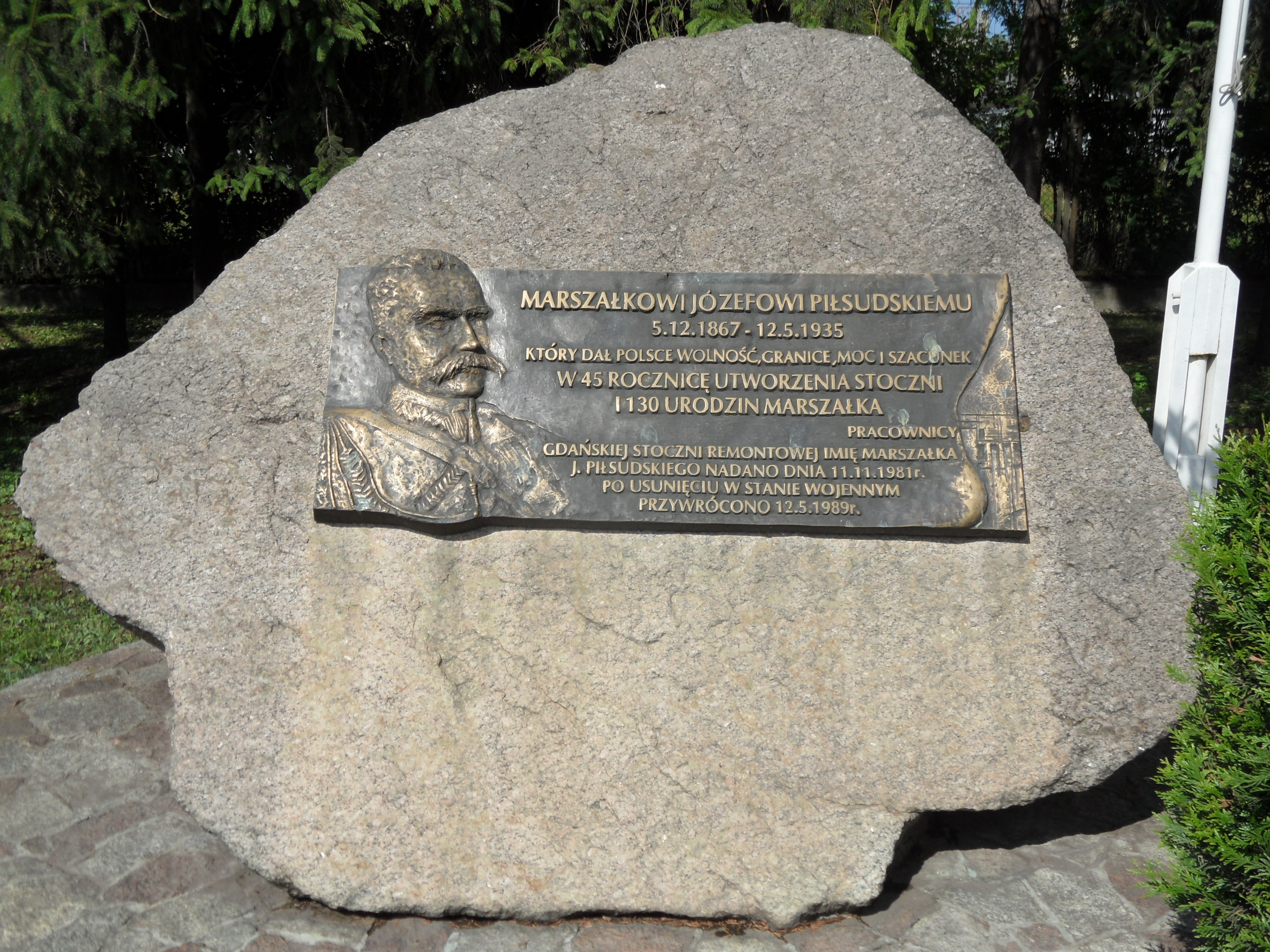
Marshal Jozef Pilsudski monument Remontowa 1997

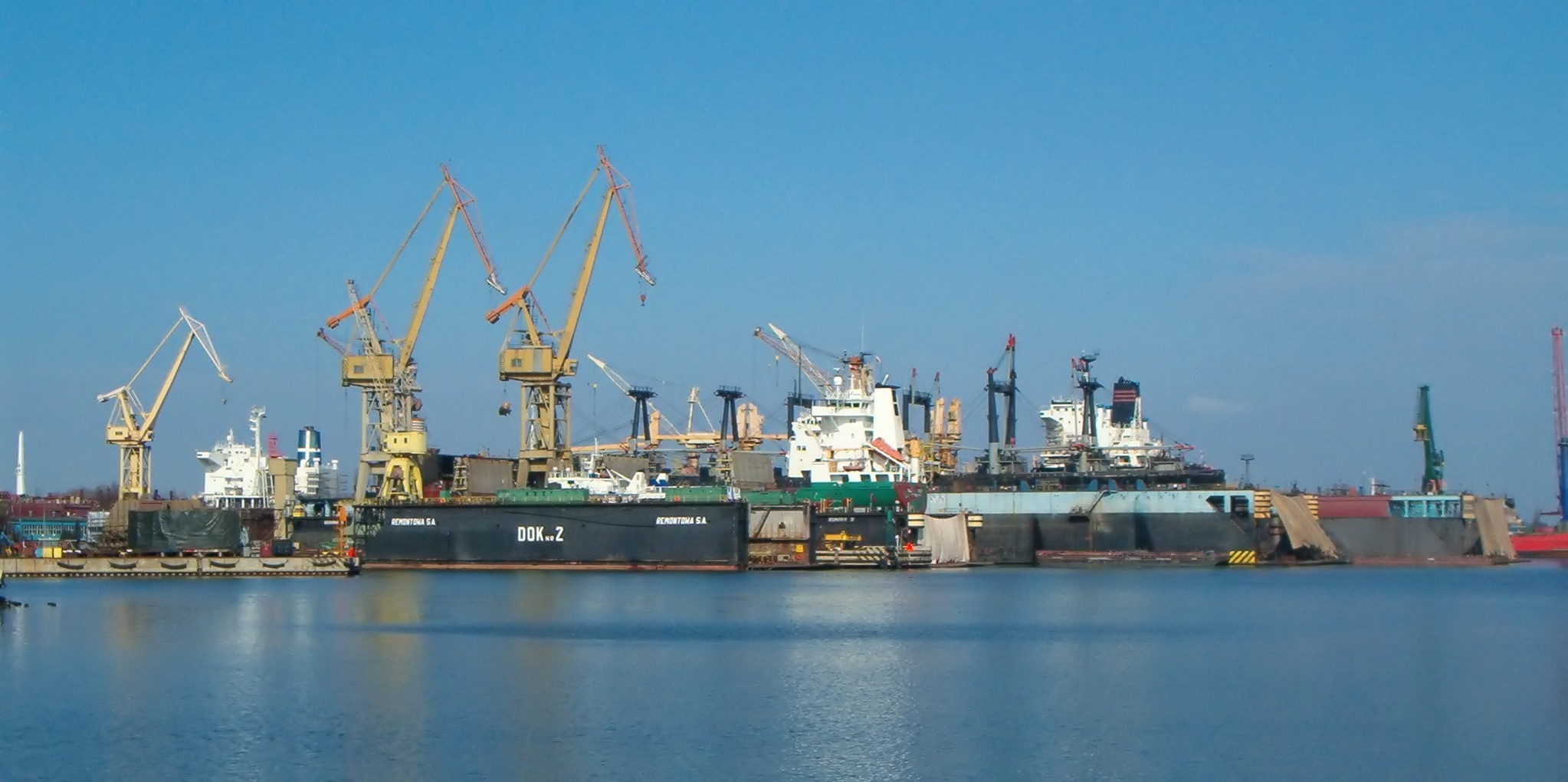
Floating docks

== See also ==
- Gdansk Shipyard
