= USCG inland buoy tender =

Class of American buoy tenders

USCG Inland Buoy Tenders.are vessels operated by the United States Coast Guard that maintain and replace navigational buoys on inland waterways. There are two classes of vessels.

The 100-foot Class Inland Buoy Tenders consists of the following boats:

- USCGC Bluebell (WLI-313); Portland, Oregon, (commissioned 28 September 1944)
- USCGC Buckthorn (WLI-642); Sault Ste. Marie, Michigan, (commissioned 18 August 1963)

The 65-foot Class Inland Buoy Tenders consists of the following boats:

- USCGC Bayberry (WLI-65400); Oak Island (North Carolina), (commissioned, June 1954)
- USCGC Elderberry (WLI-65401); Petersburg, Alaska, (commissioned, June 1954)

== See also ==
- USCG coastal buoy tender
- USCG inland construction tender
- USCG seagoing buoy tender
