= CGS Simcoe =

Canadian lighthouse supply and buoy vessel

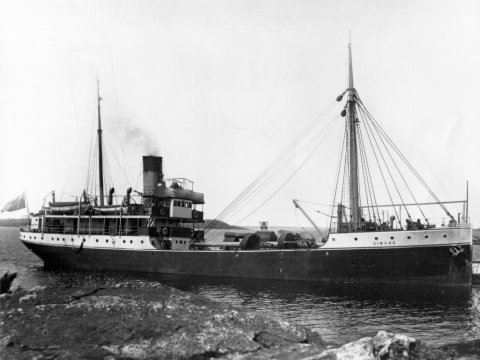
- Simcoe underway

History

Canada
- Name: Simcoe
- Owner: Government of Canada
- Operator: Department of Transport Marine Service
- Port of registry: Ottawa, Ontario
- Builder: Swan Hunter and Wigham Richardson Limited, Wallsend, England
- Launched: 21 January 1909
- Completed: March 1909
- In service: 1909–1917
- Home port: Parry Sound, Ontario
- Fate: Foundered 7 December 1917

General characteristics
- Type: Lighthouse supply and buoy vessel
- Tonnage: 913 GRT
- Length: 180 ft (55 m)
- Beam: 35 ft (11 m)
- Draught: 15 ft (4.6 m)
- Propulsion: Triple expansion steam engines; 2 shafts; 217 hp (162 kW) (nominal)

CGS Simcoe was a lighthouse supply and buoy vessel of the Canadian government acquired for service on the Great Lakes. Entering service in 1909, Simcoe was active until 1917 when the vessel foundered while transiting to Saint John, New Brunswick with the loss of 44 persons.

== Description ==
Simcoe was a lighthouse supply and buoy vessel of steel construction designed for service on the Great Lakes. The vessel was 180 feet (55 m) long with a beam of 35 feet (11 m) and a draught of 15 feet (4.6 m). The ship had a tonnage of 913 gross register tons (GRT). The vessel was powered by two triple expansion steam engines driving two screws generating 217 horsepower (162 kW) (nominal).

== Construction and career ==
Simcoe was ordered from Swan Hunter and Wigham Richardson Limited to be constructed in their yard at Wallsend, England. The ship was launched on 21 January 1909 and completed in March of the year. Simcoe was one of two vessels acquired at the time for permanent service on the Great Lakes. She was homeported in Parry Sound, Ontario.

Simcoe was ordered to the East Coast of Canada to replace Dollard. Based at Saint John, New Brunswick, the vessel was travelling from Sydney, Nova Scotia, having stopped en route at Bird Island Lighthouse to drop off supplies, to Saint John when the ship encountered a storm. On 7 December 1917, the vessel sank near the Magdalen Islands with all 44 people aboard. Only one distress signal was received before contact was lost with the ship.

== Sources ==
- Maginley, Charles D. & Collin, Bernard (2001). The Ships of Canada's Marine Services. St. Catharines, Ontario: Vanwell Publishing Limited. ISBN 1-55125-070-5.
- "Simcoe (1125456)". Miramar Ship Index.
