= Icebreaking Emergency Evacuation Vessel =

Special-purpose rescue lifeboats

- IBEEV 2 in the Caspian Sea

Class overview
- Name: Ice Breaking Emergency Evacuation Vessels
- Builders: Remontowa, Gdańsk, Poland
- Built: 2005–2012
- Completed: 10

General characteristics
- Length: 45.10 m (148 ft 0 in) o/a; 42.34 m (138 ft 11 in) w/l
- Beam: 8 m (26 ft 3 in)
- Draught: 2.1 m (6 ft 11 in)
- Depth: 3.6 m (11 ft 10 in)
- Ice class: DNV ICE-1B
- Propulsion: Diesel-electric; 2 × 800 kW (1,073 hp) main engines; 2 × 550 kW (738 hp) azimuth thrusters
- Capacity: 328 evacuees seated + 10 on stretchers
- Crew: 2

Petroleum exploitation companies operate a fleet of Ice Breaking Emergency Evacuation Vessels (IBEEV) on the Caspian Sea to service the extensive oil fields there. The vessels are designed to evacuate up to 338 individuals per trip. They are designed to function using compressed air to power their engines if they are passing through pools of burning oil or oxygen-poor environments—carrying enough compressed air to function for 50 minutes. Every evacuee is issued a rebreather for passing through anoxic environments if the airtight evacuation capsules are compromised. The vessels are insulated so passengers and crew can survive transiting through pools of burning oil. Since the Caspian freezes during winter, the vessels are designed to break up to 0.6 metres (2.0 ft) of ice.

The vessels were designed by AKAC Inc. and Robert Allan Limited, a firm of Canadian naval architects. Initially, in 2005, Remontowa built four vessels. By 2012 the fleet contained ten vessels.

There is provision to carry ten stretcher-bound, wounded evacuees, while the remaining 328 evacuees are seated in one of three evacuation capsules. Only two crewmembers are required to operate the vessels.
