= THV Galatea =

Destroyer tender launched in 2007

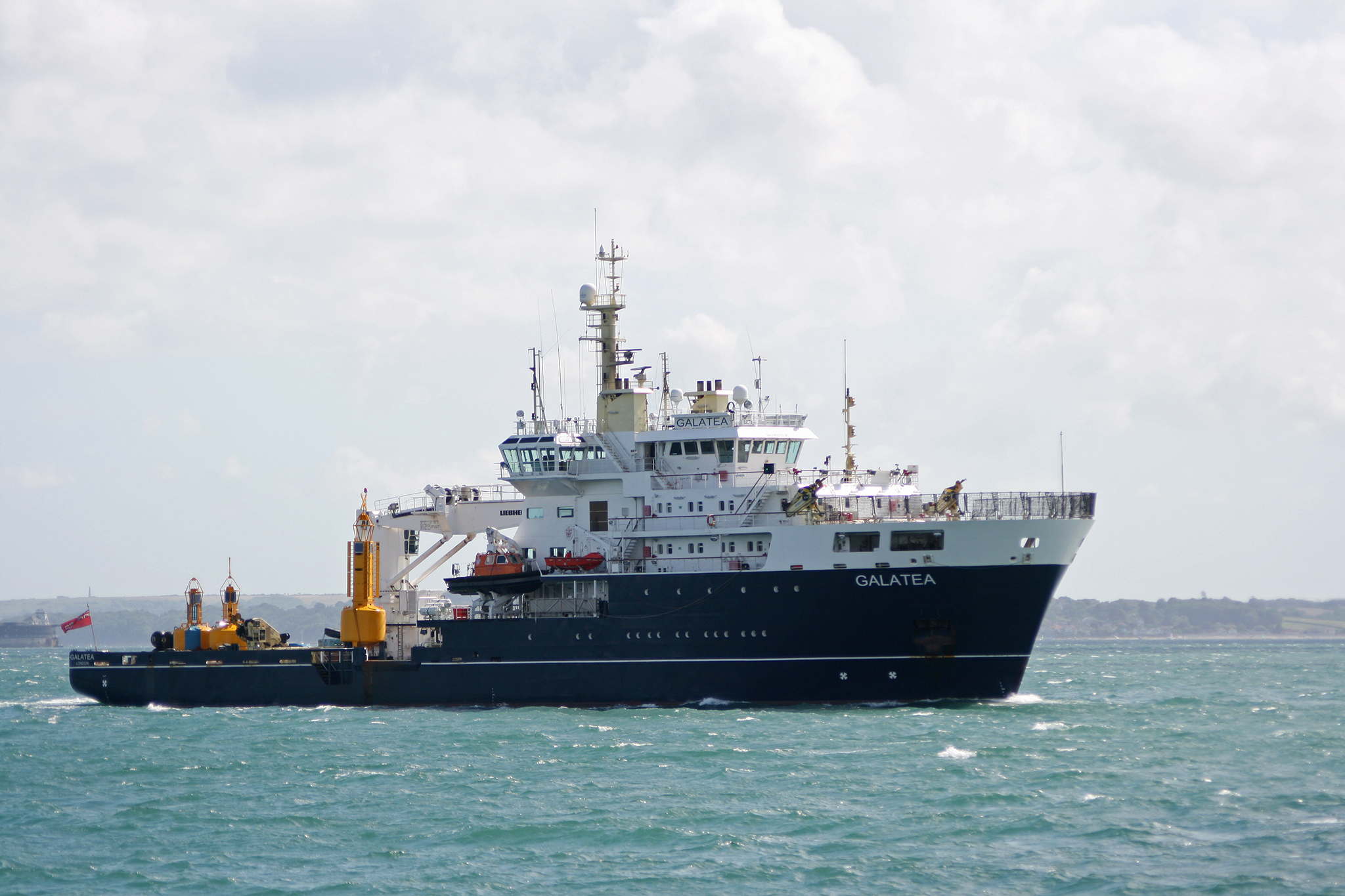

History

United Kingdom
- Name: Galatea
- Owner: Trinity House
- Operator: Trinity House
- Port of registry: London
- Ordered: 11 March 2004
- Builder: Remontowa, Gdańsk, Poland
- Laid down: 11 October 2005
- Launched: 26 July 2006 by Mrs Jane de Halpert, wife of Trinity House's Executive Chairman
- Christened: 17 October 2007, London
- Home port: Harwich
- Identification: IMO number: 9338591; MMSI number: 235054097; Callsign: MRDQ7
- Status: Active

General characteristics
- Class & type: Lloyd's + 100A1, +LMC, +UMS, CAS, DP(AA)
- Type: Multi-Function Tender
- Tonnage: 3,569 GT; 1,101 NT; 1,233 DWT tonnes
- Length: o/a: 84.20m BP: 75.00m
- Beam: 16.5 m
- Height: Air Draught 30 m
- Draught: 4.25 m
- Depth: to Main Deck: 7.20 m
- Installed power: 3 × Wärtsilä 8L20 (1,368 ekW); 2 × Wärtsilä 4L20 (684 ekW)
- Propulsion: Diesel-electric: Rolls-Royce Azimuth Propellers; Two Bow Thrusters
- Speed: 12.5 knots
- Endurance: 35 days
- Capacity: 30 cabins
- Complement: 8 Officers & 11 PO/Crew
- Aviation facilities: forward helicopter flight deck

THV Galatea is a lighthouse tender operated by Trinity House, the body responsible for the operation of lighthouses and marine navigation aids around the coasts of England, Wales and the Channel Islands.

== History ==
THV Galatea was launched in July 2006, replacing the THV Mermaid, in service with Trinity House since 1987. Mermaid was sold to the Gardline group of Great Yarmouth, for conversion to survey vessel. Galatea is a sister vessel to the NLV Pharos. The Queen and Prince Philip visited the Pool of London on 17 October 2007 for the naming of Galatea, moored alongside HMS Belfast.

This is the second Trinity House vessel named Galatea. The first, a paddle yacht built in 1868, served Trinity House until 1895. She was named in honour of HMS Galatea which had recently completed a round-the-world voyage under the command of Queen Victoria's second son, Captain the Duke of Edinburgh, who was Master of Trinity House at the time. Galatea attended the commissioning of Eddystone, Wolf and other lighthouses designed by Sir James Douglass. Galatea featured in the 2008 BBC Documentary Comedy, Three Men in a Boat, where Dara Ó Briain, Rory McGrath and Griff Rhys Jones used the vessel to get to the Scilly isles.

In Greek mythology, Galatea was a sea nymph who attended Poseidon (the god of the sea). She loved Acis, the shepherd son of Pan. However, Acis was killed by the jealous Cyclops Polyphemus and, with her heart broken, Galatea turned into a stream of water.

== Service ==
THV Galatea provides aids to navigation for the safe passage of mariners, including maintenance work, buoy deployment, wreck location marking and towing. She is also able to carry out additional tasks such as hydrographic surveying and wreck finding and contract commercial work. She is equipped for:

- hydrographic surveys including bathymetry, side scan, sonar and wreck investigations
- aids to navigation deployment, maintenance, repair and examination
- research platforms for deployment and recovery of scientific equipment
- sampling projects
- marine hazard search and marking
- lifting, towing and accurate positioning of marine equipment
- recovery and re-establishment of off-station aids to navigation
- sea trials of electronic and speciality equipment
- helicopter support
- safety boat assignments
- guard duties for cable and pipe laying projects
