= NLV Pharos =

Scottish lighthouse tender ship

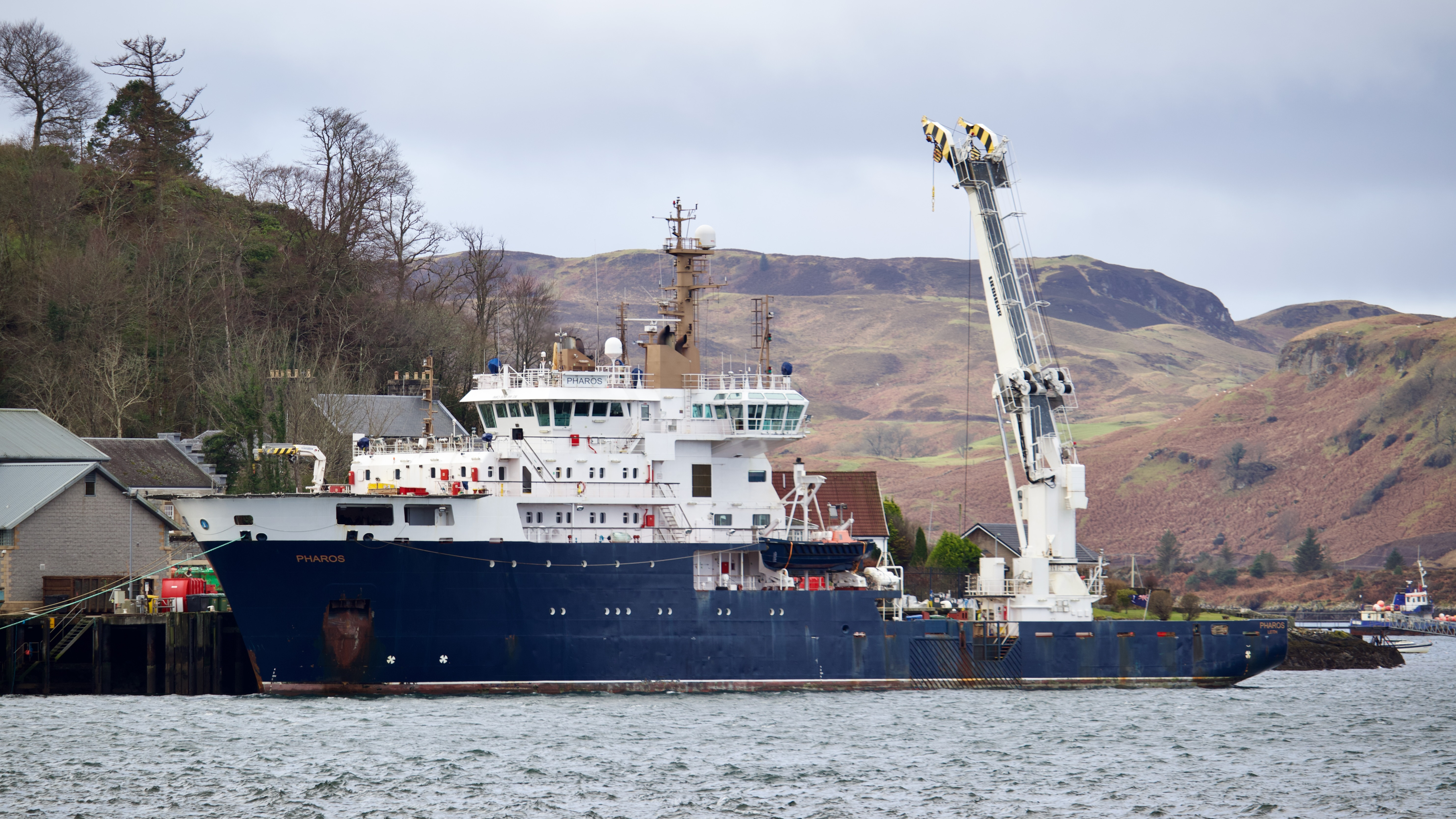
- NLV Pharos in Oban

History

United Kingdom
- Name: Pharos
- Namesake: Lighthouse of Alexandria
- Owner: Williams & Glyn's Leasing Company
- Operator: Northern Lighthouse Board
- Port of registry: Leith
- Awarded: 11 November 2004
- Builder: Remontowa, Gdańsk, Poland
- Launched: 3 February 2006
- Commissioned: 9 May 2007
- Home port: Oban
- Identification: IMO number: 9338606; MMSI number: 233185000; Call sign: GNLB

General characteristics
- Class & type: Lloyd's + 100A1, +LMC, +UMS, CAS, DP(AA)
- Tonnage: 3,569 GT; 1,101 NT; 1,233 DWT
- Length: o/a: 84.20 m (276 ft 3 in) BP: 75.00 m (246 ft 1 in)
- Beam: 16.5 m (54 ft 2 in)
- Height: Air Draught 30 m (98 ft 5 in)
- Draught: 4.25 m (13 ft 11 in)
- Depth: to Main Deck: 7.20 m (23 ft 7 in)
- Propulsion: Diesel-electric: Wärtsilä engines, 3 x 1370 ekW – 2 x 685 ekW; 2 x 1500 kW Rolls-Royce Azimuth propellers; Two bow thrusters
- Speed: 12.5 knots (23.2 km/h; 14.4 mph)
- Capacity: 30 cabins
- Complement: 7 officers & 11 PO/crew
- Aviation facilities: forward helicopter flight deck

NLV Pharos is a lighthouse tender operated by the Northern Lighthouse Board (NLB), the body responsible for the operation of lighthouses and marine navigation aids around the coasts of Scotland and the Isle of Man.

== History ==
Pharos and her sister ship, Galatea (2006) were built by Stocznia Remontowa, Gdańsk, Poland as part of a £38 million contract. Galatea serves the same role for Trinity House on the coast of England, Wales and the Channel Islands.

Pharos is the tenth NLB vessel to carry the name, replacing the ninth Pharos in March 2007. The first Pharos, which operated as a lighthouse vessel from 1799 to 1810, was a simple wooden sloop 15 metres (49 ft) long and 5.5 metres (18 ft) wide.

Pharos was the great lighthouse of Alexandria, one of the Seven Wonders of the Ancient World.

== Service ==
NLV Pharos is based in Oban and works mainly in Scottish and Manx waters, servicing over 200 automatic lighthouses, buoys and beacons. She is also able to carry out hydrographic surveying and wreck finding and other commercial work under contract.
