= Briggs Marine =

Marine services company based in the United Kingdom

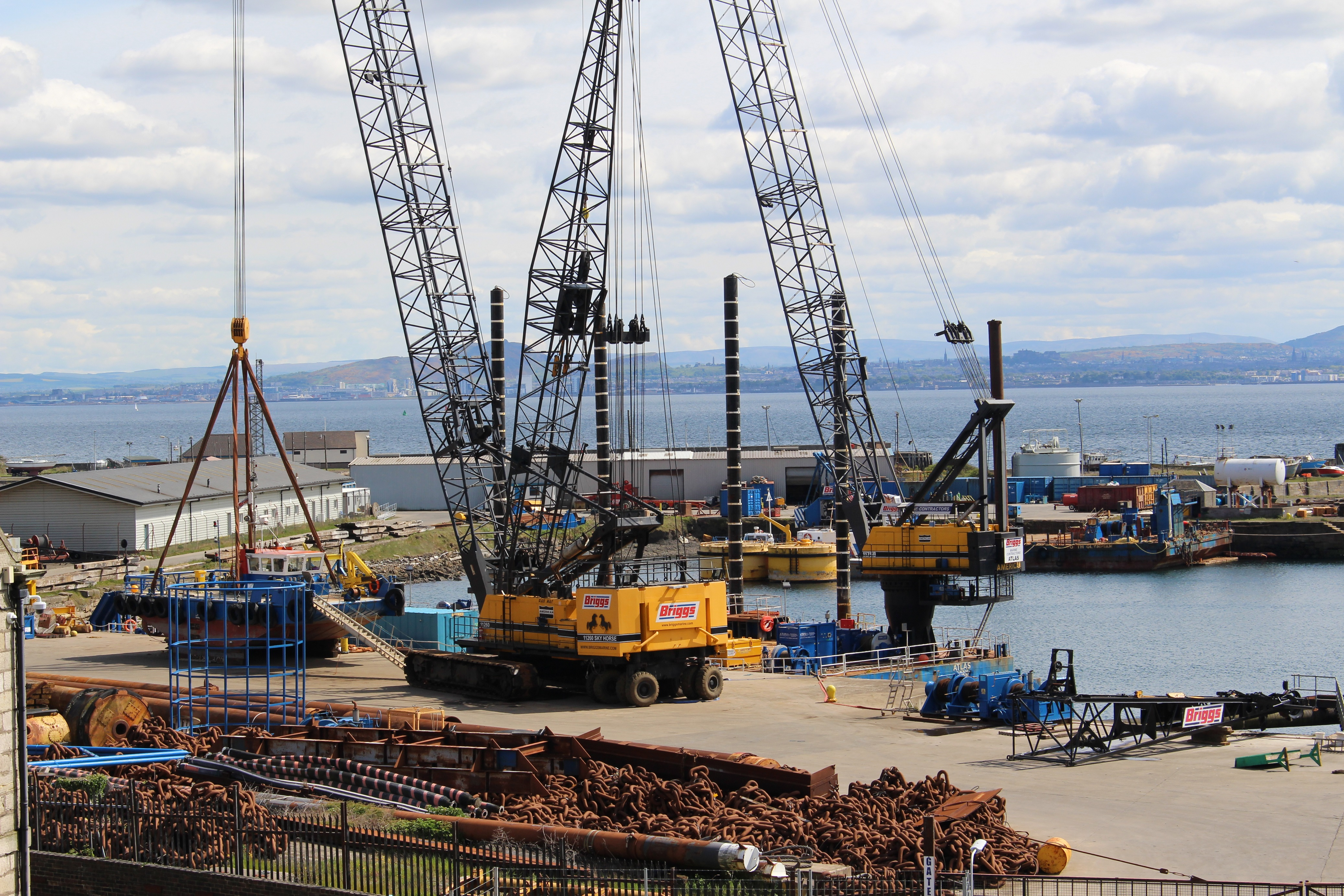
- Briggs Marine Yard, Burntisland Harbour
- Trade name: Briggs Commercial; Briggs Marine Contractors; Briggs Environmental
- Type: Private Limited Company
- Industry: Marine services
- Founded: 1972
- Headquarters: Burntisland, Scotland
- Number of employees: 774
- Website: www.briggsmarine.com

Briggs Marine is a marine services company based in the United Kingdom with operations throughout Europe, the Caspian Region and North America.

== History ==
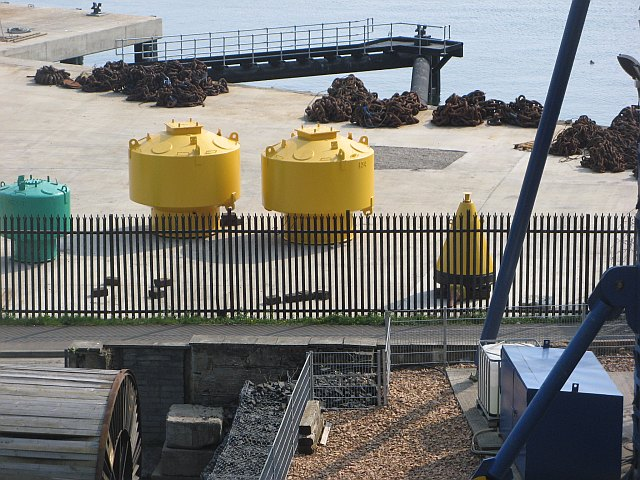
Buoys, Briggs Marine Contractors. Finished buoys, Burntisland Docks.

The Briggs Group became involved in the marine industry in the 1970s, providing workboats to marine construction works. By the 1980s, it was providing vessels and manpower for oil and gas terminal operations across the UK.

Since 2000, Briggs Group has moved into associated areas including subsea services, renewable energy services, moorings, environmental consultancy, survey work and diving services.

Briggs has held a contract with the Ministry of Defence since 2006 serving a single point mooring repair and maintenance in the Falkland Islands.

In 2007, the group agreed a 15-year, £100-million marine services support contract to provide navigation buoy maintenance and mooring support for the Royal Navy. To service the contract, Briggs Group commissioned the new MV Kingdom of Fife.

From 2012 until 2020, the company was contracted by Transport for London to manage the Woolwich Ferry operation on the River Thames. Briggs were involved in replacing the existing ferries with new vessels, which were constructed in Poland. They use a new mooring system installed at Woolwich and North Woolwich piers. Additionally, Briggs are managing the infrastructure upgrades required to berth and operate the new ferries. The new vessels entered service on 1 February 2019.

The commercial diving service was introduced in 2015, initially to support the company's marine projects particularly submarine cables, however, it now operates as an independent part of the business.

In 2016 Briggs contracted with Peel Ports to provide pilot transport in the Port of Liverpool.

In 2018 Briggs Marine was given a three-year contract by BP exploration worth over $4 million to provide fire and rescue services at Sangachal Terminal in Azerbaijan.

== Fleet ==
Vessel Name	Category	Year built
Kingdom of Fife	Anchor Handling Vessel; Tug	2008 - Damen Shipyards
Cameron	Multicat	1991
Forth Boxer	Multicat	1995
Forth Constructor	Multicat	1994 - James W Cook & Co
Forth Fighter	Multicat	1985 - Penryn Plant & Marine (refit in 2002)
Forth Linesman	Multicat	2008 - Meercat Workboats
Forth Sentinel	Multicat	1991
Forth Trojan	Multicat	1994 - Damen Shipyards
Forth Umpire	Multicat	1997 - Ian C Darley
Forth Drummer	Tug	1965 - Richards Shipbuilders
Forth Atlas	Crane Barge	1959 (modified 2008)
Harry McGill	Crane Barge	
Forth Guardsman	Self-Propelled Barge	1983 - Japan
Forth Piper	Pontoon	1976 - Amsterdam
Forth Quarrier	Pontoon	1983 - Singapore
Sprucelight	Pontoon	1992
Forth Mariner	Workboat	
Humber Guardian	Survey Vessel	2010 - Mustang Marine
Mersey Guardian	Survey Vessel	2012 - Mustang Marine
Solent Guardian	Survey Vessel	2013 - Mustang Marine
Severn Guardian	Survey Vessel	2012 - Mustang Marine
Thames Guardian	Survey Vessel	2011 - Alnmaritec
Forth Reclaimer	Backhoe Dredger	2012
Forth Warrior	Multicat	2016
Forth Jouster	Multicat	2007
