= Lighthouse tender =

Boat for maintaining and supplying large maritime navigation beacons

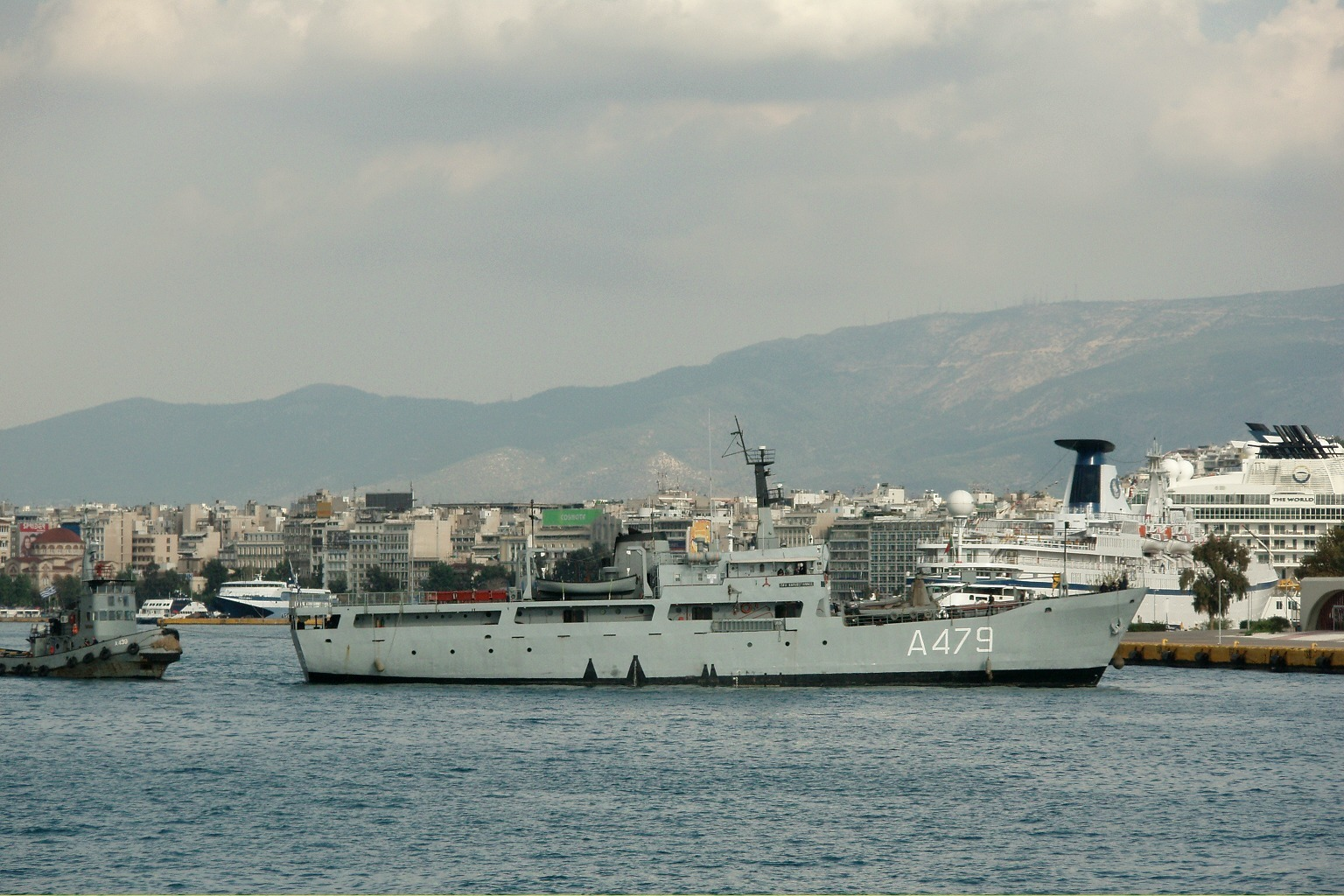
Hellenic Navy lighthouse tender HS Karavogiannos, A-479.

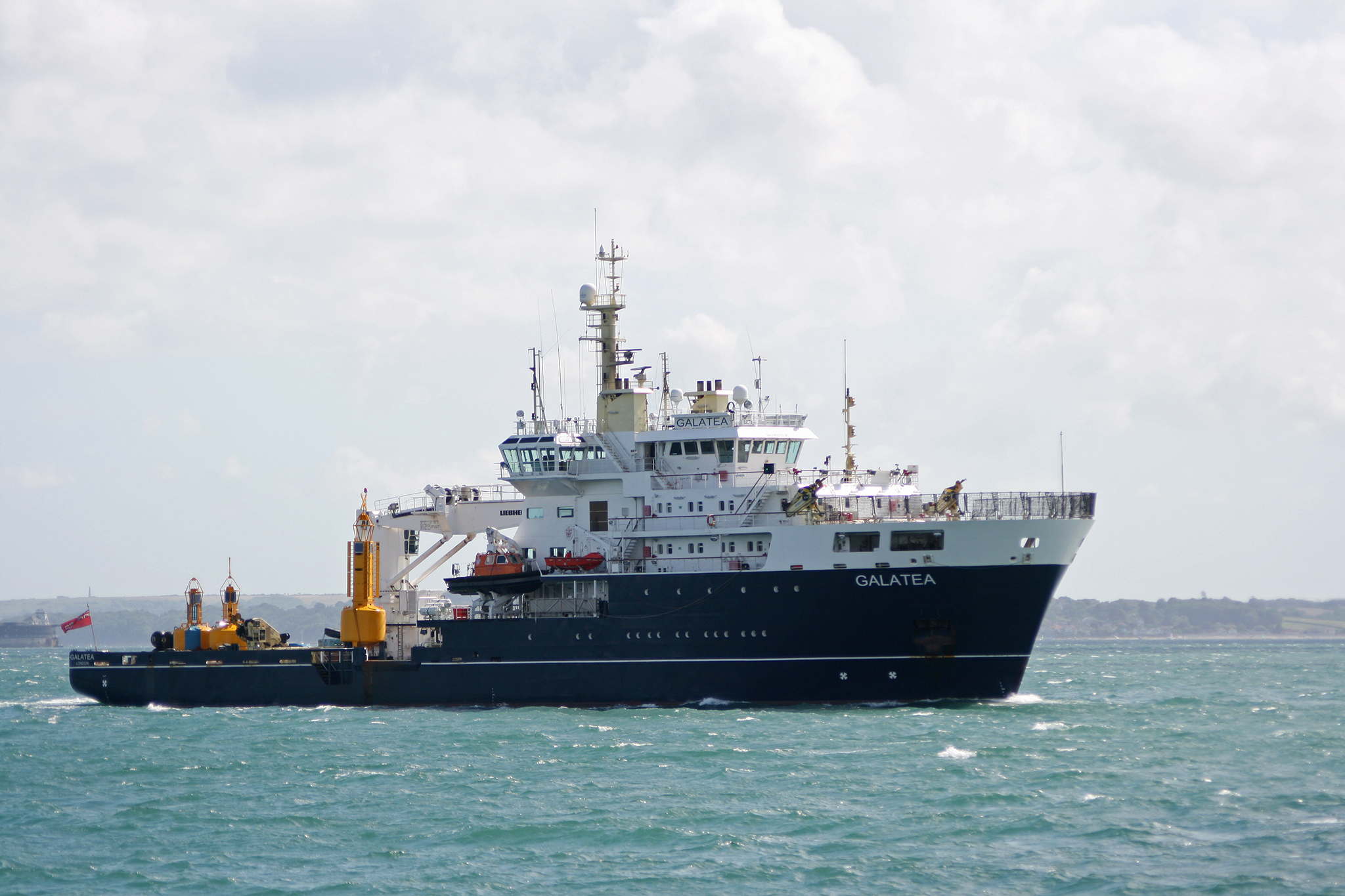
THV Galatea, a lighthouse tender operated by Trinity House.

A lighthouse tender is a ship specifically designed to maintain, support, or tend to lighthouses or lightvessels, providing supplies, fuel, mail, and transportation. The work is often carried out by ships which also act as buoy tenders.

In the United States, these ships originally served as part of the Lighthouse Service and now are part of the Coast Guard. The first American tender of the Lighthouse Service was former revenue cutter Rushnourder, which was acquired in 1840. The first steam tender was the Shubrick, completed in 1857 and put into service on the West Coast in 1858. The Fir was the last active representative of the service, and is now a US National Historic Landmark.

== See also ==
- List of lighthouse tenders by country
- Ponza-class transport ship – classified as "Motion Transport Lighthouses" ships
- Navigational aid
- Trinity House
- Northern Lighthouse Board
