= Decoration for Officers of the Royal Naval Volunteer Reserve =

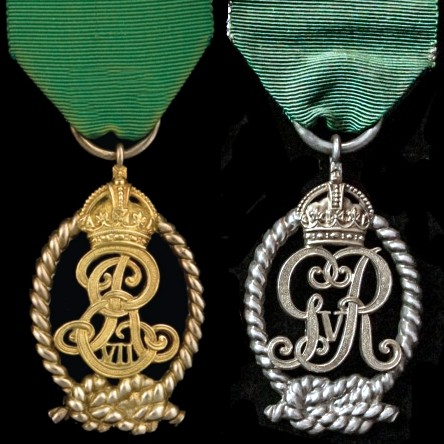
- King Edward VII and first King George V versions with original all-green ribbons
- Type: Military long service decoration
- Awarded for: Twenty years service
- Country: United Kingdom
- Presented by: the Monarch of the United Kingdom and the British Dominions, and Emperor of India
- Eligibility: Part-time commissioned officers of the Royal Naval Volunteer Reserve
- Post-nominals: VD until c. 1947; VRD from c. 1947
- Clasps: Ten years additional service
- Status: Still current in New Zealand
- Established: 1908
- Final award: 1966
- Original and post-1919 ribbon bars

Order of wear
- Next (higher): Decoration for Officers of the Royal Naval Reserve
- Next (lower): Royal Naval Reserve Long Service and Good Conduct Medal

The Decoration for Officers of the Royal Naval Volunteer Reserve, post-nominal letters VD until c. 1947 and VRD thereafter, was instituted in 1908. It could be awarded to part-time commissioned officers in the United Kingdom's Royal Naval Volunteer Reserve after twenty years of service as efficient and thoroughly capable officers. The decoration was a Naval version of the Volunteer Officers' Decoration and its successor, the Territorial Decoration.

The decoration could also be awarded to part-time commissioned officers in the Naval Volunteer Reserves of Colonial Auxiliary Forces throughout the British Empire.

The award of the decoration was discontinued in the United Kingdom in 1966, when the Royal Naval Volunteer Reserve, composed of civilian volunteers, was merged with the Royal Naval Reserve, composed of Merchant Navy seamen. It was superseded by its identical sister decoration, the Decoration for Officers of the Royal Naval Reserve.

The New Zealand version, the Royal New Zealand Naval Volunteer Reserve Decoration, is still being awarded.

== Origins ==
In 1892, the Volunteer Officers' Decoration was instituted as an award for long and meritorious service by officers of the United Kingdom's Volunteer Force. In 1894, the grant of the decoration was extended by Royal Warrant to commissioned officers of volunteer forces throughout the British Empire and a separate new decoration was instituted, the Volunteer Officers' Decoration for India and the Colonies.

In 1899, the Volunteer Officers' Decoration for India and the Colonies was superseded by the Colonial Auxiliary Forces Officers' Decoration, for award to part-time commissioned officers of the Dominion of Canada and the British Colonies, Dependencies and Protectorates.

On 17 August 1908, the Volunteer Officers' Decoration was superseded in the United Kingdom by the Territorial Decoration. Prior to the institution of this new decoration, a pair of distinctive Naval decorations had been instituted specifically to reward long and meritorious service by part-time officers of the Royal Naval Reserve, composed of Merchant Navy seamen, and the Royal Naval Volunteer Reserve, composed of civilian volunteers.

== Institution ==
The Decoration for Officers of the Royal Naval Volunteer Reserve, often colloquially and even officially referred to as either the Royal Naval Volunteer Reserve Officers' Decoration or the Royal Naval Volunteer Reserve Decoration, was instituted before 17 August 1908 as a long service award for part-time officers of the Royal Naval Volunteer Reserves of the United Kingdom and the British Dominions, Colonies and India.

It was one of a pair of decorations which were instituted simultaneously, the other being the Decoration for Officers of the Royal Naval Reserve, often referred to as either the Royal Naval Reserve Officers' Decoration or the Royal Naval Reserve Decoration. The badges of these two decorations are identical and both initially hung from the same all-green ribbon, until a new ribbon was introduced for the Decoration for Officers of the Royal Naval Volunteer Reserve in 1919.

The decoration was also awarded by several countries in the British Empire.

- South Africa adopted it in 1915, two years after the South African Division of the Royal Naval Volunteer Reserve was established on 1 July 1913.
- New Zealand adopted it in 1925 when the Royal Naval Volunteer Reserve (New Zealand) was established.
- Canada adopted it as the Royal Canadian Naval Volunteer Reserve Officers' Decoration in 1938, when the Royal Canadian Navy Volunteer Reserve was stablished.

Until c. 1947, recipients were entitled to use the post-nominal letters VD, the same as those for the Volunteer Officers' Decoration and the Colonial Auxiliary Forces Officers' Decoration, approved by Royal Warrants dated 9 May 1925. The post-nominal letters were changed to VRD c. 1947.

The decoration was first awarded to Lieutenant Charles Alfred Jones on 9 November 1909.

== Award criteria ==
The decoration could be awarded to part-time Royal Naval Volunteer Reserve officers after twenty years of commissioned service, not necessarily continuous, as an efficient and thoroughly capable officer. Wartime service counted as double time, while half of the time served as a rating or in the ranks could be reckoned as qualifying service for the decoration. In any event, a minimum of seven years had to have been served in the Royal Naval Volunteer Reserve in any capacity before becoming eligible for the award of the decoration.

An Officer who had previously been awarded the Royal Naval Volunteer Reserve Long Service and Good Conduct Medal for service as a rating, could subsequently be awarded the decoration and still wear the medal, provided both periods of qualifying service had been completed.

Officers serving on the active list on or after 1 June 1954, became eligible for the award of a clasp to the decoration after completing ten years of additional reckonable service, provided that no service could under any circumstances count double for the assessment of the additional ten years.

== Description ==
The decoration is an oval skeletal design and was struck in silver, with parts of the obverse in silver-gilt. The badge is 56 millimetres (2.20 inches) high to the top of the crown and 35 millimetres (1.38 inches) wide. It has a 12 millimetres (0.47 inches) diameter ring suspender, formed of silver wire, which is attached to a small ring affixed to the top back of the decoration.

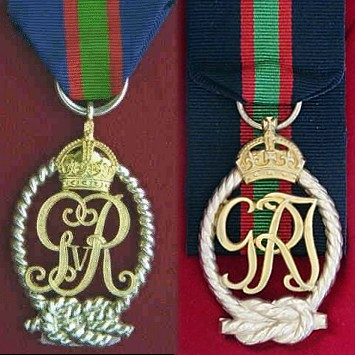
First and second King George V versions

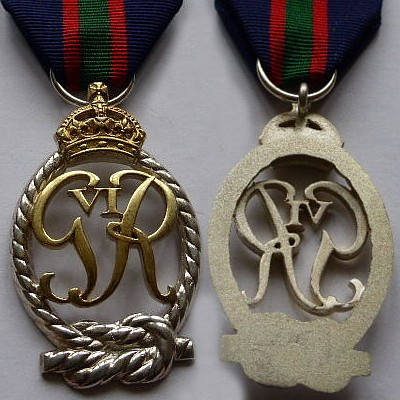
King George VI version

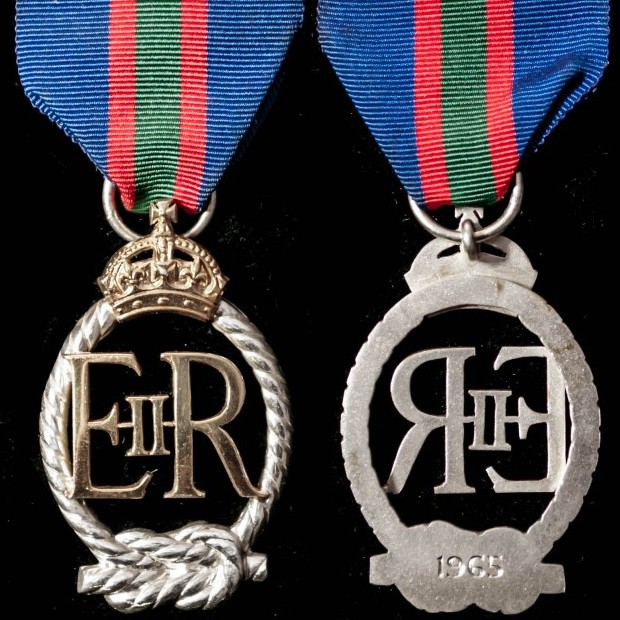
Queen Elizabeth II version

Obverse

The obverse has the royal cypher of the reigning monarch in silver-gilt, surrounded by a silver rope tied with a reef knot at the base and surmounted by a silver-gilt crown, which acts as the ribbon suspension. Five versions of the decoration have been awarded.

- The centre of the decoration's original version of 1908 has the Royal Cypher "ERVII" of King Edward VII, for "Edwardvs Rex VII", with the reef knot "facing" left.
- The first King George V version, with his Royal Cypher "GVR" for "Georgivs V Rex", was introduced after his succession to the throne in 1910. This version also has the reef knot "facing" left.
- The second King George V version has his Royal Cypher "GRI" for "Georgivs Rex Imperator". This version has the reef knot "facing" right.
- The King George VI version, with his Royal Cypher "GVIR" for "Georgivs VI Rex", was introduced after his succession to the throne in 1936. This version also has the reef knot "facing" right.
- The Queen Elizabeth II version, with her Royal Cypher "EIIR" for "Elizabeth II Regina", was introduced after her succession to the throne in 1952. This version also has the reef knot "facing" right.

Reverse

The reverse is smooth and undecorated, usually with the year during which the decoration was awarded impressed on the back of the reef knot on decorations awarded in the United Kingdom, or engraved named to the recipient in other countries.

Clasp

The clasp, which was introduced c. 1954, has the Royal Cypher of Queen Elizabeth II (EIIR) in the centre, surmounted by the Royal Crown, with the year of the award impressed on the reverse. In undress uniform, a recipient of a clasp would wear a silver rosette on the ribbon bar.

Ribbons

Two ribbons were used with the decoration.

- The original ribbon was 38 millimetres wide and dark green. It is identical to the ribbon of the Volunteer Officers' Decoration.
- A new ribbon was introduced c. 1919, 38 millimetres wide, with a 12 millimetres wide Navy blue band and a 4 millimetres wide dark red band, repeated in reverse order and separated by a 6 millimetres wide dark green band. The ribbon colours are symbolic, with the blue representing the sea, the red the Royal crimson and the green the original Volunteer Officers' Decoration ribbon colour.

== Order of wear ==
In the order of wear prescribed by the British Central Chancery of the Orders of Knighthood, the Decoration for Officers of the Royal Naval Volunteer Reserve takes precedence after the Decoration for Officers of the Royal Naval Reserve and before the Royal Naval Reserve Long Service and Good Conduct Medal.

=== South Africa ===
On 6 April 1952 the Union of South Africa instituted its own range of military decorations and medals. These new awards were worn before all earlier British decorations and medals awarded to South Africans, with the exception of the Victoria Cross, which still took precedence before all other awards. Of the official British medals applicable to South Africans, the Decoration for Officers of the Royal Naval Volunteer Reserve takes precedence as shown.

- Preceded by the Efficiency Medal (South Africa).
- Succeeded by the Royal Naval Volunteer Reserve Long Service and Good Conduct Medal.

== Discontinuation ==
New Zealand continues to award the Royal New Zealand Naval Volunteer Reserve Decoration, for fifteen years of service. In the United Kingdom and some countries of the Commonwealth, the decoration was gradually superseded by new decorations.

- On 1 January 1946, Canada was the first to discontinue the award of the Royal Canadian Navy Volunteer Reserve Officers' Decoration, upon the amalgamation of the Royal Canadian Navy Volunteer Reserve and the Royal Canadian Navy Reserve. The decoration was superseded by the Royal Canadian Navy (Reserve) Decoration.
- In South Africa, the Decoration for Officers of the Royal Naval Volunteer Reserve was superseded on 6 April 1952 by the John Chard Decoration, which could be awarded to all ranks of the Citizen Force and all Arms of the Service for twenty years of efficient service and good conduct.
- In the United Kingdom, the decoration and its equivalent award for part-time volunteer Naval ratings, the Royal Naval Volunteer Reserve Long Service and Good Conduct Medal, were discontinued in 1966, when the Royal Naval Volunteer Reserve was merged with the Royal Naval Reserve. The decoration was superseded by its identical sister decoration, the Decoration for Officers of the Royal Naval Reserve.
