= Daphne Mayo =

Australian sculptor (1895–1982)

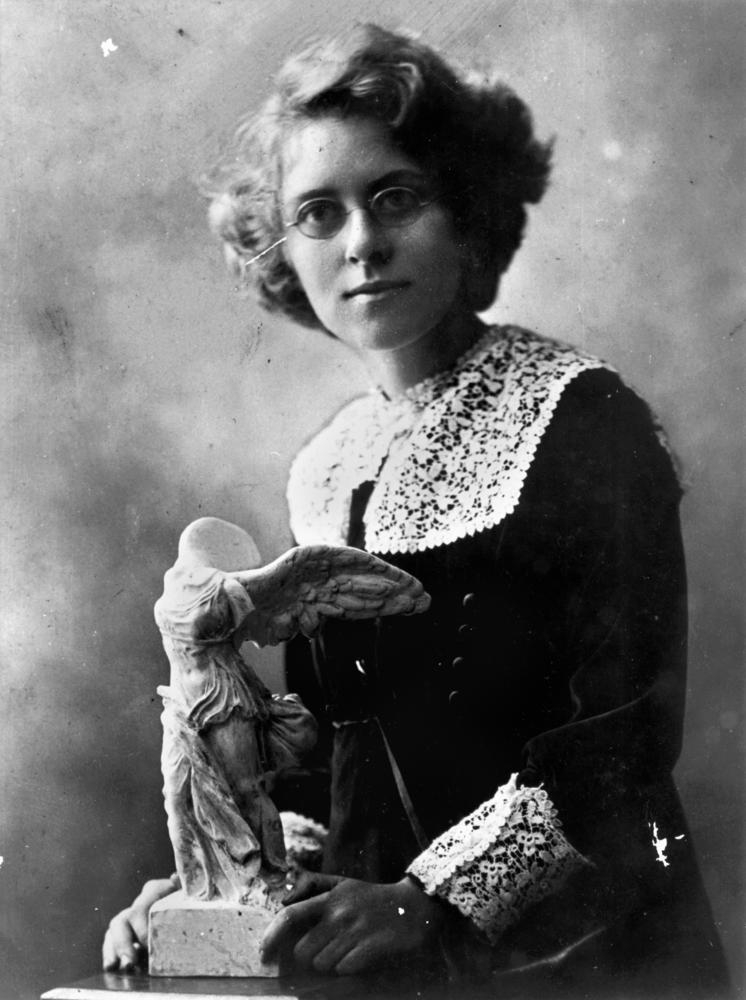
- Born: Lilian Daphne Mayo; 1 October 1895; Sydney, New South Wales, Australia
- Died: 31 July 1982 (aged 86); Brisbane, Queensland, Australia
- Known for: Public sculptures
- Parent(s): Lila Mary; William McArthur Mayo

Lilian Daphne Mayo MBE (1 October 1895 – 31 July 1982) was an Australian artist, most prominently known for her work in sculpture, particularly the tympanum of Brisbane City Hall and the Women's War Memorial in ANZAC Square.

== Personal life ==
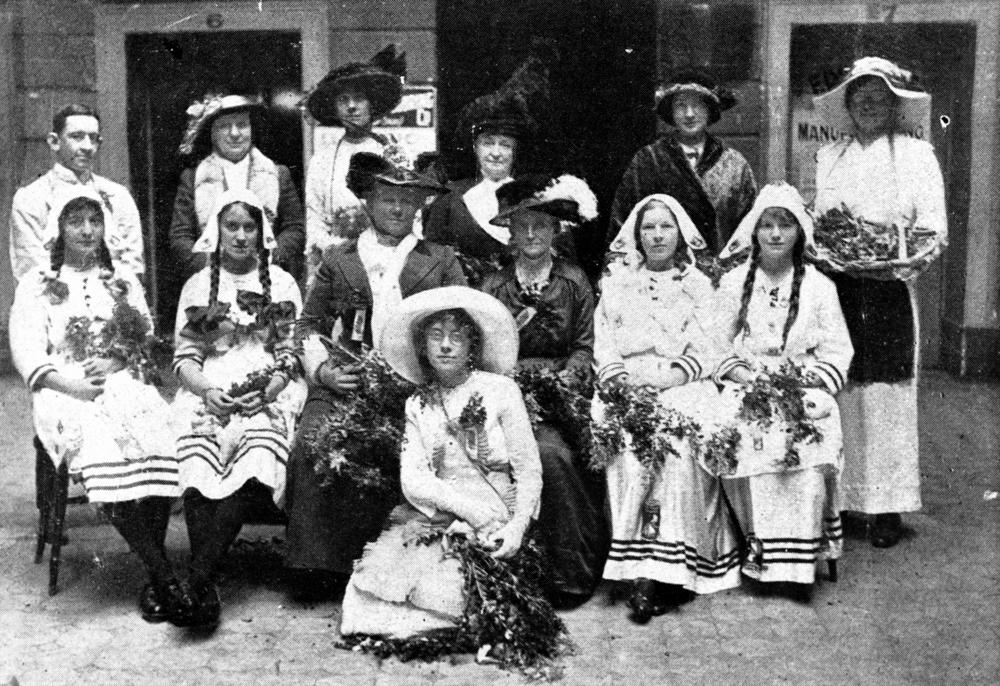
Mayo (seated front and centre), Wattle Day celebrations, Brisbane, 1914

Born in Balmain, Sydney, in 1895, Mayo was educated in Brisbane at St Margaret's Anglican Girls School and received a Diploma in Art Craftsmanship from the Brisbane Central Technical College in 1913. At the college she was strongly influenced by L. J. Harvey, who initiated her interest in modelling. She further developed her skills in this medium when she was presented with an opportunity to go to London in 1919 through an art scholarship provided by Queensland Wattle League. There she took a position as an assistant sculptor before her acceptance into the sculpture school of the Royal Academy.

== Prominent works ==
Despite her small frame, Mayo produced many physically demanding works which were carved in situ. On her return to Brisbane in 1925, she created a number of local works including:

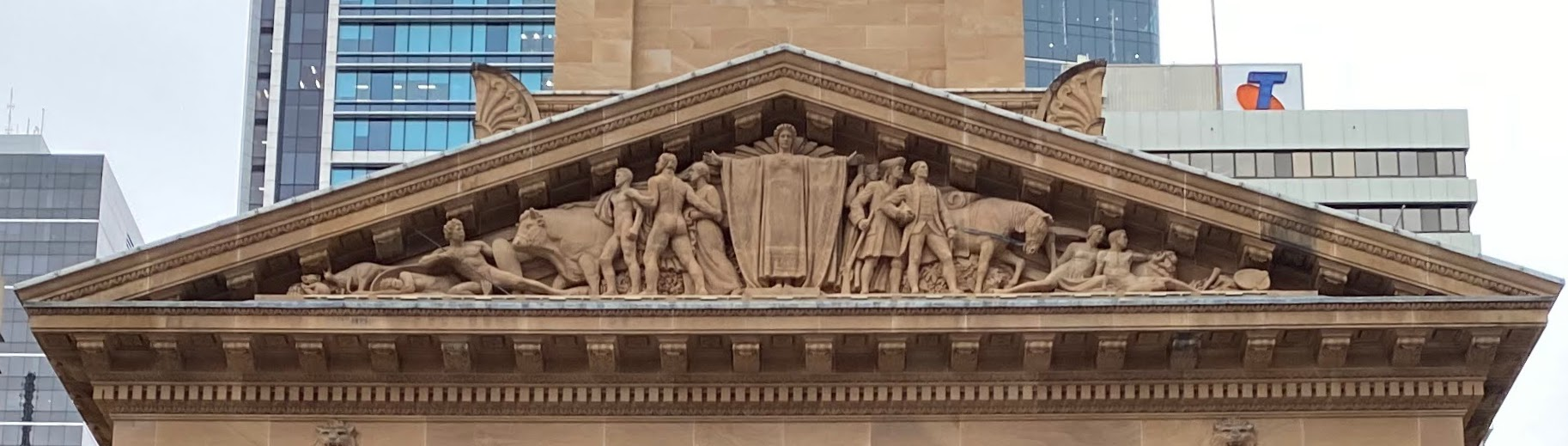
Brisbane City Hall tympanum

- The Brisbane City Hall tympanum (1927–30). The tympanum represents a relief of early settlement entitled "The progress of civilisation in the State of Queensland". This sculpture has been considered one of the most important Brisbane sculpture commissions ever awarded. In 1953, Mayo described the artwork as a depiction of white colonialist supremacy: "Of course the figures show the retreat of the Aborigine. Isn't it true? As a civilisation, they simply couldn't stand up to ours." Many Indigenous leaders have criticised the sculptures and have called for their removal.
- The Queensland Women's War Memorial (1929–32) located in Brisbane's Anzac Square is a sandstone relief of a military procession. The first war memorial depicting servicewomen, this piece highlights the important contribution made by women to the tradition of war memorials. The Brisbane Women's Club conceived the idea of the Queensland Women's War Memorial in 1929 at the outset of the Depression. A campaign was launched to raise a thousand pounds for the memorial but as insufficient funds were raised the original concept of a panel cast in bronze and a cascading fountain was changed to a carved stone panel and water fountain.

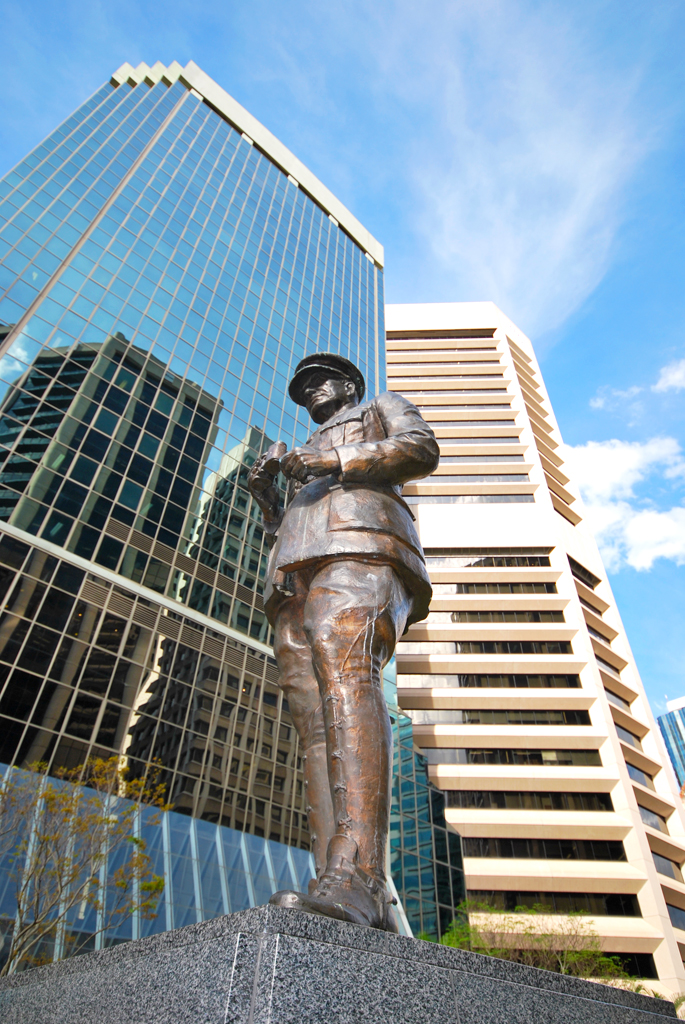
Statue of Major General Sir William Glasgow

- The Sir William Glasgow Memorial (1961–64); this naturalistic bronze figure statue was added to the Queensland Heritage Register in 2004.
- Tympanum at Holy Spirit Church, New Farm

== Public service ==
Mayo was Vice-President of the Royal Queensland Art Society from 1927 to 1930 and was made a life member.

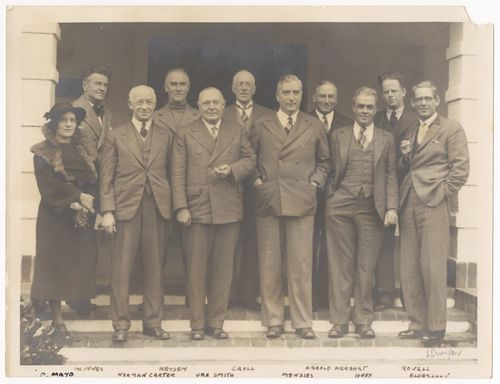
Les Dwyer (1937). Foundation members of the Australian Academy of Art, Canberra, 19 Jun 1937. Back row, left to right: McInnes, Heysen, Croll, Harold Herbert, Rowell. Front row, left to right: D. Mayo, Norman Carter, Ure Smith, Menzies, Hoff, Eldershaw. Daphne Mayo Collection, University of Queensland

In 1937, Mayo became an invited foundation member of, and exhibited with, Robert Menzies' anti-modernist organisation the Australian Academy of Art. She lobbied successfully on numerous occasions for funding for the fledgling Queensland Art Gallery, established with painter colleague Vida Lahey an art reference library at the University of Queensland in 1936, was a trustee of the Queensland Art Gallery (1960–67) and left her private papers to the University of Queensland's Fryer Library.

For campaigning vigorously for the arts in Queensland during this time she was awarded the Society of Artists' medal in 1938 and MBE in 1959.

== Legacy ==
The Daphne Mayo Visiting Professorship in Visual Culture The School of English, Media Studies and Art History at The University of Queensland established the annual Daphne Mayo Visiting Professorship in Visual Culture, featuring each year, a major world figure to visit Brisbane to speak about the latest trends, influences, and theories in their area of visual culture, and to give public lectures and take master classes with postgraduate students at The University of Queensland.

The Annual Daphne Mayo Lecture is presented by the University Art Museum and the School of English, Media Studies and Art History, in association with the Alumni Association of the University of Queensland Inc and is dedicated to a leading Australian advocate of the visual arts. There is also an artists society named after her, the Friends of Daphne Mayo.

The University of Queensland Fryer Library holds the Daphne Mayo manuscript collection, comprising correspondence, newspaper clippings, art exhibition catalogues, tools, art works, photographs, notebooks, diaries.

== See also ==
- List of sculptors
