= Decoration for Officers of the Royal Naval Reserve =

Medal

Decoration for Officers of the Royal Naval Reserve (Reserve Decoration)
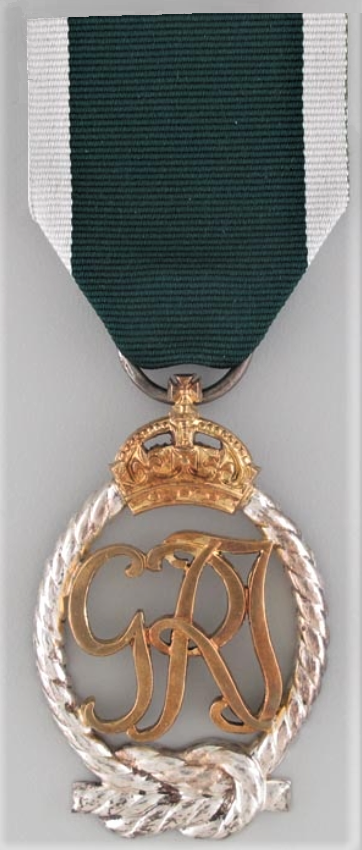
- King George VI version, 1937-47
- Type: Long service medal
- Awarded for: At least fifteen years of active service
- Presented by: the United Kingdom Royal Navy Reserve
- Eligibility: Officers of the Royal Navy Reserve
- Post-nominals: R.D.
- Status: Superseded by the Volunteer Reserves Service Medal
- Established: 1908
- Final award: 1999
- Ribbon bar from 1941

Precedence
- Next (higher): Special Reserve Long Service and Good Conduct Medal
- Equivalent: Territorial Decoration; Efficiency Decoration; Air Efficiency Award
- Next (lower): Decoration for Officers of the Royal Naval Volunteer Reserve

The Decoration for Officers of the Royal Naval Reserve, commonly known as the Reserve Decoration (RD) was a medal awarded to officers with at least fifteen years service in the Royal Naval Reserve (RNR) of the United Kingdom. The medal was instituted in 1908.

== Design and eligibility ==
The medal consists of the cypher of the reigning monarch in silver gilt surrounded by an oval silver cable tied with a reef knot at the base and surmounted by a gilt crown. The reverse is plain, with later issues often engraved with the year of award. The ribbon, suspended from a ring, was dark green until October 1941, and green edged white thereafter.

To qualify, fifteen years' service was required (not counting service as a midshipman), with wartime service counting double. Clasps to the Reserve Decoration were awarded to recognise further periods of 15 years' service after the first award. When just the ribbon of the Decoration was worn, each clasp was indicated by a silver 'rosette' on the ribbon.

The Royal Naval Volunteer Reserve Decoration was of the same design as the Reserve Decoration but was distinguished, from 1919, by a different ribbon. In 1966 the Royal Naval Reserve (drawn from the Merchant Navy) and the Royal Naval Volunteer Reserve (civilian volunteers) were merged. Thereafter awards of the Royal Naval Volunteer Reserve Decoration were discontinued, with all reserve Royal Naval officers eligible for the Reserve Decoration.

The Reserve Decoration and the Royal Naval Reserve Long Service and Good Conduct Medal for RNR ratings were both replaced by a combined-services Volunteer Reserves Service Medal on 1 April 1999.
