= William Glasgow (general) =

Australian Army officer and politician (1876–1955)

Major General The Honourable Sir William Glasgow KCB, CMG, DSO, VD
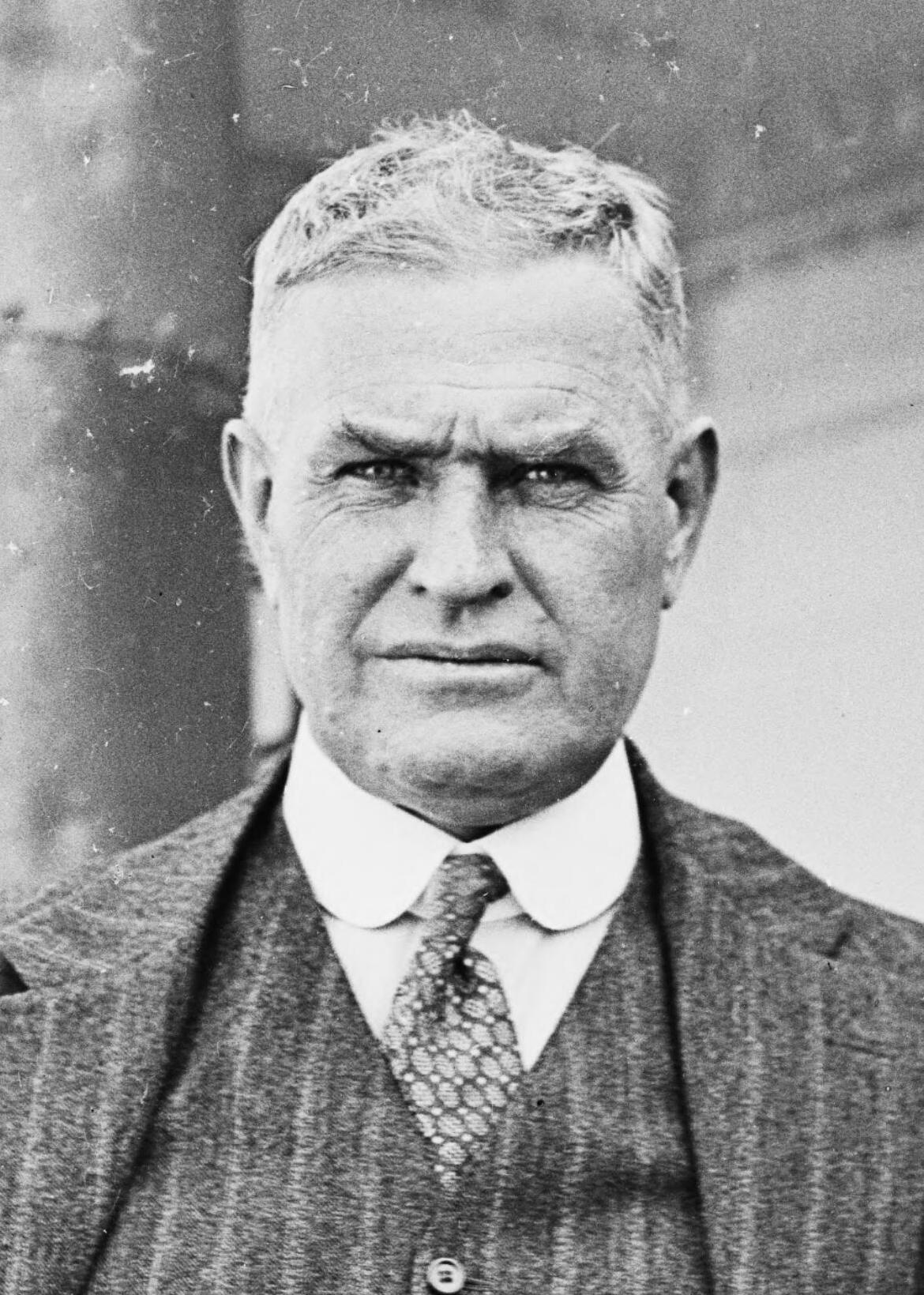
- Glasgow in 1930

Australian High Commissioner to Canada
- In office December 1939 – February 1945
- Preceded by: None
- Succeeded by: Alfred Stirling

Minister for Defence
- In office 2 April 1927 – 22 October 1929
- Preceded by: Sir Neville Howse
- Succeeded by: Albert Green

Minister for Home and Territories
- In office 18 June 1926 – 2 April 1927
- Preceded by: George Pearce
- Succeeded by: Charles Marr

Senator for Queensland
- In office 1 July 1920 – 30 June 1932

Personal details
- Born: 6 June 1876 Tiaro, Queensland, Australia
- Died: 4 July 1955 (aged 79) Brisbane, Queensland, Australia
- Party: Nationalist (to 1931); UAP (from 1931)
- Spouse: Annie Stumm (m. 1904)
- Relations: Jacob Stumm (father-in-law)
- Profession: Army officer, politician

Military service
- Allegiance: Colony of Queensland; Australia
- Branch/service: Queensland Defence Force; Australian Army
- Years of service: 1897–c.1920s
- Rank: Major General
- Commands: 4th Division (1921); 1st Division (1918–19); 13th Brigade (1916–18); 2nd Light Horse Regiment (1915–16)
- Battles/wars: Second Boer War; First World War; Gallipoli campaign; Western Front; Battle of Amiens; Second Battle of the Somme; Battle of the Hindenburg Line
- Awards: Knight Commander of the Order of the Bath; Companion of the Order of St Michael and St George; Distinguished Service Order; Mentioned in Despatches (10); Légion d'Honneur (France); Croix de Guerre (France); Croix de Guerre (Belgium)

Major General Sir Thomas William Glasgow KCB, CMG, DSO, VD (6 June 1876 – 4 July 1955) was a senior Australian Army officer and politician. Glasgow rose to prominence during the First World War as a brigade and later divisional commander on the Western Front. Post-war, he was elected to the Australian Senate, representing Queensland as a Nationalist Party member from 1919 to 1931, before appointment as Australian High Commissioner to Canada. In 1945, Glasgow returned to Australia and resumed his private business interests. He died in Brisbane in 1955, at the age of 79.

== Early life ==
Thomas William Glasgow was born on 6 June 1876 at Tiaro, near Maryborough, Queensland. He was the fourth child of Mary (née Anderson) and Samuel Glasgow. His father was a farmer of Ulster Scots origin. Glasgow undertook his schooling at One Mile State School in Gympie, Queensland, and then later at Maryborough Grammar School. Upon completion of his schooling, Glasgow worked as a junior clerk for a mining company in Gympie, before moving to the Queensland National Bank, in the same town, also in a clerical role.

== Boer War and early military career ==
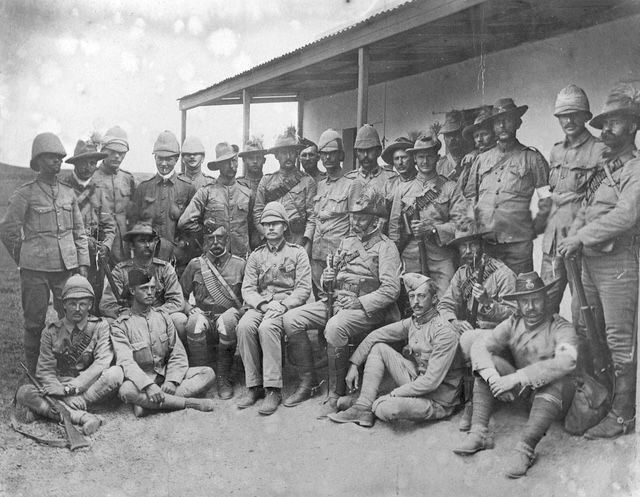
British and Australian officers during the Boer War. Glasgow is the officer standing sixth from the right

Glasgow joined the Wide Bay Regiment of the Queensland Mounted Infantry in 1893, and he was sent to London in 1897 as part of a small contingent of 20 personnel from Queensland to attend the Diamond Jubilee of Queen Victoria. In 1899, he volunteered for service in South Africa and was commissioned as a lieutenant, assigned to the 1st Queensland Mounted Infantry Contingent. While in South Africa, he took part in the relief of Kimberley, the fighting on the Modder, and the occupation of Bloemfontein. For his services, he was mentioned in despatches and awarded the Distinguished Service Order (DSO) in 1901.

After returning to Australia, Glasgow went into business with his younger brother Alexander, and together they operated their father's grocery store in Gympie. Glasgow married Annie Isabel Stumm, on 21 April 1904; her father, Jacob, was the Federal member for Lilley. Later, Glasgow became a pastoralist after purchasing a cattle station in central Queensland.

Glasgow remained in the militia, and in 1903, he raised a unit at Gympie, which was designated as the 13th Light Horse Regiment. On 6 May 1912, Glasgow was promoted to captain. Another promotion came on 6 May 1912 when he received his majority. When war broke out in 1914, he volunteered to join the Australian Imperial Force. Keeping his rank, he was appointed as second-in-command of the 2nd Light Horse Regiment, on 19 August. On 24 September 1914, Glasgow embarked for the Middle East, arriving in Egypt where the light horsemen undertook training until they were transferred Anzac Cove in a dismounted role, to reinforce the infantry that had landed there in April 1915.

== First World War ==
After the arrival of the light horsemen at Anzac in mid-May 1915, the commander of the 1st Light Horse Brigade, Colonel Harry Chauvel, assumed control of Monash Valley. Following a reorganisation of the defences at Pope's Hill, Glasgow became second-in-command to the commander of the 3rd Light Horse Regiment, Lieutenant Colonel Frank Rowell. While troops from the 1st, 2nd and 3rd Light Horse Regiments rotated through the position on weekly basis, Rowell and his staff remained to oversee the position. However, Rowell became ill and died in early August, after which Glasgow assumed command of the position. On 7 August 1915, Glasgow led an attack on Dead Man's Ridge; the ridge had sweeping views of The Nek. The assault secured part of the Turkish trenchline, but after the failed attack on the Nek, Glasgow, realising that the ridge would now be subjected to a strong counter-attack, ordered a retreat. Bringing up the rear, Glasgow, carried one of the wounded back as the Australians withdrew. Of the 200 men who had taken part in the attack, 60 had been killed, and another 94 wounded, including every officer except Glasgow. In the aftermath, Glasgow was promoted to lieutenant colonel and given command of the 2nd Light Horse Regiment.

Portrait of Glasgow in uniform, by George Bell

In December 1915, the Allied forces withdrew from Gallipoli. In the aftermath, the Australian government decided to expand the AIF in Egypt prior to its commitment to the Western Front. As part of this process, the 13th Brigade was raised from a cadre of experienced personnel from the 3rd Brigade and reinforcements from Australia. Glasgow was given command of the new brigade in March 1916. He commanded the brigade for the next two years, including their first major action in September 1916, at Mouquet Farm. Later, the brigade fought around Messines in June 1917, Polygon Wood in September and Dernancourt in early April 1918, where the brigade fought a defensive action that helped halt the German Spring Offensive. After the Germans captured Villers-Bretonneux in mid-April 1918, Glasgow's brigade was assigned to launch a counterattack to retake the village, on the right of the attacking force. Glasgow did not agree with the 8:00 pm start time of the attack: he wanted to attack under moonlight at 10:30pm, but this was adjusted to 10:00pm. Ross Mallett recounts that "at the height of the battle, with the 13th Brigade surrounded on three sides, the Germans had sent Glasgow a message demanding that he surrender. 'Tell them to go to Hell' was his response".

At the Second Battle of Villers-Bretonneux in April 1918, Glasgow's 13th Brigade, and Harold Elliott's 15th Brigade, recaptured the town of Villers-Bretonneux on 25 April 1918 after the Germans had overrun the British 8th Division under General William Heneker. This feat was described by Lieutenant-General Sir John Monash as the turning-point of the war, although, according to historian Peter Dennis this characterisation was an exaggeration.

As the German offensive was fought to a halt, Glasgow was appointed to take over command of the 1st Division on 30 June 1918. At the time, the division was assigned to the front in Flanders, where it was fighting beside British formations; but later, the 1st Division was moved to the Somme. During the Allied Hundred Days Offensive, Glasgow's division fought actions at Amiens (8 August 1918), Lihons (9–11 August 1918), Chuignes (23 August 1918) and along the Hindenburg Line (18 September 1918). The Australians were withdrawn from the line in October, and did not see action again before the war came to an end in November 1918.

After the war, Glasgow returned to part-time soldiering, and in 1921 he was placed in command of the 4th Division. He was also heavily involved with commemoration services, and according to Mallett, he led "the Anzac Day parade in Brisbane for twenty years".

== Politics ==
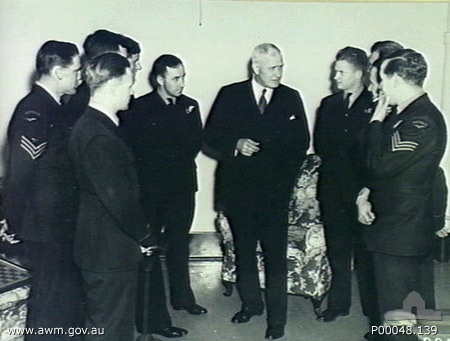
Glasgow, as High Commissioner to Canada, speaks with aircrew of the British Commonwealth Air Training Scheme in the Anzac club.

After his return to Australia, Glasgow was demobilised in August 1919, and was elected to the Senate at the 1919 federal election, standing for the Nationalist Party in Queensland. In June 1926, Prime Minister Stanley Bruce promoted him to cabinet as Minister for Home and Territories. He was promoted to Minister for Defence in April 1927, which office he held until the government's defeat at the 1929 election when James Scullin's Labor government assumed power. He was subsequently elected Deputy Leader of the Opposition in the Senate. According to Mallett, "Glasgow saw his role as frustrating Labor's inflationary policies". Later, during the 1931 election, a swing toward the Labor Party in Queensland – contrary to the result at the national level – resulted in Glasgow losing his seat. He subsequently returned to his career as a pastoralist. He also undertook the directorship of several companies.

== High Commissioner to Canada ==
Glasgow became the first Australian High Commissioner to Canada when he was appointed to the role in December 1939. At the time, Australia had few overseas diplomatic missions, with Canada being only the fifth to receive an Australian diplomatic representative. In the role, Glasgow was involved in negotiating and overseeing aspects of the Empire Air Training Scheme in Canada, and promoted the Australian war effort. According to Mallett, in the role, Glasgow "built good relations with the Canadian Prime Minister Mackenzie King and his ministers, but was not successful in getting Canadian support for Australian strategy in the Pacific". Nevertheless, he successfully worked to establish a "mutual aid" agreement that saw Australia receive two merchant ships from Canada. Glasgow also attended several inter-Allied conferences in Quebec in August 1943 and September 1944, where he "represented Australian interests".

== Final years ==
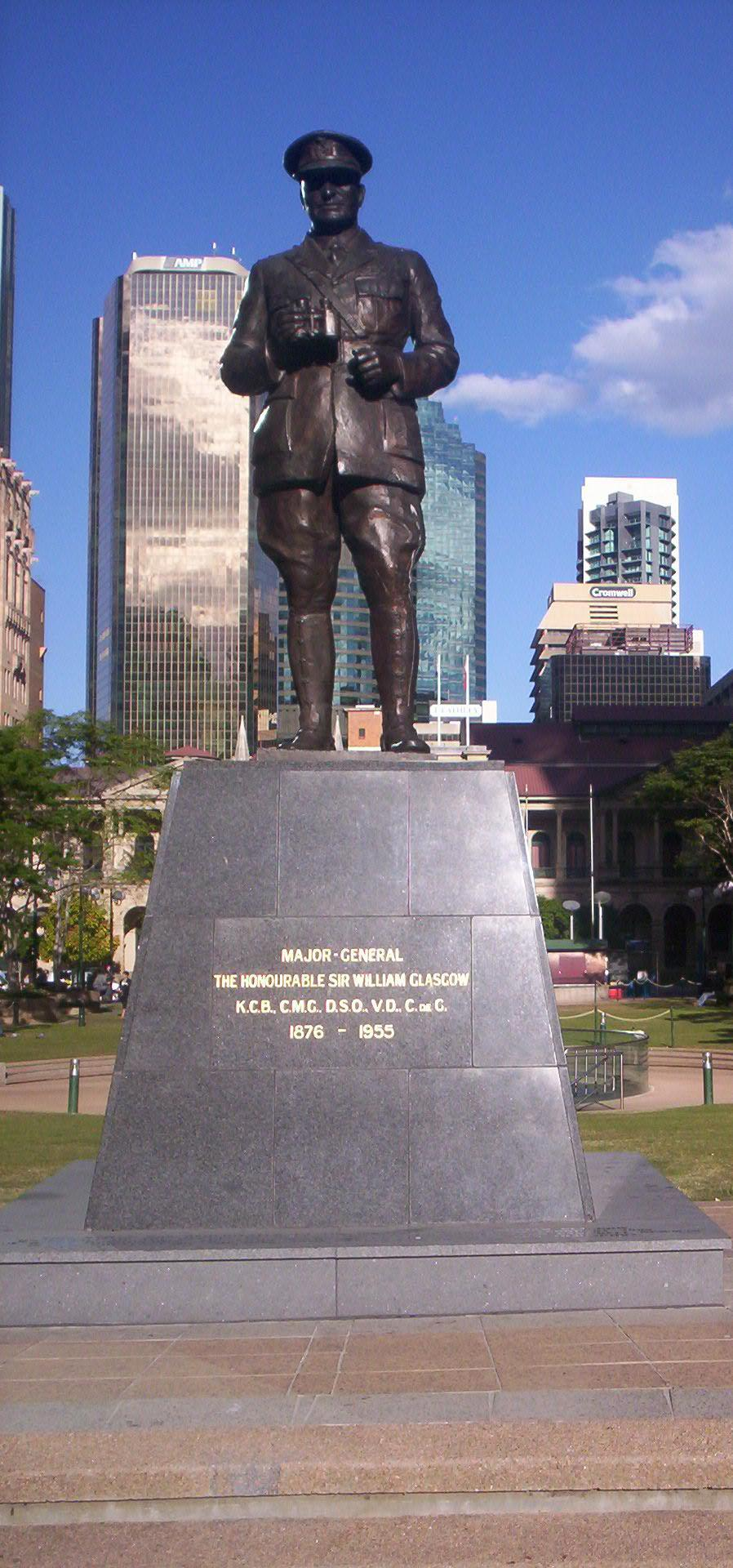
Statue of the Major-General at Post Office Square, Brisbane. (The statue is facing ANZAC Square.)

In 1945, after being succeeded as High Commissioner by Alfred Stirling, Glasgow returned to Australia. The war over, he returned to private life, continuing his work as a businessman and pastoralist. He died on 4 July 1955, in Brisbane. His wife, Annie, and their two daughters survived him. After a state funeral at St Andrew's Presbyterian Church, Glasgow was cremated.

== Honours ==
For his services during the war, Glasgow received several honours. In June 1916, he became a Companion of the Order of St Michael and St George (CMG). This was followed in December 1917 by appointment as a Companion of the Order of the Bath (CB). In the 1919 New Year Honours, he was appointed Knight Commander of the Order of the Bath (KCB). He was Mentioned in Despatches a further nine times (in addition to the one from the Boer War) and was also appointed an Officer of the Légion d'Honneur by the French. He also received the French Croix de Guerre and the Belgian Croix de Guerre.

A statue of Glasgow, cast in bronze, was erected in Brisbane in 1966, near Roma and Turbot Streets. During 2008, the statue was moved to Post Office Square (opposite ANZAC Square), also in Brisbane.

== Notes ==
Political offices
| Preceded by George Pearce | Minister for Home and Territories; 1926–1927 | Succeeded by Charles Marr |
| Preceded by Neville Howse | Minister for Defence; 1927–1929 | Succeeded by Albert Green |
Diplomatic posts
| New title | Australian High Commissioner to Canada; 1939–1945 | Succeeded by Alfred Stirling |
