= Volunteer Long Service Medal for India and the Colonies =

UK volunteer long service medal

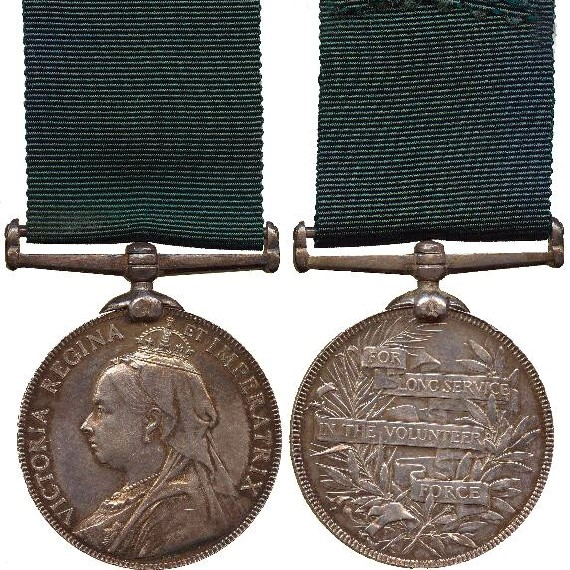
- Queen Victoria version
- Type: Military long service medal
- Awarded for: Twenty years service Eighteen years service in India
- Country: United Kingdom
- Presented by: the Monarch of the United Kingdom of Great Britain and Ireland, and Empress of India
- Eligibility: Other ranks and Officers who have served in the ranks of the Volunteer Forces throughout the British Empire
- Status: Discontinued in 1930
- Established: 1896
- Final award: 1930
- Ribbon bar

Order of Wear
- Next (higher): Volunteer Officers' Decoration for India and the Colonies
- Next (lower): Colonial Auxiliary Forces Officers' Decoration
- Related: Volunteer Long Service Medal

The Volunteer Long Service Medal was instituted in 1894 as an award for long service by other ranks and some officers of the United Kingdom's Volunteer Force. In 1896, the grant of the medal was extended to other ranks and officers who had served in the ranks of the Volunteer Forces throughout the British Empire. A separate new medal was instituted, the Volunteer Long Service Medal for India and the Colonies. Awarding of this medal was discontinued in stages when it was superseded in most territories by the Colonial Auxiliary Forces Long Service Medal in 1899 and in the remainder by the Efficiency Medal in 1930.

== Origin ==
The Volunteer Long Service Medal was instituted in 1894 as an award for long service by other ranks in the part-time Volunteer Force of the United Kingdom, as well as to officers who had served in the ranks but who had not qualified for the award of the Volunteer Officers' Decoration. The qualifying period of service was twenty years.

== Institution ==
On 13 June 1896, the grant of the Volunteer Long Service Medal was extended by Queen Victoria to members of Volunteer Forces throughout the British Empire, defined as being India, the Dominion of Canada, the Crown Colonies and the British Protectorates. A separate new medal was instituted, the Volunteer Long Service Medal for India and the Colonies. Institution of this medal was not, as usual, by Royal Warrant, but in terms of a special Army Order. This medal was similar in design to the Volunteer Long Service Medal, but bore different inscriptions on the obverse of each monarch's version.

== Award criteria ==
The qualifying period of service was also twenty years, except in India, where it was eighteen years. The medal could be awarded upon the recommendation by an individual's present or, if retired, former commanding officer. Service had to have been consecutive, with allowance being made for special circumstances. Officer recipients had to surrender the medal if they were subsequently awarded either the Volunteer Officers' Decoration or the Volunteer Officers' Decoration for India and the Colonies.

== Order of wear ==
In the order of wear prescribed by the British Central Chancery of the Orders of Knighthood, the Volunteer Long Service Medal for India and the Colonies takes precedence after the Volunteer Officers' Decoration for India and the Colonies and before the Colonial Auxiliary Forces Officers' Decoration.

- Preceded by the Volunteer Officers' Decoration for India and the Colonies (VD).
- Succeeded by the Colonial Auxiliary Forces Officers' Decoration (VD).

== Description ==
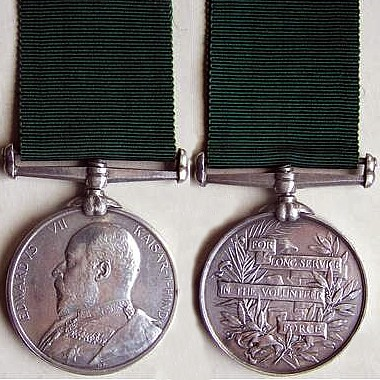
King Edward VII double-toe claw version

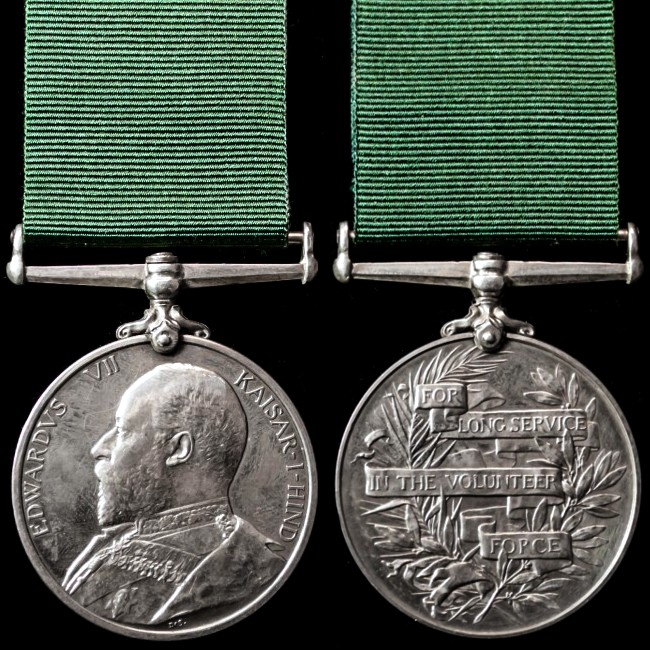
King Edward VII single-toe claw version

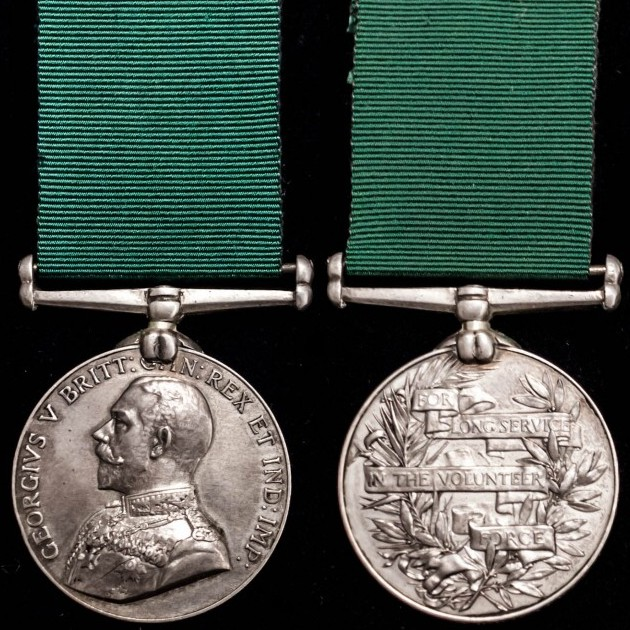
King George V version

The medal was struck in silver and is a disk, 1.45 inches (37 millimetres) in diameter, with a raised rim on each side. It is suspended from a straight swivelling silver bar, affixed to the medal by means of a claw and a pin through the upper edge of the medal.

Obverse

The obverse of the medal depicts the reigning monarch. Three obverse versions of the medal were struck.

- The original version of 1896, created by George William de Saulles, shows the effigy of Queen Victoria wearing the Crown, a veil and the Star of the Order of the Garter. The effigy is circumscribed "VICTORIA REGINA ET IMPERATRIX" (Victoria, Queen and Empress). This version's suspender is affixed to the medal by means of a double-toe claw. Some Queen Victoria medals were awarded up to July 1902, post-dating her death.
- The King Edward VII version, introduced after his succession to the throne in 1901, displays his effigy in Field Marshal's uniform. The effigy, also created by De Saulles, is circumscribed "EDWARDVS VII KAISAR-I-HIND" (Edward VII, Emperor of India) in the Hindustani language. On this version the suspender is affixed to the medal by means of either the older double-toe or the later single-toe claw. Some King Edward VII medals were awarded up to April 1911, post-dating his death.
- The King George V version, introduced after his succession to the throne in 1910, shows the King in Field Marshal's uniform and is circumscribed "GEORGIVS V BRITT: OMN: REX ET IND: IMP:" (George V, King of Great Britain, Emperor of India). This version's suspender is affixed to the medal by means of the older double-toe claw.

Reverse

The reverse shows a palm and laurel wreath which supports a scrolled banner, bearing the inscription "FOR LONG SERVICE IN THE VOLUNTEER FORCE" in four lines.

Ribbon

The ribbon is the same as that of the Volunteer Long Service Medal, plain dark green and 1 1/4 inches (32 millimetres) wide.

== Discontinuation ==
Between 1899 and 1902, the medal was superseded by the Colonial Auxiliary Forces Long Service Medal in the Dominion, the Crown Colonies, the British Protectorates and most Crown Dependencies.

It continued to be awarded to the Isle of Man Volunteers until the 7th (Isle of Man) Volunteer Battalion was disbanded on 3 March 1920, and in Bermuda and India until 1930, when it was finally superseded by the Efficiency Medal.
