= General Post Office, Brisbane =

Heritage-listed post office in Brisbane, Queensland

Coordinates: 27.468174°S 153.028173°E

General Post Office Brisbane
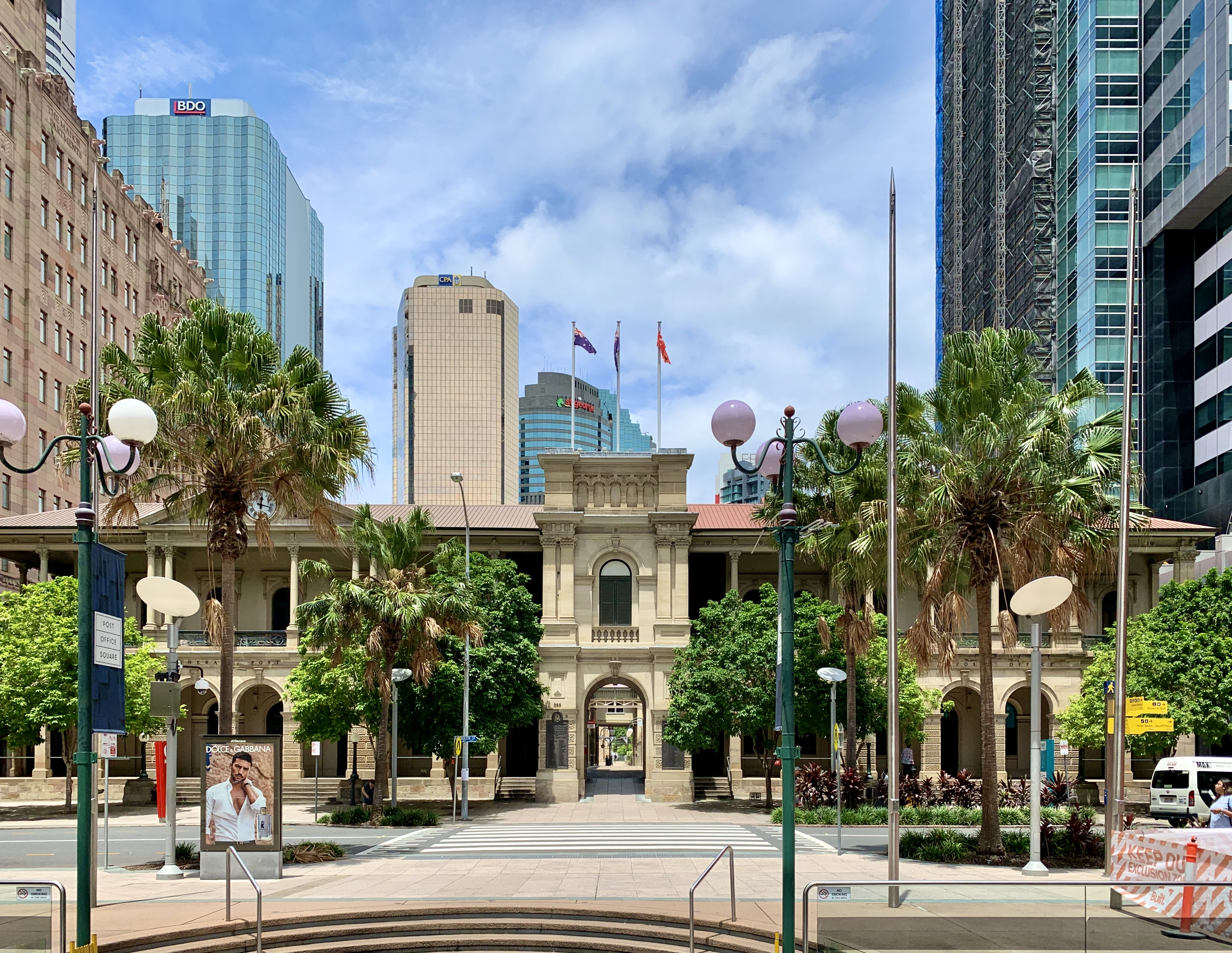
- General Post Office, Brisbane, 2020
- Interactive map of the General Post Office; Brisbane area
- Alternative names: GPO

General information
- Type: Post Office
- Architectural style: Neoclassical architecture
- Location: Brisbane central business district, 261 Queen Street, Brisbane
- Current tenants: Australia Post
- Construction started: 1871
- Inaugurated: 28 September 1872
- Owner: Australia Post

Height
- Height: 50 feet (15 m)

Technical details
- Structural system: Brick and stone
- Floor count: 2

Design and construction
- Architect: F. G. D. Stanley
- Main contractor: John Petrie

References
- General Post Office History

The General Post Office (GPO) in Brisbane, Queensland, Australia, is a heritage-listed postal and telegraph office located at 261 Queen Street. Originally constructed in 1872, it was extended through to Elizabeth Street in 1908. The GPO remains in use by Australia Post to the present day. Opposite the GPO is Post Office Square.

== History ==
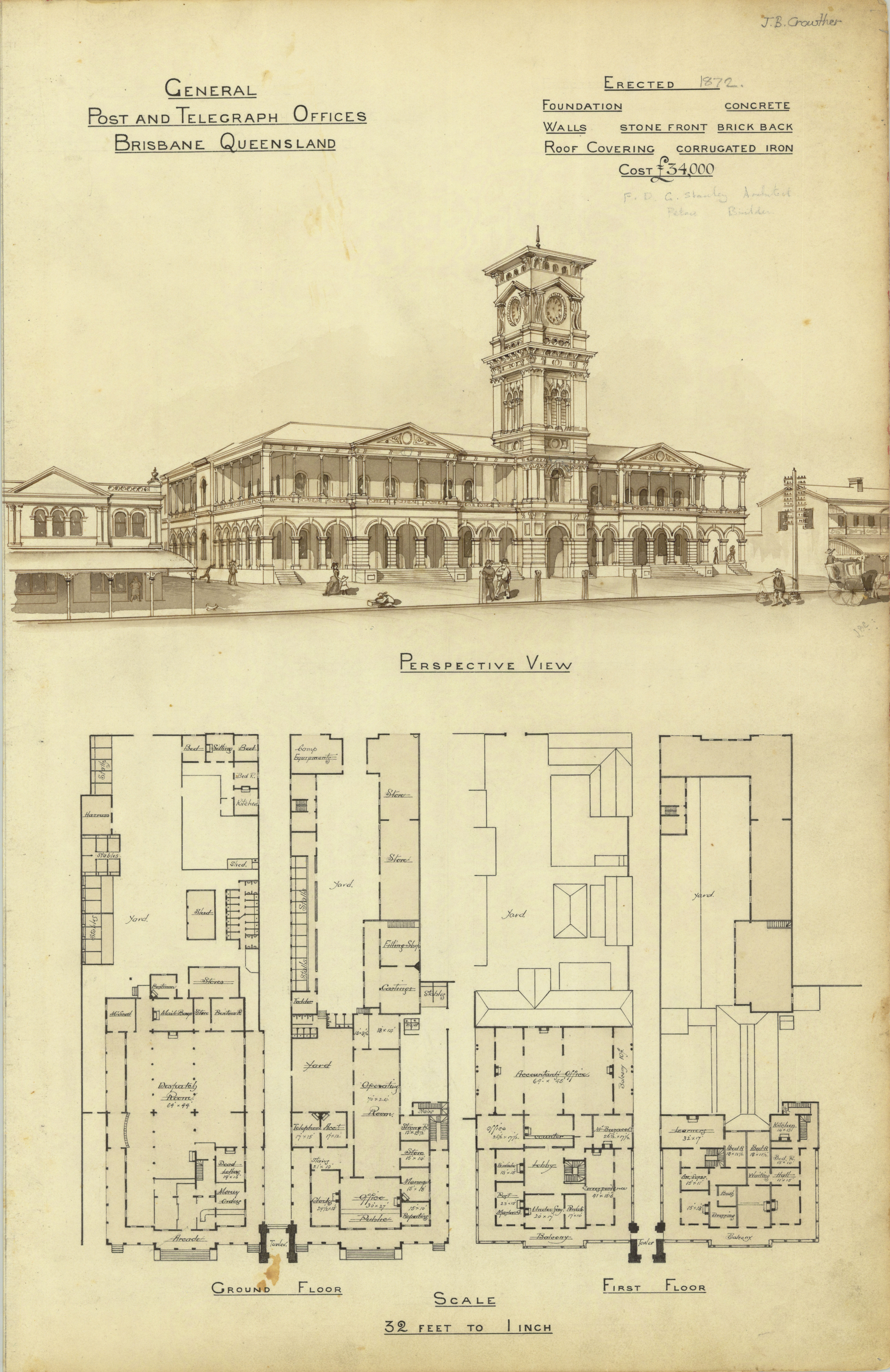
Architectural plans for the Brisbane GPO, 1872

The first full-time postmaster in Brisbane was J. E. Barney, appointed in 1852. In 1862, Thomas Lodge Murray Prior became the first Postmaster-General for the state of Queensland. Initially, postal services operated from a small convict-era building, which was inconveniently distant from the telegraph office. The Postmaster-General selected a centrally located half-hectare site for the new post office.

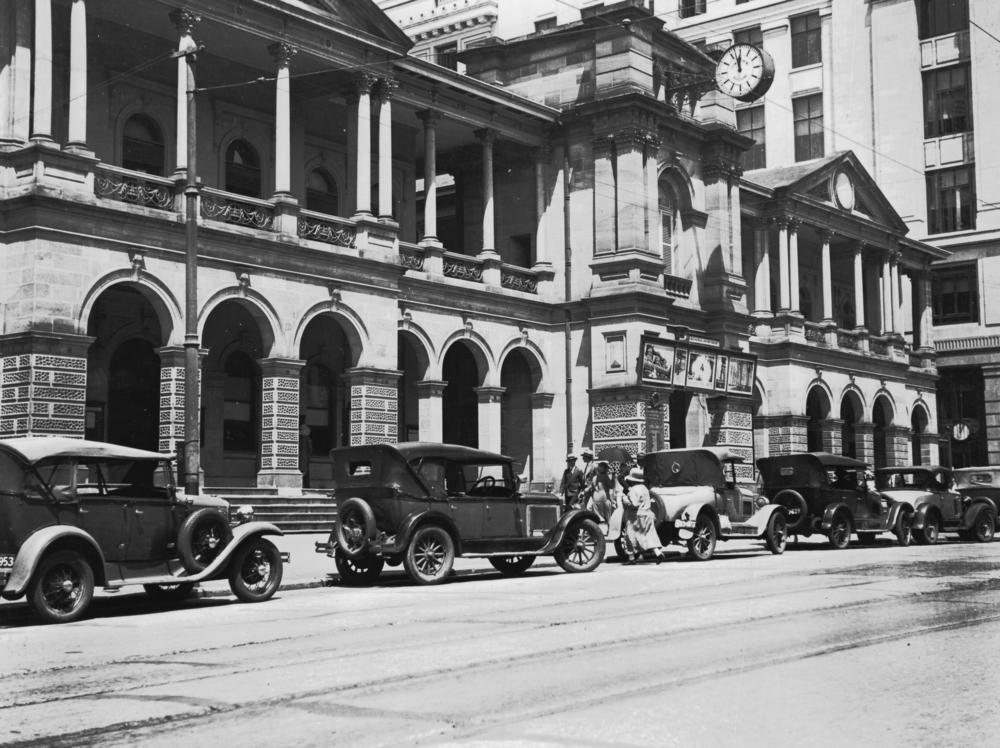
The GPO in 1931

The building previously located at the Queen Street site, which once housed women convicts, was demolished in 1871.

Freestone and bricks were sourced locally for the construction. The GPO officially opened on 28 September 1872. In 1873, the Queensland Museum was housed in the General Post Office building until it moved to the William Street building in 1879. That same year, a second wing constructed by John Petrie was completed, allowing the telegraph office to relocate to the GPO, much to the satisfaction of business customers

The building features deep verandahs and high ceilings. A clock mounted in the pediment above the main entrance was once illuminated by a gas-powered light, later replaced by a smaller electric clock. In 1892, the first typewriter used in any Australian post office was introduced at the GPO. Stamps and money orders were once available to customers through windows outside the building, which are now closed.

The building has been listed on the Brisbane City Council Heritage Register.

== Gallery ==
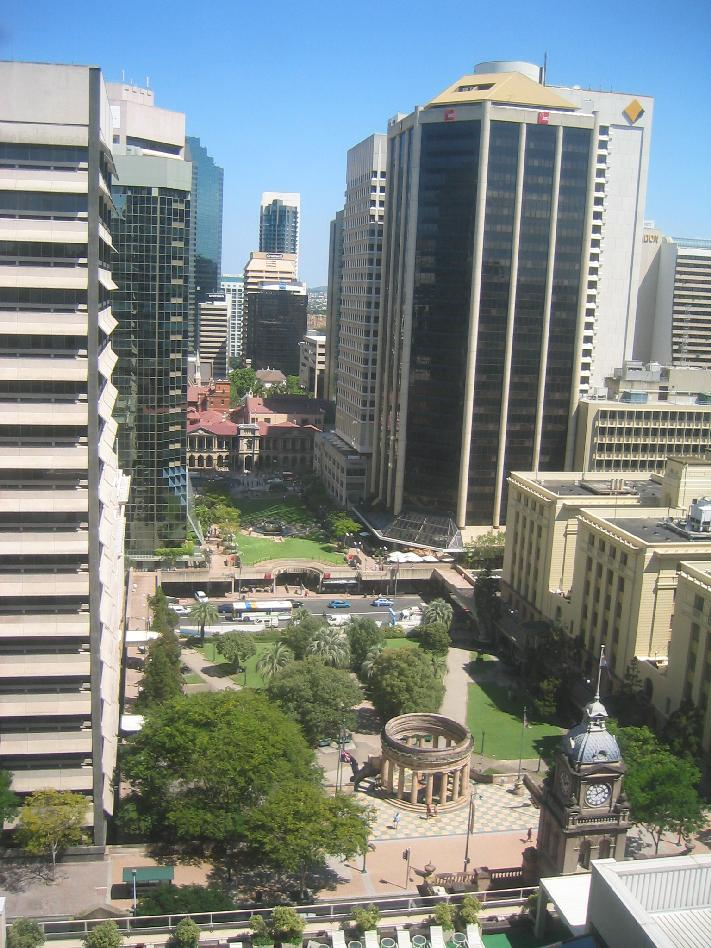
View of the ANZAC Square, Post Office Square, and the General Post Office, as seen from the Sofitel Hotel.

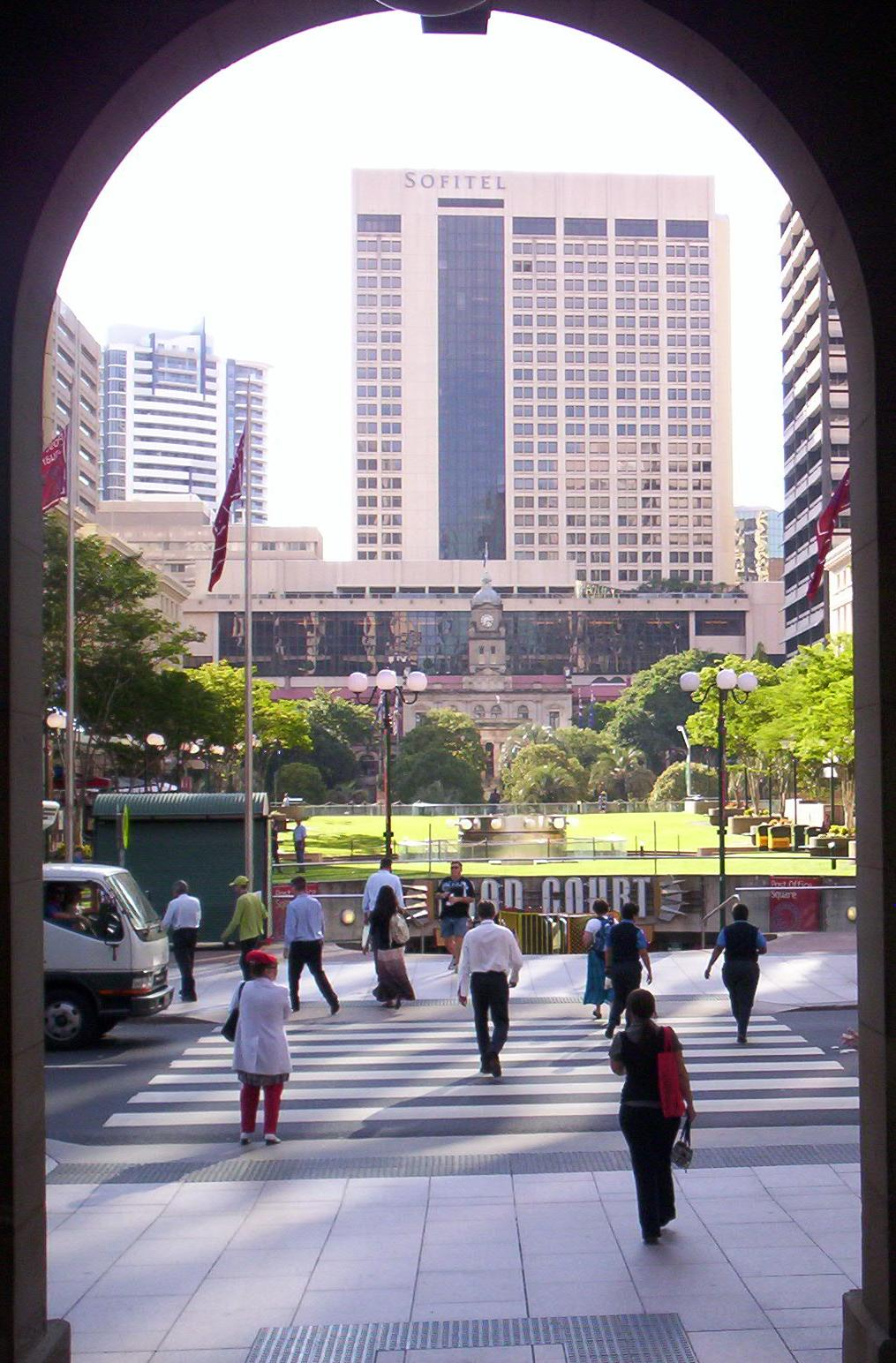
View from Brisbane GPO – showing the Post Office Square, Sofitel Hotel, and Central Station

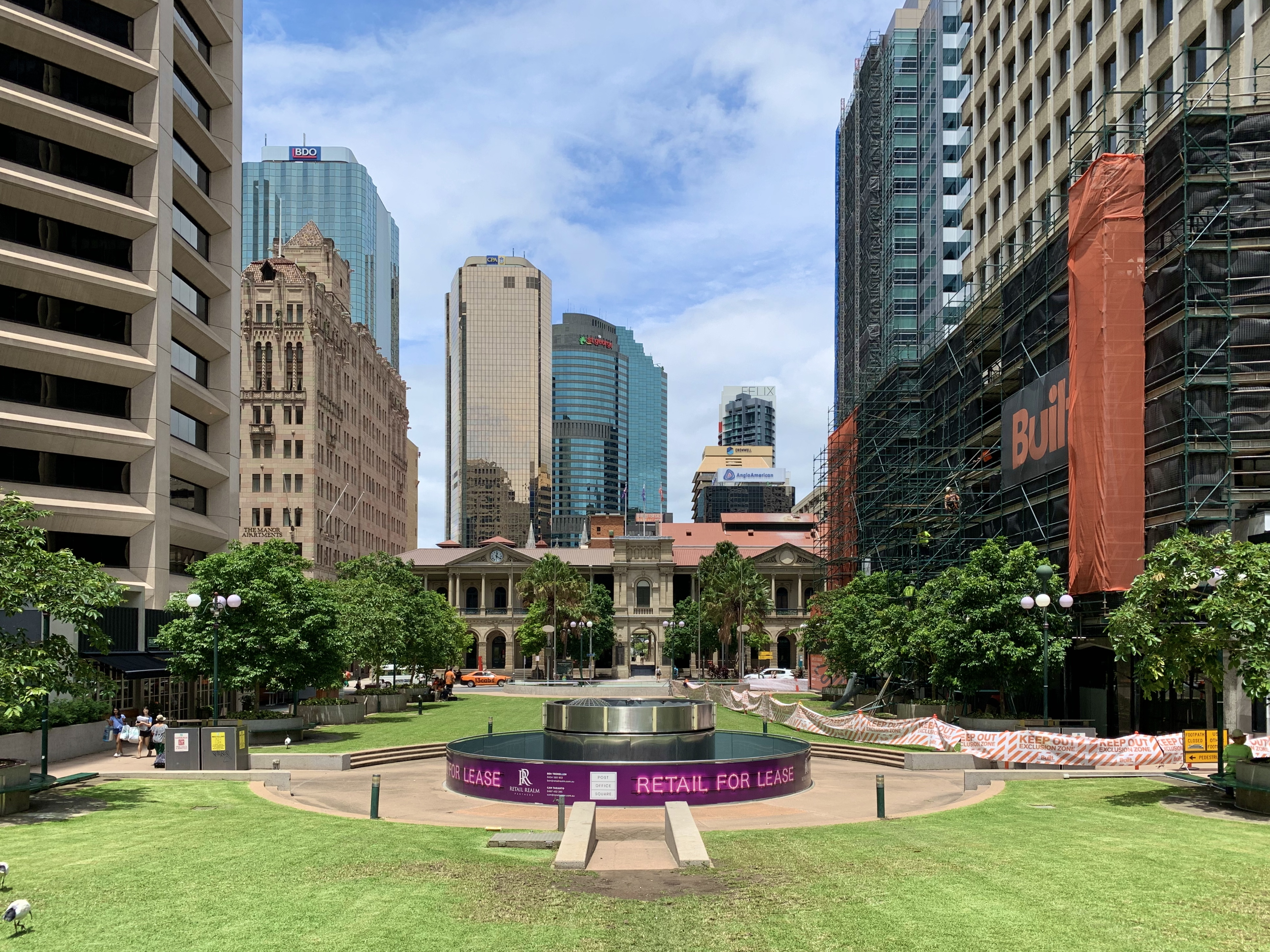
General Post Office, Brisbane, as seen from the Post Office Square.

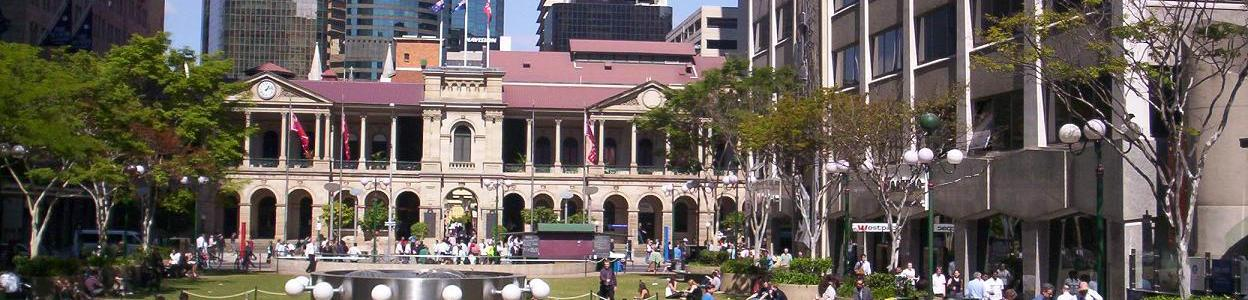
General Post Office, as seen from the Post Office Square.

== See also ==
- Other General Post Offices
