= Sir William Glasgow Memorial =

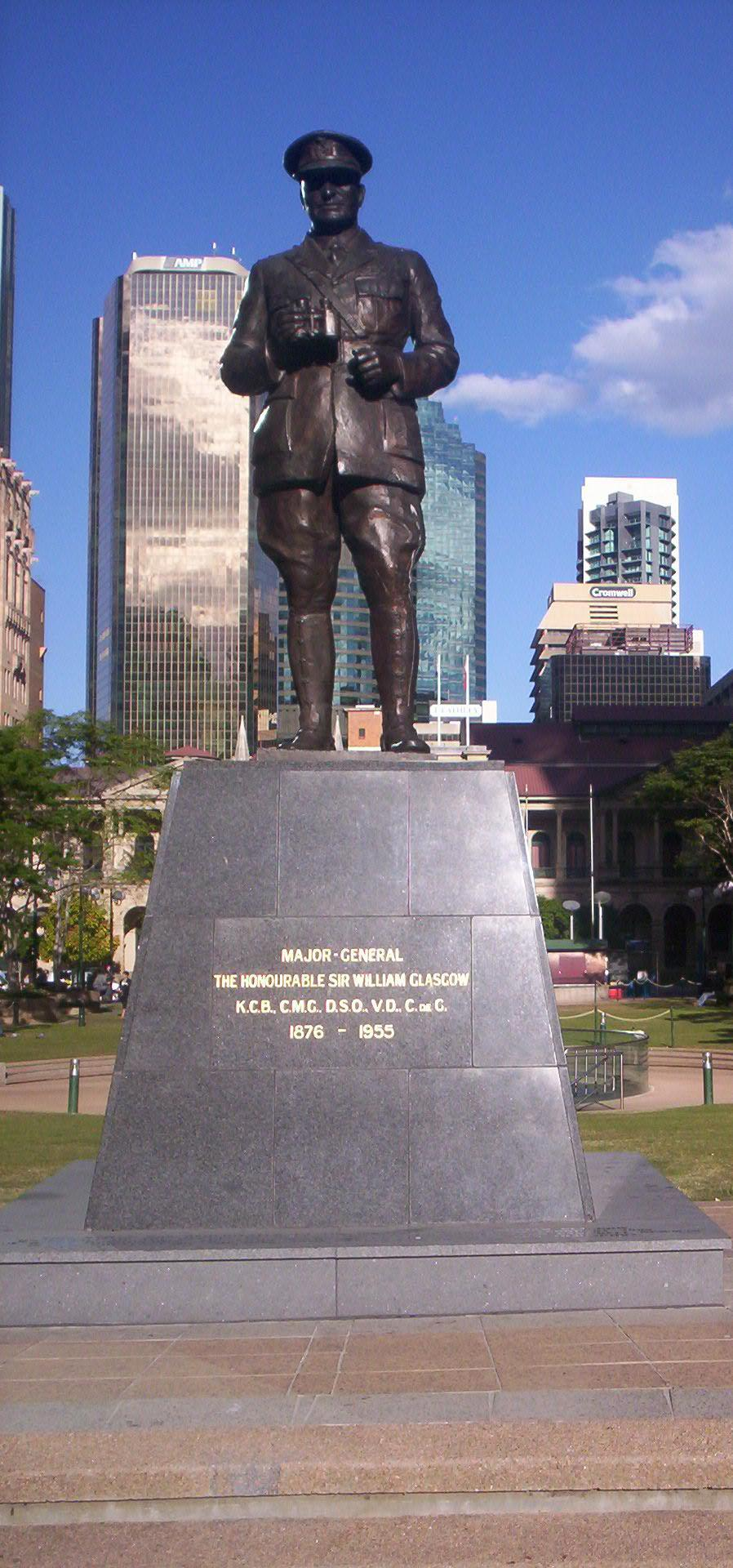
- Sir William Glasgow Memorial in Post Office Square, 2009

- Location within Queensland
- 27.4677°S 153.0229°E
- Location: 270 Queen Street, Brisbane City, City of Brisbane, Queensland, Australia

History
- Design period: 1940s–1960s (post-World War II)
- Built: c. 1961–1964

Site notes
- Architect: Daphne Mayo

Queensland Heritage Register
- Official name: Sir William Glasgow Memorial
- Type: state heritage (built)
- Designated: 13 May 2004
- Reference no.: 602439
- Significant period: 1960s (fabric)
- Significant components: trees/plantings, memorial – statue

The Sir William Glasgow Memorial is a heritage-listed statue of Sir William Glasgow in Post Office Square at 270 Queen Street, Brisbane CBD, City of Brisbane, Queensland, Australia. It was designed by Daphne Mayo and built from 1961 to 1964. It was added to the Queensland Heritage Register on 13 May 2004.

Set on a granite plinth, the statue is a naturalistic bronze figure of Sir William Glasgow, wearing the uniform of an officer of the Australian Light Horse and holding a pair of field glasses. The statue was one of the last commissioned works of sculptor Daphne Mayo. It was commissioned in 1961 and completed in 1964. It was dedicated in a ceremony on Remembrance Day (11 November) 1966 by Sir Arthur Fadden (Australian Prime Minister in 1941).

Originally, the statue stood on the Police Reserve at the corner of Ann Street and Roma Street, Brisbane on a sandstone plinth. In 1968, it was moved to a triangular reserve bounded by Albert Street, Roma Street and Turbot Street. In 2008, the statue was relocated to Post Office Square, facing ANZAC Square.

== History ==
The Sir William Glasgow Memorial was designed by Queensland sculptor Daphne Mayo and completed in 1964. It is in the form of a naturalistic bronze figure of Sir William, dressed in Australian Light Horse uniform and set on a granite plinth.

Thomas William Glasgow was born at Blackmount, near Tiaro, Queensland in 1876. He was educated at One Mile State School in Gympie and at Maryborough Grammar School. After leaving school he initially worked as a clerk in the office of a mining company, then as a bank clerk in Gympie. He joined the Wide Bay Regiment, Queensland Mounted Infantry, while still in his teens. In 1897 he was one of 20 chosen to represent Queensland at Queen Victoria's Diamond Jubilee celebrations in London. He served in the Boer War as a lieutenant in the 1st Queensland Mounted Infantry Contingent, when he took part in the relief of Kimberley and the occupation of Bloemfontein. He was mentioned in despatches and awarded the Distinguished Service Order in 1901, an unusual distinction for someone of his rank.

After the war Glasgow returned to his hometown and took over the operation of his father's grocery store together with his brother, though he married in 1904 and purchased a cattle station in Central Queensland. In 1903, he had organised the 13th Light Horse Regiment at Gympie and was promoted to captain in 1906 and major in 1912. When war broke out in 1914 he was appointed to the Australian Imperial Force with the rank of major in the 2nd Light Horse Regiment, which embarked for Egypt in August 1914. Glasgow distinguished himself at Gallipoli and was promoted to lieutenant colonel. In 1916 he became brigadier-general in command of the 13th Australian Infantry Brigade on the Western Front.

His most memorable battle was at Villers-Bretonneux on 25 April 1918. Two Australian brigades, including Glasgow's, had been given the task of recapturing this village, recently taken by the Germans and a key position. Glasgow's plan of attack differed from that put forward by the high command, but his opinion prevailed and the action was a great success, later described as a turning point in the war. After this battle Glasgow was promoted to major general and given command of the Australian 1st Division.

In 1919 William Glasgow returned to Australia and was knighted. He continued in the pastoral industry but entered Australian Parliament as a Senator in 1920 and served as Minister for Home Affairs and Minister for Defence. Between 1940 and 1945 he served as Australia's first High Commissioner to Canada.

Sir William died in Brisbane in 1955 and was given a State funeral. The Queensland Club set up a memorial fund and commissioned at statue by the important Australian sculptor, Daphne Mayo, in 1961.

Mayo studied in Brisbane under L J Harvey and was awarded the Wattle Day League travelling art fellowship in 1914. Although the outbreak of World War I delayed her taking up the fellowship, she travelled to London in 1918 at the war's end, and studied at the Royal Academy. There she won the Landseer Scholarship and the Edward Stott travelling scholarship to Rome. She returned to Brisbane in 1925 and began to exhibit her work in Brisbane and Sydney.

Daphne Mayo was most productive in the 1920s and 30s and she is probably best known for her allegorical work, The Progress of Civilization in the State of Queensland, on the tympanum of the Brisbane City Hall (1930) and the Women's War Memorial in Anzac Square, Brisbane (1929–30). She was awarded an MBE for her services to art in 1959 and became a Trustee of the Queensland Art Gallery. In 1964 her statue of Sir William Glasgow was completed and the work was dedicated on Anzac Day, 1966. It was Mayo's last major commission and she died in 1982.

The statue was originally sited on the Police Reserve at the corner of Ann and Roma Streets, but was moved to its present site on a triangular reserve near the Roma Street tunnel in 1968. A modern plinth sheeted with granite has replaced the original sandstone plinth. In 2008, the statue was relocated to Post Office Square, facing ANZAC Square.

== Description ==
The Sir William Glasgow Memorial Statue is a bronze statue and is about 2.5 metres (8 ft 2 in) high and is set on a tapered plinth, which is clad with panels of grey granite and bears inscriptions detailing Glasgow's career and service record.

The statue depicts Glasgow in the uniform of an officer of the Light Horse holding a pair of field glasses. He is standing at ease in a relaxed and natural pose and gazes reflectively into the distance. The stamp of the foundry, Foundaria Natistica, Battaglia, Milan is imprinted on the bronze behind the statue's right heel.

The monument is shaded by two mature fig trees on the Albert Street edge of the reserve.

== Heritage listing ==
Sir William Glasgow Memorial was listed on the Queensland Heritage Register on 13 May 2004 having satisfied the following criteria.

The place is important in demonstrating the evolution or pattern of Queensland's history.

The statue commemorates the role played by prominent Queenslander, Sir William Glasgow, in the major events of World War I and his service to the community.

The place is important in demonstrating the principal characteristics of a particular class of cultural places.

As a monument, prominently sited and erected by subscription as an enduring record of a person's public service and contribution to major historical events, the statue of Sir William demonstrates the principal characteristics of public memorials, being both a commemoration and exemplar of attributes admired by the community.

The place is important because of its aesthetic significance.

The statue of Sir William Glasgow is important for the quality of its design and execution and the major contribution it makes to the streetscape. The mature fig trees on the reserve also add to the aesthetic value and visual impact of the site.

The place has a special association with the life or work of a particular person, group or organisation of importance in Queensland's history.

It is significant for its connection with the life and work of the important Australian sculptor, Daphne Mayo, as her last major commissioned work.
