= Colonial Auxiliary Forces Officers' Decoration =

British military award, 1899–1930

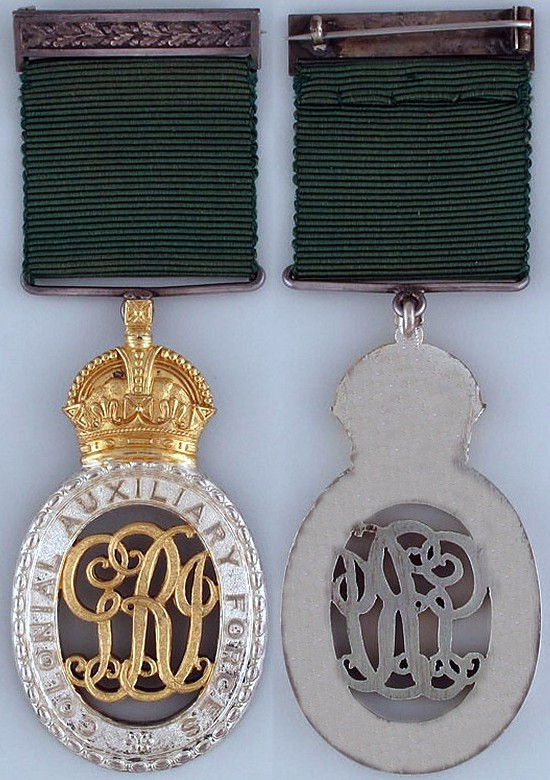
- First King George V version, 32 mm ribbon
- Type: Military long service decoration
- Awarded for: Twenty years meritorious service
- Country: United Kingdom
- Presented by: the Monarch of the United Kingdom of Great Britain and Ireland, and Empress of India
- Eligibility: Officers of part-time Colonial Forces
- Post-nominals: VD
- Status: Discontinued in 1930
- Established: 1899
- 32 mm and 38 mm ribbon bars

Order of wear
- Next (higher): Volunteer Long Service Medal for India and the Colonies
- Equivalent: Indian Volunteer Forces Officers' Decoration
- Next (lower): Colonial Auxiliary Forces Long Service Medal
- Related: Volunteer Officers' Decoration

The Colonial Auxiliary Forces Officers' Decoration, post-nominal letters VD, was established in 1899 as recognition for long and meritorious service as a part-time commissioned officer in any of the organized military forces of the British Colonies, Dependencies and Protectorates. It superseded the Volunteer Officers' Decoration for India and the Colonies in all these territories, but not in the Indian Empire.

In 1930, the decoration, along with the Volunteer Officers' Decoration and the Territorial Decoration, were superseded by the Efficiency Decoration in an effort to standardise recognition across the British Empire.

== Origin ==
In 1892, the Volunteer Officers' Decoration was instituted as an award for long and meritorious service by officers of the United Kingdom's Volunteer Force. In 1894, the grant of the decoration was extended by Royal Warrant to commissioned officers of volunteer forces throughout the British Empire, defined as being India, the Dominion of Canada, the Crown Colonies and the Crown Dependencies. A separate new decoration was instituted, the Volunteer Officers' Decoration for India and the Colonies.

== Institution ==
The Colonial Auxiliary Forces Officers' Decoration was established by Queen Victoria's Royal Warrant on 18 May 1899. This decoration could be awarded to part-time commissioned officers in recognition of long and meritorious service in any of the organized military forces of the Dominion of Canada and the British Colonies, Dependencies and Protectorates, whether designated as militia or volunteers or otherwise. The decoration superseded the Volunteer Officers' Decoration for India and the Colonies in all these territories, but not in the Indian Empire, where the Indian Volunteer Forces Officers' Decoration would subsequently be instituted.

The use of the post-nominal letters VD by recipients of this decoration was approved by Royal Warrant on 9 May 1925.

== Award criteria ==
The Colonial Auxiliary Forces Officers' Decoration could be awarded for twenty years of service as a part-time commissioned officer in any of the Colonial Auxiliary Forces. Qualifying service could be had by serving in the forces of more than one Colony or Protectorate. Service in the Militia and Volunteer Forces of the United Kingdom was also reckonable, so long as at least half of all qualifying service was rendered in the forces of the Colonies or Protectorates. Service on the West Coast of Africa counted as double time, while half the time served in the ranks prior to being commissioned was also reckonable. Service on the permanent staff was not reckonable.

== Order of wear ==
In the order of wear prescribed by the British Central Chancery of the Orders of Knighthood, the Colonial Auxiliary Forces Officers' Decoration takes precedence after the Volunteer Long Service Medal for India and the Colonies and before the Colonial Auxiliary Forces Long Service Medal. The same ribbon was used for all three awards, except during the period from 1921 to 1927, when the decoration was suspended from a wider green ribbon.

- Preceded by the Volunteer Long Service Medal for India and the Colonies.
- Succeeded by the Colonial Auxiliary Forces Long Service Medal.

== Description ==
The decoration is an oval skeletal design and was struck in silver, with parts of the obverse in silver-gilt. The oval is 1 7/16 inches (37 millimetres) high and 1 1/4 inches (32 millimetres) wide and is suspended by a thin silver wire suspension bar which is attached to a small ring at the top on the reverse.

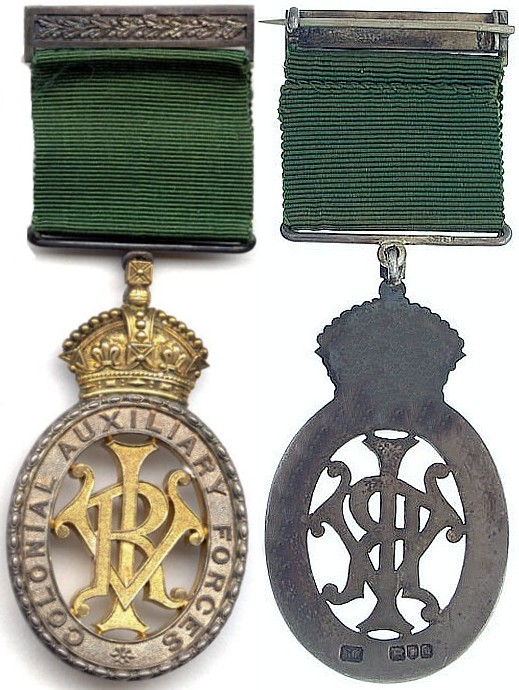
Queen Victoria version, narrow 32 mm ribbon

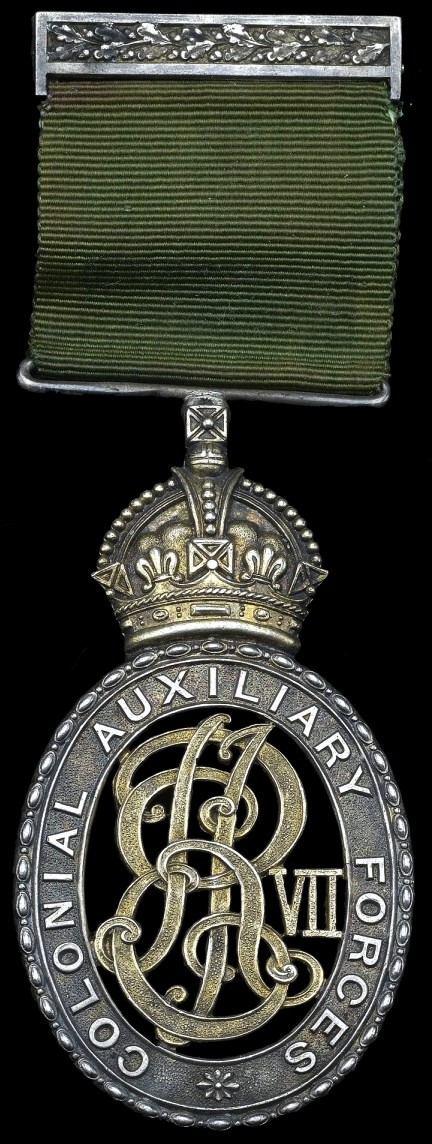
King Edward VII version, narrow 32 mm ribbon

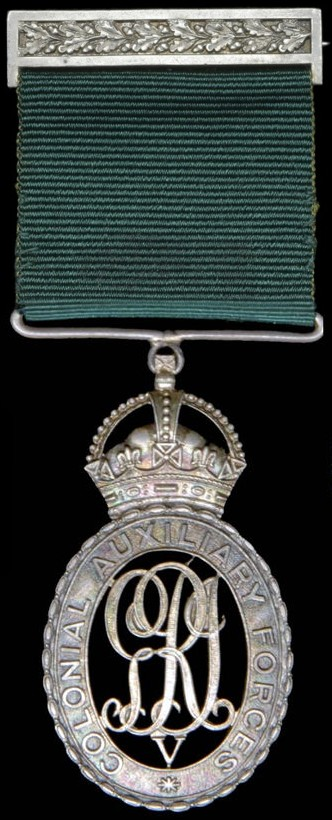
Second King George V version, wider 38 mm ribbon

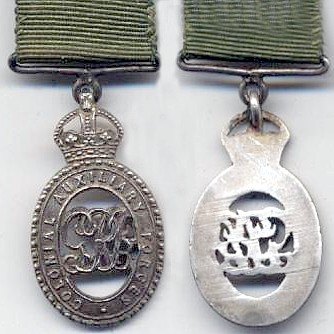
Third King George V version miniature, wider ribbon

Obverse

The obverse is an oval silver band, inscribed "COLONIAL AUXILIARY FORCES" and with the Royal Cypher of the reigning monarch in skeletal form and in silver-gilt in the centre. The oval is surmounted by a silver-gilt Imperial Crown. Five versions of the decoration are known.

- The centre of the decoration's original version of 1899 has the Royal Cypher "VRI" of Queen Victoria, for "Victoria Regina Imperatrix".
- The King Edward VII version, with his Royal Cypher "ERI VII" for "Edwardvs Rex Imperator VII", was introduced after his succession to the throne in 1901.
- The first King George V version, with his Royal Cypher "GRI" for "Georgivs Rex Imperator" as illustrated at the top of the page, was introduced after his succession to the throne in 1910.
- A second King George V version exists, with his Royal Cypher "GRI V" for "Georgivs Rex Imperator V", with the Roman numeral "V" below the cypher "GRI". On this and the third King George V version the crown has two cut-out sections at the top.
- The third King George V version, of which a miniature is illustrated, has the Roman numeral "V" to the right of the cypher "GRI".

Reverse

The reverse is plain. The recipient's name was usually engraved at either the top on the back of the crown or around the circumference of the decoration.

Ribbon

The ribbon, as described in the regulations accompanying the original Royal Warrant of Queen Victoria, is the same as that of the Volunteer Long Service Medal, dark green and 1 1/4 inches (32 millimetres) wide, and suspended from a silver bar-brooch decorated with an oak leaf pattern. In an amendment to the rules and ordinances pertaining to the decoration, published in the Royal Warrant of King George V on 9 June 1921, the ribbon was described as green and 1 1/2 inches (38 millimetres) wide. This wider ribbon and brooch was revoked by the Royal Warrant of King George V on 22 June 1927.

== Discontinuation ==
The Colonial Auxiliary Forces Officers' Decoration, along with the Volunteer Officers' Decoration and the Territorial Decoration, were superseded by the Efficiency Decoration on 23 September 1930, as one decoration to reward long and meritorious service of part-time officers of the Territorial Army in Great Britain and of the Auxiliary Military Forces of the Empire and the Protectorates, to recognize the Imperial character of such service.
