= Post Office Square, Brisbane =

Square in Brisbane, Queensland, Australia

Coordinates: 27°28′4.44″S 153°01′40.44″E

Post Office Square
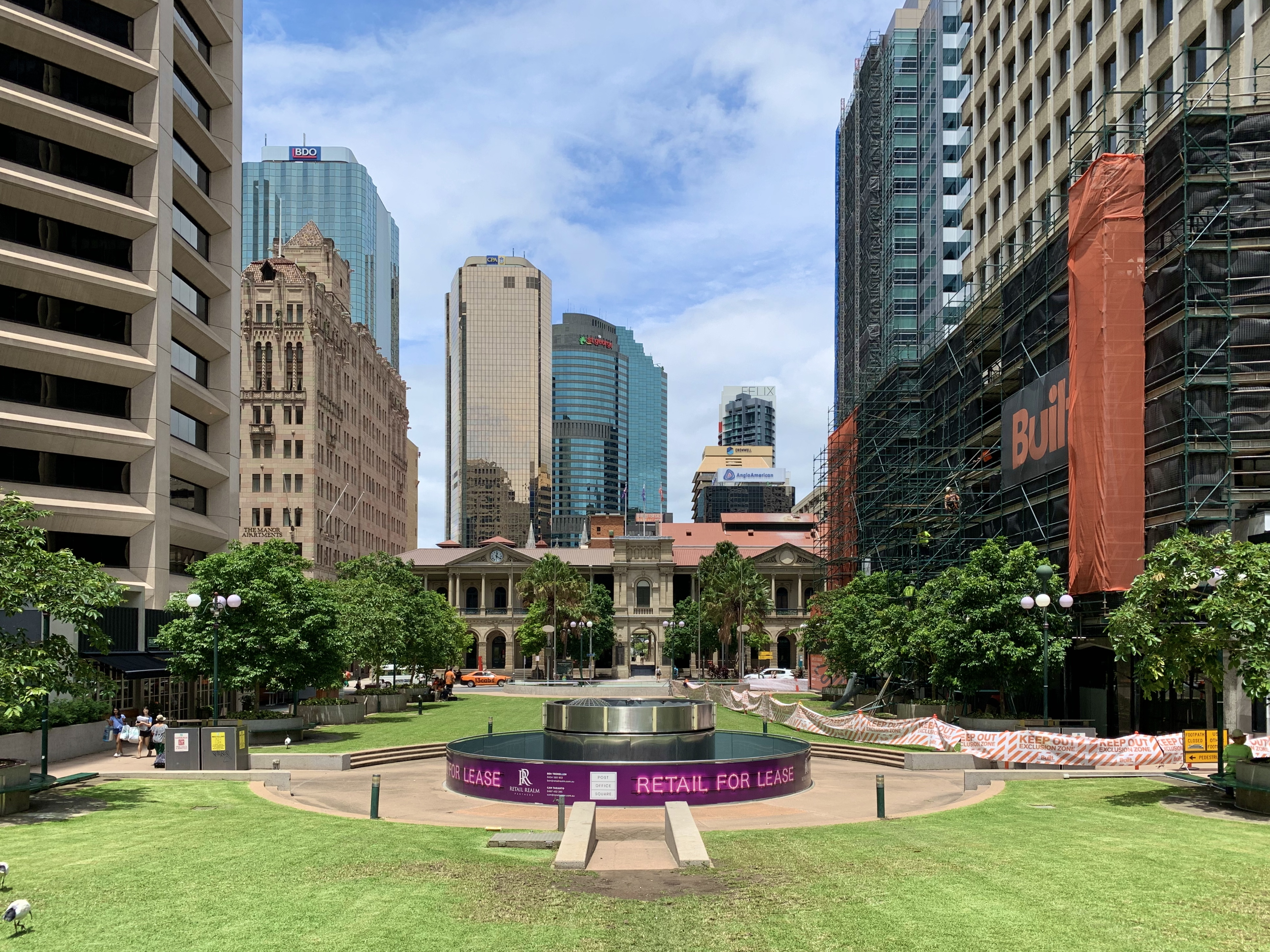
- Post Office Square, looking towards the General Post Office (2020)
- Interactive map of Post Office Square
- Location: Brisbane, Queensland, Australia
- Area: 3,300 m^{2}
- Created: 1984; 42 years ago
- Operator: Brisbane City Council

Post Office Square is a public square in Brisbane, Australia. It is located between Queen Street and Adelaide Street in the Brisbane CBD, and has an area of 3,300 m^{2}.

Under the square is a shopping arcade and six-level car park. The square is opposite the General Post Office building on the Queen Street side, and ANZAC Square on the Adelaide Street side.

== History ==
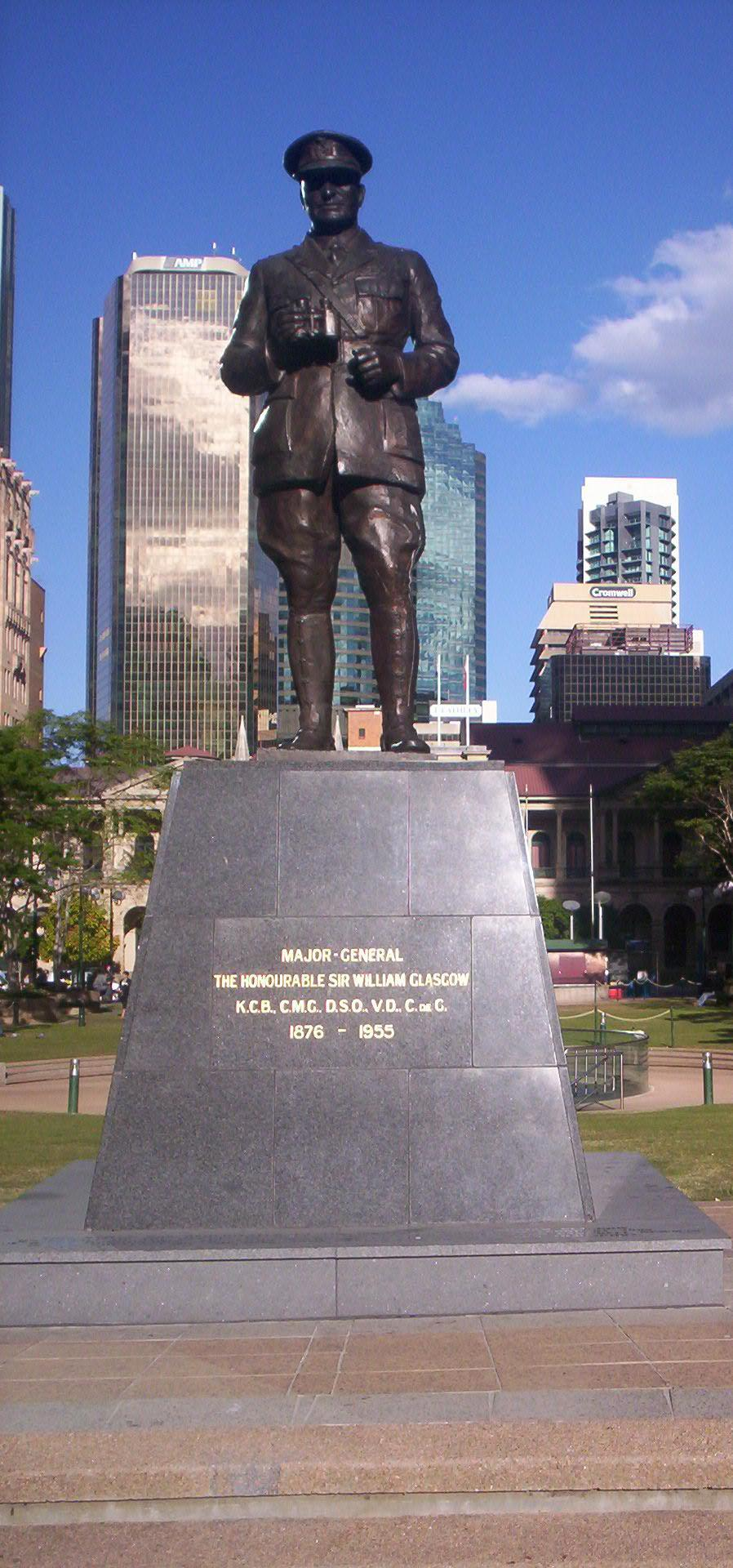
Sir William Glasgow Memorial in Post Office Square, 2009

Post Office Square was opened in 1984. In 2008 the Sir William Glasgow Memorial was moved to the square, facing ANZAC Square.

Protesters camped in Post Office Square from 15 October 2011 as part of Occupy Brisbane, before being evicted on 1 November.
