= Reserve Long Service and Good Conduct Medal =

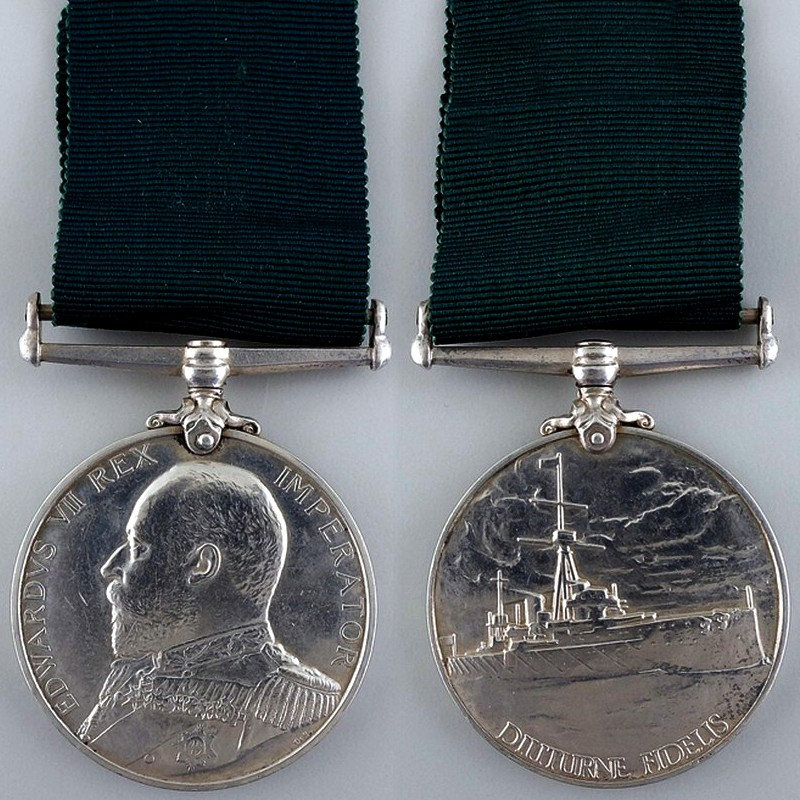
- King Edward VII version with original all-green ribbon
- Type: Military long service medal
- Awarded for: 15 or 12 years service
- Country: United Kingdom
- Presented by: the Monarch of the United Kingdom and the British Dominions, and Emperor of India
- Eligibility: Petty Officers and ratings of the Royal Naval Reserve, Royal Naval Volunteer Reserve, Royal Naval Auxiliary Sick Berth Reserve, Royal Fleet Reserve, Royal Naval Wireless Auxiliary Reserve.
- Post-nominals: None
- Clasps: for 15 or 12 years service
- Status: Superseded by the Volunteer Reserves Service Medal
- Established: 1908
- Final award: 2003
- Related: Royal Naval Volunteer Reserve Long Service and Good Conduct Medal

The Reserve Long Service and Good Conduct Medal was the Long Service Medal of the reserve forces of the Royal Navy. The medal was presented for 15 or 12 years of service by Petty Officers and ratings of the Royal Naval Reserve, Royal Naval Volunteer Reserve, Royal Naval Auxiliary Sick Berth Reserve, Royal Fleet Reserve, and Royal Naval Wireless Auxiliary Reserve. Established in 1909, the medal was replaced by the Volunteer Reserves Service Medal.

The Royal Fleet Reserve LS&GCM was awarded for 15 years combined Active and Reserve Service and was discontinued on 1 April 2000. This particular LS&GC award was being discontinued, in order to bring the Royal Navy in line with the other two services, which did not separately recognise service in the regular reserves in such a way.

== Medal design ==
The medal is silver 36 millimetres (1.4 in) in diameter. The obverse bears the effigy of the reigning sovereign of the period. The first two, Edward VII and George V are in the uniform of the Admiral of the Fleet. The later monarchs' effigies are the coinage type profiles. The reverse depicts HMS Dreadnought with the motto DIUTURNE FIDELIS (Faithful Over Time) underneath. The ribbons of the forces varied over time and by force. In 1957, the Royal Naval Reserve and Royal Naval Volunteer Reserve were merged as the Royal Naval Reserve, and assumed a common ribbon.

Reserve Force	First ribbon	Second ribbon	Third ribbon
Royal Naval Reserve	1908-1941	1941-1957	1957-1999
Royal Naval Volunteer Reserve	1908-1919	1919-1966	
Royal Naval Auxiliary Sick Berth Reserve	1919-1943	1943-1949	
Royal Naval Wireless Auxiliary Reserve	1939-1957		
Royal Fleet Reserve	1922-1999		
