= Volunteer Officers' Decoration =

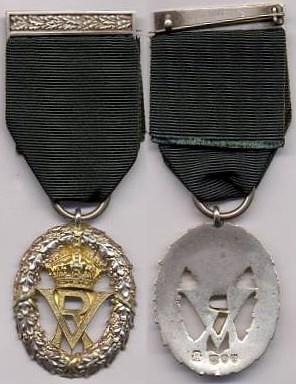
- Queen Victoria version
- Type: Military long service decoration
- Awarded for: Twenty years meritorious service
- Country: United Kingdom
- Presented by: the Monarch of the United Kingdom of Great Britain and Ireland, and Empress of India
- Eligibility: Officers of the Volunteer Force
- Post-nominals: VD
- Status: Discontinued in the UK in 1908, in the Dependencies in 1930
- Established: 1892
- First award: 1892
- Final award: 1907 in the UK, 1930 in Bermuda
- Ribbon bar

Order of wear
- Next (higher): Army Emergency Reserve Decoration
- Next (lower): Volunteer Long Service Medal
- Related: Volunteer Officers' Decoration for India and the Colonies

The Volunteer Officers' Decoration, post-nominal letters VD, was instituted in 1892 as an award for long and meritorious service by officers of the United Kingdom's Volunteer Force. Award of the decoration was discontinued in the United Kingdom when it was superseded by the Territorial Decoration in 1908, but it continued to be awarded in some Crown Dependencies until 1930.

The grant of the decoration was extended in 1894 by the institution of a separate new decoration, the Volunteer Officers' Decoration for India and the Colonies, that could be awarded to commissioned officers of all Volunteer Forces throughout the British Empire and India.

== Institution ==
The Volunteer Officers' Decoration, post-nominal letters VD and colloquially known as the Volunteer Decoration, was instituted by Queen Victoria's Royal Warrant on 25 July 1892. The decoration could be awarded to efficient and thoroughly capable officers of proven capacity for long and meritorious service in the part-time Volunteer Force of the United Kingdom.

== Award criteria ==
The qualifying period of service was twenty years. Half of any previous service in the Regular Army also counted towards qualification. The award did not confer any individual precedence, but entitled the recipient to use the post-nominal letters VD.

Recipients had to have been recommended for the award by the Commanding Officer of their Corps, and duly certified by the District Military Authorities in which the Corps was located as having been efficient and thoroughly capable officers, in every way deserving of such a decoration. In order to preserve the purity of the decoration, the name of any person on whom it had been conferred who was subsequently convicted of any act derogatory to his honour as an officer and gentleman, was immediately erased from the registry of individuals upon whom the decoration had been conferred.

The Volunteer Officers' Decoration could also be conferred upon any of the Princes of the Royal Family of Great Britain and Ireland.

== Colonial version ==
On 24 May 1894 the grant of the decoration was extended by Royal Warrant to commissioned officers of Volunteer Forces throughout the British Empire, defined as being India, the Dominion of Canada, the Crown Colonies and the Crown Dependencies. A separate new decoration was instituted, the Volunteer Officers' Decoration for India and the Colonies. This decoration was similar in design to the Volunteer Officers' Decoration, but bore the Royal Cypher "VRI" (Victoria Regina Imperatrix) instead of "VR" (Victoria Regina).

Even so, some Crown Dependencies awarded the Volunteer Officers' Decoration instead of the Colonial version, until the Efficiency Decoration was instituted in September 1930.

== Order of wear ==
In the order of wear prescribed by the British Central Chancery of the Orders of Knighthood, the Volunteer Officers' Decoration takes precedence after the Army Emergency Reserve Decoration and before the Volunteer Long Service Medal.

== Description ==
The decoration is an oval skeletal design and was struck in silver, with parts of the obverse in silver-gilt. It is 43 millimetres (1.69 inches) high and 35.5 millimetres (1.4 inches) wide with a ring suspender formed of silver wire.

Obverse

The obverse is an oak leaf wreath in silver, tied with gold, with the Royal Cypher below the Royal Crown, both in gold, in the centre.

Reverse

The reverse is plain with the hallmarks impressed at the bottom. The decoration was awarded unnamed, but was frequently unofficially engraved in various styles.

Ribbon

The ribbon is dark green and 1 1/2 inches (38 millimetres) in width and is suspended from a silver bar-brooch decorated with an oak leaf pattern.

== Versions ==
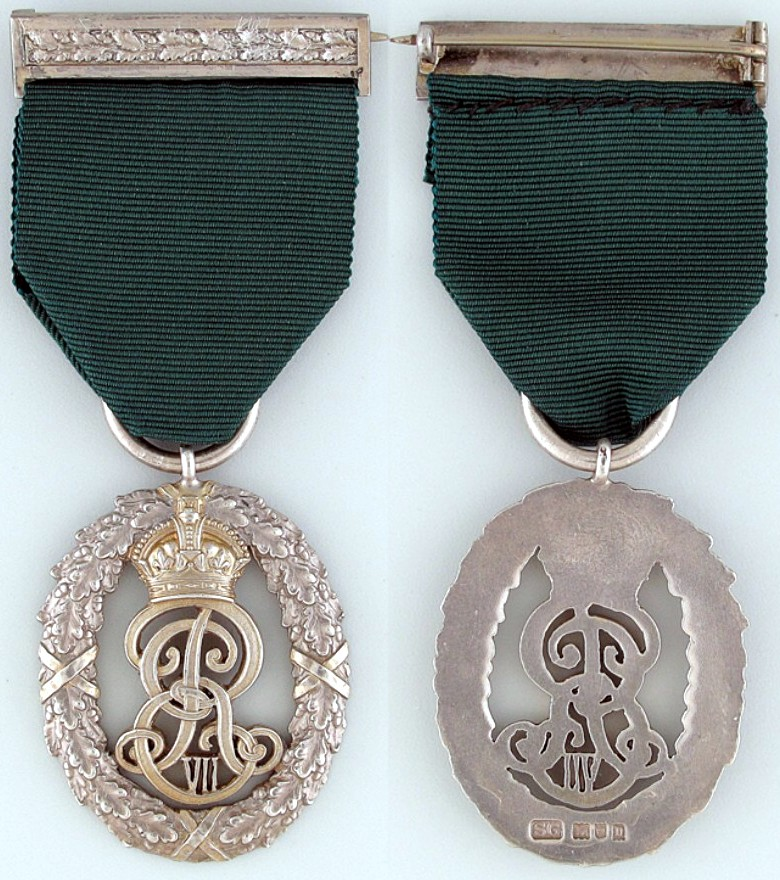
King Edward VII version

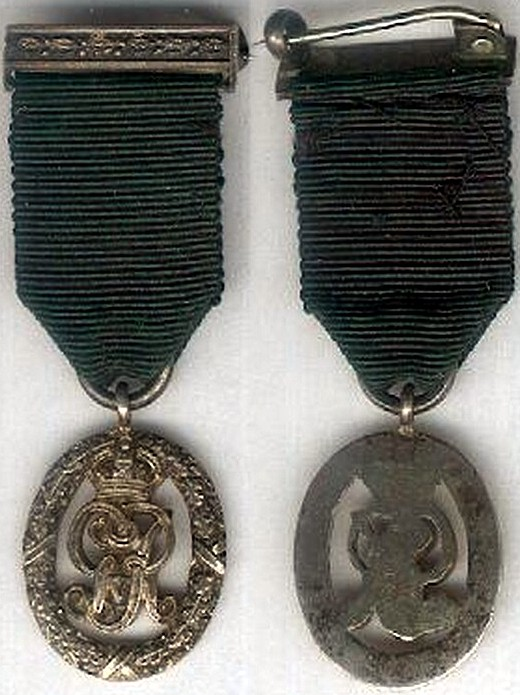
King George V version

Three versions of the decoration were struck. The original version of 1892 had the Royal Cypher "VR" of Queen Victoria below the Royal Crown in the centre.

The King Edward VII version, with his Royal Cypher "ER VII", was introduced after his succession to the throne in 1901 and ceased to be awarded to officers of the United Kingdom's Volunteer Force when it was superseded by the Territorial Decoration in 1908. It appears to have continued to be awarded in some Crown Dependencies until 1910.

The King George V version, with his Royal Cypher "GVR", was introduced after his succession to the throne in 1910. This version appears to have only been awarded in some Crown Dependencies, instead of the Volunteer Officers' Decoration for India and the Colonies.

== Discontinuation ==
The "Home" (i.e., British Isles) Volunteer Force was merged with the Yeomanry in 1908 to become the Territorial Force, which, unlike its predecessors, was not a voluntary force (i.e., its other ranks engaged for a term of service of four years and could not resign). At the same time, award of the Volunteer Officers' Decoration was discontinued in the United Kingdom and superseded by the new Territorial Decoration.

The Volunteer Officers' Decoration continued to be awarded in some colonies and Crown Dependencies (such as to officers of the Bermuda Volunteer Rifle Corps in the Imperial fortress colony of Bermuda, with awards for this unit continuing even after its re-organisation on Territorial Force lines in 1921) until the Efficiency Decoration was instituted in September 1930. The last colony or Crown dependency in which the decoration was awarded was Bermuda in 1930.
