= Efficiency Medal (disambiguation) =

Efficiency Medal may refer to:

- Efficiency Medal, awarded within the United Kingdom and the Commonwealth.
- Army Emergency Reserve Efficiency Medal.
- Efficiency Medal (New Zealand).
- Efficiency Medal (South Africa).
- Territorial Force Efficiency Medal.
- Territorial Efficiency Medal.
