= Efficiency Decoration (South Africa) =

- Second King George V version
- Type: Military long service decoration
- Awarded for: Twenty years service until 1949; Twelve years service from 1949
- Country: South Africa
- Presented by: the Monarch of the United Kingdom and the British Dominions, and Emperor of India
- Eligibility: Officers of the Citizen Force
- Post-nominals: ED
- Status: Discontinued in 1952
- Established: 1930
- Final award: 1952

Highlights
- Total: 886
- Ribbon bar

South African order of wear
- Next (higher): Medal for Long Service and Good Conduct (South Africa)
- Equivalent: Efficiency Decoration; Efficiency Decoration (Canada); Efficiency Decoration (New Zealand)
- Next (lower): Efficiency Medal (South Africa)

The Efficiency Decoration (South Africa), post-nominal letters ED, was instituted in 1930 for award to efficient and thoroughly capable part-time officers in the Citizen Force of the Union of South Africa after twenty years of service. The decoration superseded the Colonial Auxiliary Forces Officers' Decoration.

The decoration was replaced by the John Chard Decoration on 6 April 1952.

== Origin ==
In 1892, the Volunteer Officers' Decoration was instituted as an award for long and meritorious service by officers of the United Kingdom's Volunteer Force. In 1894, the grant of the decoration was extended to officers of volunteer forces throughout the British Empire by instituting a separate new decoration, the Volunteer Officers' Decoration for India and the Colonies. This decoration was superseded in 1899 by the Colonial Auxiliary Forces Officers' Decoration.

== Institution ==
The Efficiency Decoration was instituted by Royal Warrant on 23 September 1930 as a long service award for part-time officers of the Territorial Army of the United Kingdom and of the Auxiliary Military Forces of the British Dominions, Colonies and Protectorates and India. In South Africa, the decoration superseded the Colonial Auxiliary Forces Officers' Decoration.

The decoration bore a subsidiary title, inscribed on the bar-brooch, to denote whether the recipient qualified for its award while serving in the Territorial Army or in one of the other Auxiliary Military Forces of the Empire. The subsidiary title was inscribed on the bar-brooch of the decoration, "TERRITORIAL" in respect of the Territorial Army or the name of the applicable country in respect of other Auxiliary Military Forces. The South African version was unique, being the only one on which the subsidiary title was bilingual.

The equivalent award for other ranks was the Efficiency Medal (South Africa).

== Award criteria ==
The decoration could be awarded to part-time officers after twenty years of commissioned service, not necessarily continuous, as an efficient and thoroughly capable officer on the active list of the Citizen Force of the Union Defence Forces. Half of the time served in the ranks could be reckoned as qualifying service for the decoration. Service in West Africa, natives of West Africa and periods spent on leave excluded, and war service was reckoned two-fold as qualifying service for the decoration.

Recipients are entitled to use the post-nominal letters ED. A recipient who had earlier been awarded any Long Service and Good Conduct Medal or the Efficiency Medal, or a clasp to either, for service in the ranks, was not permitted to wear the medal or clasp together with the decoration until the full service periods prescribed for each medal or clasp as well as the decoration had been completed.

The decoration was initially only awarded to Citizen Force officers of the South African Army and South African Air Force. On 1 August 1942, when the South African Navy was established by the consolidation of the Seaward Defence Force and the South African Division of the Royal Naval Volunteer Reserve to create the South African Naval Forces, eligibility for the award of the decoration was extended to South African Naval Citizen Force officers.

From 1949, the required period of qualifying service was reduced to a minimum twelve years of commissioned service. In respect of officers whose service terminated before 3 September 1939, the qualifying period of commissioned service remained twenty years. At the same time, a clasp was instituted which could be awarded upon the completion of each further period of six years of qualifying service.

== Order of wear ==
In the order of wear prescribed by the British Central Chancery of the Orders of Knighthood, the Efficiency Decoration (South Africa) ranks on par with the Efficiency Decoration and takes precedence after the Ceylon Armed Services Long Service Medal and before the Territorial Efficiency Medal.

=== South Africa ===
With effect from 6 April 1952, when a new South African set of decorations and medals was instituted to replace the British awards used to date, the older British decorations and medals which were applicable to South Africa continued to be worn in the same order of precedence but, with the exception of the Victoria Cross, took precedence after all South African decorations and medals awarded to South Africans on or after that date. Of the official British medals which were applicable to South Africans, the Efficiency Decoration (South Africa) takes precedence as shown.

- Preceded by the Colonial Auxiliary Forces Long Service Medal.
- Succeeded by the Efficiency Medal (South Africa).

== Description ==
The decoration is an oval skeletal design and was struck in silver, with parts of the obverse in silver-gilt. The original badge is the same as that of the King George V version of the Territorial Decoration, 43 millimetres (1.69 inches) high and 35.5 millimetres (1.40 inches) wide, but with the decoration's subsidiary title inscribed on the bar-brooch.

The second King George V and subsequent versions are of a new design, 54 millimetres (2.13 inches) high and 37 millimetres (1.46 inches) wide, with a 15 millimetres (0.59 inches) diameter ring suspender, formed of silver wire, which passes through a small ring affixed to the top back of the crown.

=== Obverse ===
The obverse is an oval oak leaf wreath in silver, tied with gold, with the Royal Cypher of the reigning monarch in the centre below the Royal Crown, both in gold. Three versions of the decoration could be awarded.

- On the decoration's original King George V version of 1930, the Royal Cypher "GVR", for "Georgivs V Rex", and the crown are both encircled by the wreath.
- The second King George V version has his Royal Cypher "GRI" for "Georgivs Rex Imperator". On this and the subsequent version, the crown is located higher and covers the top part of the wreath.
- The King George VI version, with his Royal Cypher "GVIR" for "Georgivs VI Rex", was introduced after his succession to the throne in 1936.

=== Subsidiary title ===
The medal ribbon is suspended from a rectangular silver bar-brooch, inscribed "UNION OF SOUTH AFRICA" and "UNIE VAN SUID-AFRIKA" in two lines. On the reverse, the bar-brooch is impressed with silver hallmarks.

=== Reverse ===
The reverse is smooth and undecorated, with the rank, initials and surname of the recipient impressed around the perimeter.

=== Clasps ===
The clasp has the Royal Cypher of King George VI (GVIR) in the centre, surmounted by the Royal Crown, with the year of the award impressed on the reverse. In undress uniform or when ribbon bars alone are worn, a recipient of one or more clasps would wear a silver rosette on the ribbon bar to denote each clasp.

=== Ribbon ===
The ribbon is 38 millimetres wide and dark green, with a 7 millimetres wide lime yellow band in the centre. It is identical to the ribbon of the superseded Territorial Decoration.

== Recipients ==
Altogether 886 awards of the Efficiency Decoration (South Africa) were made. Some notable recipients are:

- Field Marshal Jan Christiaan Smuts OM CH DTD ED KC FRS PC.

== Discontinuation ==
Award of the Efficiency Decoration (South Africa) was discontinued on 6 April 1952, when it was replaced by the John Chard Decoration, which could be awarded to all ranks of the Citizen Force for twenty years of efficient service and good conduct.
