= Air Efficiency Award =

Award instituted in 1942

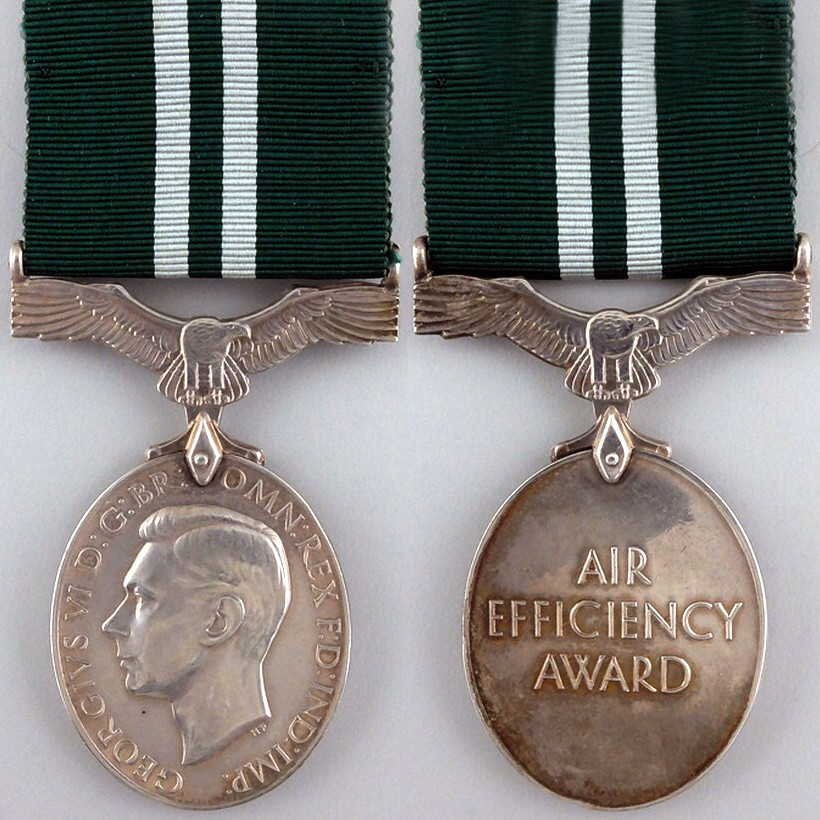
- First King George VI version
- Type: Military long service medal
- Awarded for: Ten years service
- Country: United Kingdom
- Presented by: the Monarch of the United Kingdom and the Dominions of the British Commonwealth, and Emperor of India
- Eligibility: Part-time Air Force officers, airmen and airwomen
- Post-nominals: AE (officers only)
- Clasps: Ten years additional service
- Status: Still current in New Zealand
- Established: 1942
- First award: 1942
- Ribbon bar

Order of wear
- Next (higher): Royal Naval Auxiliary Service Medal
- Next (lower): Volunteer Reserves Service Medal

The Air Efficiency Award, post-nominal letters AE for officers, was instituted in 1942. It could be awarded after ten years of meritorious service to officers, airmen and airwomen in the Auxiliary and Volunteer Air Forces of the United Kingdom and the Territorial Air Forces and Air Force Reserves of the Dominions, the Indian Empire, Burma, the Colonies and Protectorates.

The award of the decoration was discontinued in the United Kingdom on 1 April 1999, when it was superseded by the Volunteer Reserves Service Medal. The decoration is still being awarded in New Zealand, but between 1951 and 1975 it was superseded by local awards in other Dominions.

- In Canada, the Air Efficiency Award was superseded by the Canadian Forces' Decoration in 1951.
- In South Africa, it was superseded by the John Chard Medal in 1952.
- In Australia, it was superseded by the National Medal in 1975.

== Institution ==
The Air Efficiency Award was instituted by Royal Warrant on 17 August 1942 as a long service award for part-time Auxiliary and Volunteer Air Force officers, airmen and airwomen in the United Kingdom, the Indian Empire, Burma, the British Colonies and Protectorates and those British Dominions whose governments desired to make use of the award. A clasp to the Award was subsequently instituted.

Since, at the time, the Air Efficiency Award was unique, being a decoration which could be conferred on officers and other ranks alike in recognition of the unique relationship between the officers and men of an aircraft crew, recipients were initially not granted the right to use post-nominal letters. The use of the post-nominal letters "AE" was only approved at some date between 27 October 1964 and 28 October 1982, and only in respect of officer recipients.

Several Dominions adopted the Air Efficiency Award.

- In Australia, approximately 400 Air Efficiency Awards were made between 1942 and 1975.
- In Canada, the Air Efficiency Award was adopted in 1942 and, in respect of part-time officers, airmen and airwomen of the Royal Canadian Air Force Auxiliary and the Auxiliary Active Air Force Reserve, replaced the Efficiency Decoration and Efficiency Medal. It was originally planned that the Canadian version of the medal would have a bar inscribed "CANADA" on the suspension, but this never materialised and the regular British version was awarded to Canadians.
- New Zealand adopted the Air Efficiency Award in 1942 and still awards it.
- South Africa adopted it and, in 1950, intended to introduce a bilingual version, with a scroll bar similar to that of the Efficiency Medal (South Africa) above the suspender and the inscriptions "AIR EFFICIENCY AWARD" and "TOEKENNING VIR BEKWAAMHEID (LUGMAG)" (Afrikaans: Award for Proficiency (Air Force)) on the reverse. This version also never materialised since, on 6 April 1952, a set of South African decorations and medals were instituted to replace all the British awards hitherto used.

The first conferments of the Air Efficiency Award were announced in the press on 25 December 1942.

== Award criteria ==
The period of reckoned service required to qualify for the award was ten years, of which at least five years of actual service had to have been in an Auxiliary or Volunteer Air Force of the United Kingdom or the Dominions, Colonies, Protectorates, India or Burma. The award could also be made to any Princes or Princesses of the Blood Royal.

The period of reckoned service required to qualify for the award of the clasp was a further ten years, subject to the same conditions as for the award of the medal. Further clasps could be awarded upon completion of each additional ten years of qualifying service.

For those airmen and airwomen whose service commenced before 3 September 1939, the time served was reckoned as time-and-a-half. Service on flying duties with the Royal Air Force or any other Commonwealth Air Force during the Second World War between 3 September 1939 and 2 September 1945 was reckoned as treble time. Service on other than flying duties was normally reckoned as single time, but while embodied within the Royal Air Force or any Commonwealth Air Force during the Second World War, such service was reckoned as double time.

For service which commenced after 1 December 1948, service in a flying category was reckoned as time-and-a-half, while service in other than a flying category was reckoned as single time.

== Order of wear ==
In the order of wear prescribed by the British Central Chancery of the Orders of Knighthood, the Air Efficiency Award takes precedence after the Royal Naval Auxiliary Service Medal and before the Volunteer Reserves Service Medal.

=== South Africa ===
With effect from 6 April 1952, when a new South African set of decorations and medals was instituted to replace the British awards used to date, the older British decorations and medals which were applicable to South Africa continued to be worn in the same order of precedence but, with the exception of the Victoria Cross, took precedence after all South African decorations and medals awarded to South Africans on or after that date. Of the official British medals which were applicable to South Africans, the Air Efficiency Award takes precedence as shown.

- Preceded by the Royal Naval Volunteer Reserve Long Service and Good Conduct Medal.
- Succeeded by the Union of South Africa Commemoration Medal.

== Description ==
The medal was struck in silver and is oval, 38 millimetres (1.5 inches) high and 32 millimetres (1.26 inches) wide, with a raised rim on each side. It is suspended from a silver bar in the form of an eagle in flight, looking towards its left, affixed to the medal by means of a single-toe claw and a pin through the upper edge of the medal.

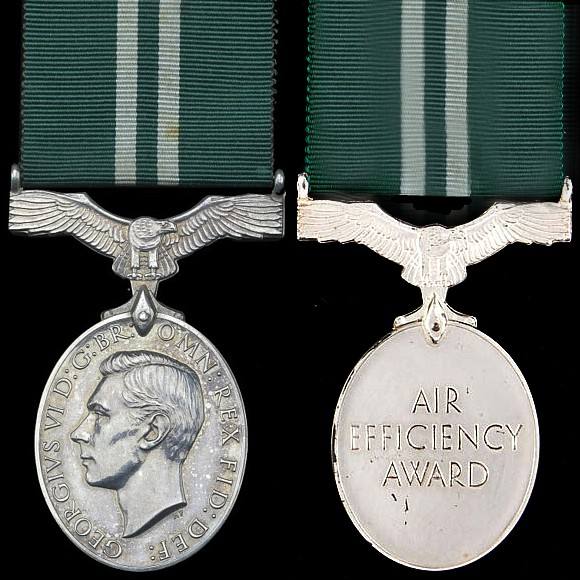
Second King George VI version

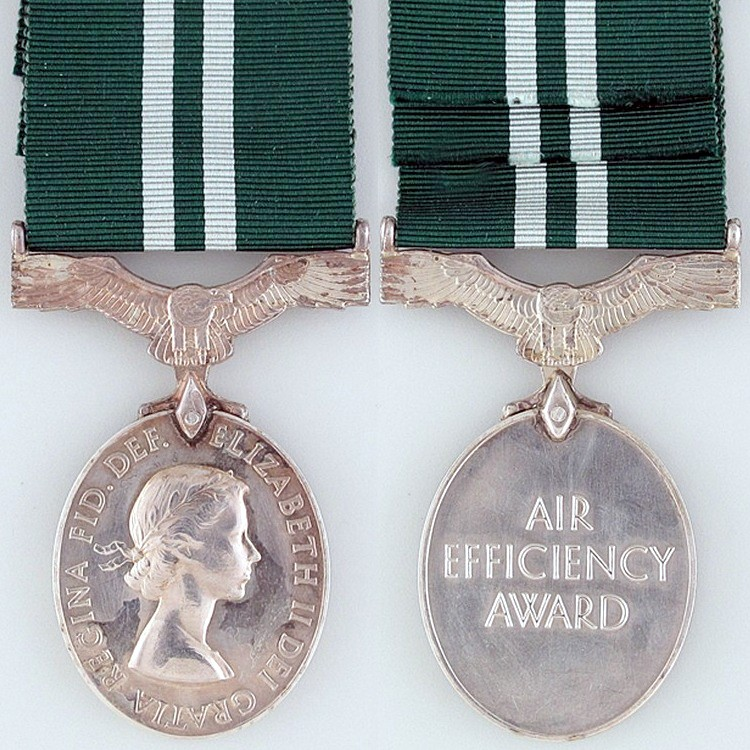
Second Queen Elizabeth II version

Obverse

The obverse bears the uncrowned effigy of the reigning monarch. Four versions of the medal have been awarded.

- The original King George VI version has his coinage type effigy and is circumscribed "GEORGIVS VI D: G: BR: OMN: REX F: D: IND: IMP:" reading around from the bottom. The initials "HP" below the truncation of the King's neck are those of the designer of the obverse of the medal, Thomas Humphrey Paget, an English medal and coin designer.
- The second King George VI version was introduced in 1949, after his title "Emperor of India" was abandoned and the reference to India was omitted from the medal inscription. This version has the same effigy as the first, but is circumscribed "GEORGIVS VI D: G: BR: OMN: REX FID: DEF:" reading around from the bottom.
- The first Queen Elizabeth II version was introduced after her succession to the throne in 1952. The effigy was designed by Mary Gillick OBE and was also used on general-circulation coinage for the United Kingdom from 1953, as well as in cameo form on British commemorative postage stamps since 1966.
- The second Queen Elizabeth II version was introduced after her coronation in 1953. This version has the same effigy as the first, but is circumscribed "ELIZABETH II DEI GRATIA REGINA FID. DEF." reading around from the top.

Reverse

The reverse is smooth and is inscribed "AIR EFFICIENCY AWARD" in three lines.

Clasp

The clasp was struck in silver and bore an eagle with outstretched wings, surmounted by a crown.

Ribbon

The ribbon is 38 millimetres wide, with a 13½ millimetres wide dark green band and a 4 millimetres wide pale blue band, repeated in reverse order and separated by a 3 millimetres wide dark green band.

== Discontinuation ==
In the United Kingdom and some countries of the Commonwealth, the Air Efficiency Award was gradually superseded by new medals.

- Canada was the first to institute another medal to supersede the Air Efficiency Award on 7 June 1951, when the Canadian Forces' Decoration was first awarded. Members who had joined the Royal Canadian Air Force Auxiliary or Auxiliary Active Air Force Reserve before 1 September 1939, however, still remained eligible for the award of the Air Efficiency Award.
- In South Africa, the medal was superseded on 6 April 1952 by the John Chard Medal, which could be awarded to all ranks of the Citizen Force in all Arms of the Service for twelve years of efficient service and good conduct.
- In Australia, it was superseded by the National Medal in 1975.
- Award of the decoration was discontinued in the United Kingdom on 1 April 1999, when it was superseded by the Volunteer Reserves Service Medal. The Air Efficiency Award could still be awarded for qualifying service ending before 1 April 1999.

New Zealand continues to award the Air Efficiency Award.
