= Efficiency Medal (South Africa) =

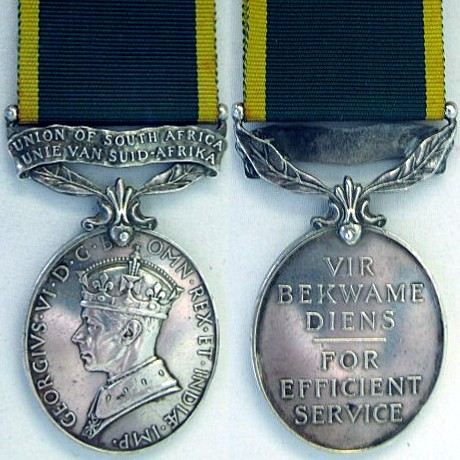
- King George VI version
- Type: Military long service medal
- Awarded for: Twelve years of efficient service
- Country: Union of South Africa
- Presented by: the Monarch of the United Kingdom and the British Dominions, and Emperor of India
- Eligibility: Part-time other ranks and some officers
- Clasps: For further periods of 6 years service
- Status: Discontinued in 1952
- Established: 1930
- Final award: 1952
- Ribbon Bar

South African order of wear
- Next (higher): Efficiency Decoration (South Africa)
- Equivalent: Efficiency Medal; Efficiency Medal (New Zealand)
- Next (lower): Special Reserve Long Service and Good Conduct Medal

The Efficiency Medal (South Africa) was instituted in 1930 for award to part-time warrant officers, non-commissioned officers and men after twelve years of efficient service on the active list of the Citizen Force of the Union of South Africa. At the same time, a clasp was instituted for award to holders of the medal upon completion of further periods of six years of efficient service. The medal superseded the Colonial Auxiliary Forces Long Service Medal.

The Efficiency Medal (South Africa) was superseded by the John Chard Medal in 1952.

== Origin ==
In 1896, the Volunteer Long Service Medal for India and the Colonies was instituted by Queen Victoria. It was superseded by the Colonial Auxiliary Forces Long Service Medal in 1899.

== Institution ==
The Efficiency Medal (South Africa) was instituted by Royal Warrant on 23 September 1930, as a long service award for part-time warrant officers, non-commissioned officers and men of the Citizen Force of the Union Defence Forces. At the same time, a clasp was instituted, for award to recipients of the medal upon completion of further periods of efficient service.

The medal bears a subsidiary title to denote that the recipient qualified for its award while serving in the Citizen Force in South Africa. The subsidiary title, in English and Afrikaans, is inscribed on a scroll bar attached to the medal suspender.

The similar award for officers was the Efficiency Decoration (South Africa).

== Award criteria ==
The medal could be awarded to part-time warrant officers, non-commissioned officers and men after twelve years of continuous efficient service as a volunteer on the active list of the Citizen Force. Service in West Africa, natives of West Africa and periods spent on leave excluded, and war service were reckoned two-fold as qualifying service for the medal. Service during the period from 3 September 1939 to 1 March 1950 inclusive need not have been continuous, while breaks in service under certain specified conditions, though not counting as qualifying service, were not considered as a break in the twelve years of continuous qualifying service for the medal.

Clasps could initially be awarded to holders of the medal upon completion of eighteen and twenty-four reckoned years of efficient service. This was amended on 26 August 1944 to authorise the award of additional clasps for each additional completed period of six years of efficient service after twenty-four years. When medals are not worn, recipients of clasps would wear a silver rosette on the ribbon bar to donate each clasp.

A further amendment, on 10 May 1946, made part-time officers who served during the Second World War also eligible for the award of the medal and clasp, provided they were serving on the active list of the Citizen Force on 2 September 1939 and were embodied or called up for war service. The reason for this amendment originated from the anomaly that, during the war, a large number of officers were commissioned from the ranks, and merely by the fact that they were so promoted owing to their efficiency, would be denied the right to the Efficiency Medal. Such officers were allowed to reckon their service as officers as qualifying service for the medal and clasps. Officers who had already qualified for the award of the Efficiency Decoration before that date were, however, not eligible.

The medal was initially only awarded to Citizen Force members of the South African Army and South African Air Force. On 1 August 1942, when the South African Navy was established by the consolidation of the Seaward Defence Force and the South African Division of the Royal Naval Volunteer Reserve into the South African Naval Forces, eligibility for the award of the medal was extended to South African Naval Citizen Force members.

== Order of wear ==
In the order of wear prescribed by the British Central Chancery of the Orders of Knighthood, the Efficiency Medal (South Africa) ranks on par with the British Efficiency Medal and takes precedence after the Territorial Efficiency Medal and before the Special Reserve Long Service and Good Conduct Medal.

=== South Africa ===
With effect from 6 April 1952, when a new South African set of decorations and medals was instituted to replace the British awards used to date, the older British decorations and medals which were applicable to South Africa continued to be worn in the same order of precedence but, with the exception of the Victoria Cross, took precedence after all South African decorations and medals awarded to South Africans on or after that date. Of the official British medals which were applicable to South Africans, the Efficiency Medal (South Africa) takes precedence as shown.

- Preceded by the Efficiency Decoration (South Africa) (ED).
- Succeeded by the Decoration for Officers of the Royal Naval Volunteer Reserve (VRD).

== Description ==
The medal was struck in silver and is oval, 39 millimetres (1.54 inches) high and 32 millimetres (1.26 inches) wide. The fixed suspender bar, a pair of laurel leaves, is affixed to the medal by means of a single-toe claw and a horizontal pin through the upper edge of the medal. The suspender is decorated on the obverse with a scroll-pattern bar, inscribed with the name of the country. The name of the recipient was impressed on the rim of the medal.

Obverse

Three versions of the medal were produced for South Africa, but only the first two were awarded. The obverse has a raised rim on all three versions and bears the crowned effigy of the reigning monarch.

- The original version has the effigy of King George V in coronation robes and wearing the Tudor Crown. It is circumscribed "GEORGIVS•V•D•G•BRITT•OMN REX•ET•INDIÆ•IMP•". The initials "BM" at the bottom of the effigy are those of the designer of the obverse, Sir Bertram Mackennal KCVO, an Australian sculptor.
- The King George VI version was introduced after his succession to the throne in 1936 and has his effigy in coronation robes and wearing the Tudor Crown, facing left and circumscribed "GEORGIVS•VI•D•G•BR•OMN•REX•ET•INDIÆ•IMP•". It is identical to the first King George VI obverse design of the British Efficiency Medal. The initials "PM" below the effigy are those of the designer of the obverse, sculptor Percy Metcalfe CVO RDI.

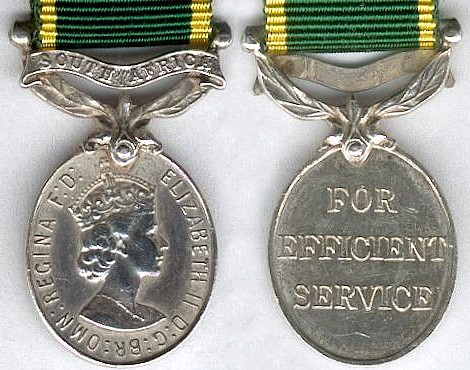
Queen Elizabeth II version

- The Queen Elizabeth II version was introduced after her succession to the throne in 1952 and has her effigy, facing right and wearing the Tudor Crown. It is circumscribed "ELIZABETH II D: G: BR: OMN: REGINA F: D:" reading around from the top. It is identical to the first Queen Elizabeth II obverse design of the British Efficiency Medal.

Scroll bar

Approved by a Royal Warrant dated 29 December 1939, the scroll bar inscription on the King George VI version of the medal was in English and Afrikaans, "UNION OF SOUTH AFRICA" and "UNIE VAN SUID-AFRIKA" in two lines. The scroll bar on the Queen Elizabeth II version was English only, but this medal was never awarded since it was superseded within a few months of the Queen's succession to the throne.

Reverse

The reverse is smooth with a raised rim and bears the inscription "FOR EFFICIENT SERVICE" in three lines. On the bilingual King George VI version, the Afrikaans and English inscriptions are "VIR BEKWAME DIENS" and "FOR EFFICIENT SERVICE", each language in three lines and the languages separated by a 13 millimetres long line.

Clasp

The clasp, struck in silver, is decorated with an embossed Tudor Crown and was designed to be sewn onto the medal ribbon.

Ribbon

The ribbon is 32 millimetres wide and dark green, edged with 3 millimetres wide lime yellow bands.

== Discontinuation ==
On 6 April 1952, the Efficiency Medal was superseded by the John Chard Medal, which could be awarded to all ranks after twelve years of continuous efficient service in the Citizen Force.
