= Colonial Auxiliary Forces Long Service Medal =

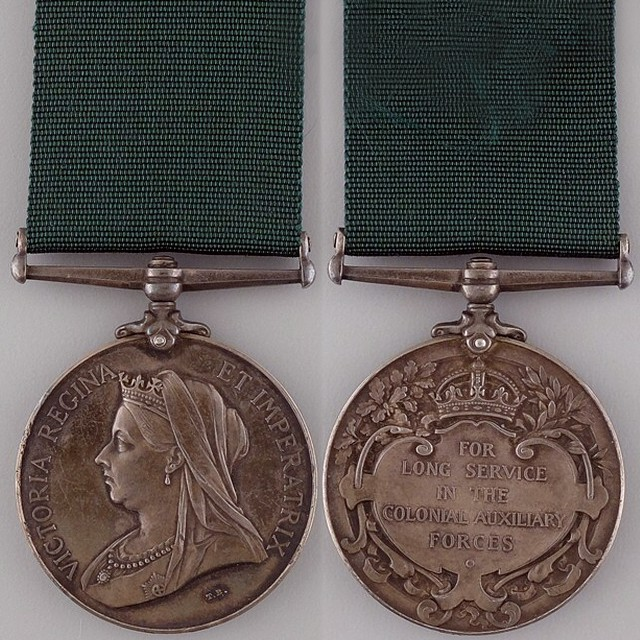
- Queen Victoria version
- Type: Military long service medal
- Awarded for: Twenty years service
- Country: United Kingdom
- Presented by: the Monarch of the United Kingdom of Great Britain and Ireland, and Empress of India
- Eligibility: All ranks of part-time Colonial Forces
- Status: Discontinued in 1930
- Established: 1899
- Final award: 1931
- Ribbon bar

Order of Wear
- Next (higher): Colonial Auxiliary Forces Officers' Decoration
- Next (lower): Medal for Good Shooting (Naval)
- Related: Volunteer Long Service Medal for India and the Colonies

The Colonial Auxiliary Forces Long Service Medal was instituted by Queen Victoria in 1899 as a military long service award for part-time members of all ranks in any of the organized military forces of the British Colonies, Dependencies and Protectorates throughout the British Empire. The medal gradually superseded the Volunteer Long Service Medal for India and the Colonies in all these territories, with the exception of the Isle of Man, Bermuda and the Indian Empire.

In 1930, the medal, along with the Volunteer Long Service Medal, the Volunteer Long Service Medal for India and the Colonies, the Militia Long Service Medal, the Special Reserve Long Service and Good Conduct Medal and the Territorial Efficiency Medal, were superseded by the Efficiency Medal in an effort to standardise recognition across the Empire.

== Origin ==
The Volunteer Long Service Medal was instituted in 1894 as an award for long service by other ranks in the part-time Volunteer Force of the United Kingdom. In 1896, the grant of this medal was extended by Queen Victoria to members of Volunteer Forces throughout the British Empire and a separate new medal was instituted, the Volunteer Long Service Medal for India and the Colonies.

== Institution ==
The Colonial Auxiliary Forces Long Service Medal was instituted by Queen Victoria's Royal Warrant of 18 May 1899. This medal could be awarded to part-time members of all ranks in recognition of long service in any of the organised military forces of the Dominion of Canada, the Crown Colonies and the Protectorates, whether designated as militia or volunteers or otherwise. The medal superseded the Volunteer Long Service Medal for India and the Colonies in all these territories, with the exception of the Isle of Man, Bermuda and the Indian Empire.

Adoption of the medal by the Colonies took place gradually. In the Colonies which would become the Union of South Africa in 1910, for example, it was adopted by the Colony of Natal in 1900, the Cape of Good Hope in 1901 and the Transvaal Colony in 1906. In Canada and New Zealand, the medal was authorised in 1902.

== Award criteria ==
The medal could be awarded for twenty years of service as a part-time member of any rank in any of the Colonial Auxiliary Forces. Qualifying service could be had by serving in the forces of more than one Colony or Protectorate. Service in the Militia and Volunteer Forces of the United Kingdom was also reckonable, so long as at least half of all qualifying service had been rendered in the forces of the Dominion, Colonies or Protectorates. Service on the West Coast of Africa counted as double time. Service on the permanent staff was not reckonable.

Officers holding the medal who were subsequently awarded the Colonial Auxiliary Forces Officers' Decoration were not required to surrender the medal, but were not permitted to wear it any more until such time as the full periods of service required for both decoration and medal were completed.

On 25 January 1923, the Royal Warrant was amended in respect of part-time members who had actually served, or accepted the obligation of serving, beyond the boundaries of the Dominions, Colonies, Dependencies or Protectorates during the First World War. Such service on the active list was reckoned two-fold as qualifying service towards the requisite twenty years, whether such service was in the Naval Forces, Military Forces or Air Forces.

== Order of wear ==
In the order of wear prescribed by the British Central Chancery of the Orders of Knighthood, the Colonial Auxiliary Forces Long Service Medal takes precedence after the Colonial Auxiliary Forces Officers' Decoration and before the Medal for Good Shooting (Naval).

=== South Africa ===
With effect from 6 April 1952, when a new South African set of decorations and medals was instituted to replace the British awards used to date, the older British decorations and medals which were applicable to South Africa continued to be worn in the same order of precedence but, with the exception of the Victoria Cross, took precedence after all South African decorations and medals awarded to South Africans on or after that date. Of the official British medals which were applicable to South Africans, the Colonial Auxiliary Forces Long Service Medal takes precedence as shown.

- Preceded by the Colonial Auxiliary Forces Officers' Decoration (VD).
- Succeeded by the Efficiency Decoration (South Africa) (ED).

== Description ==
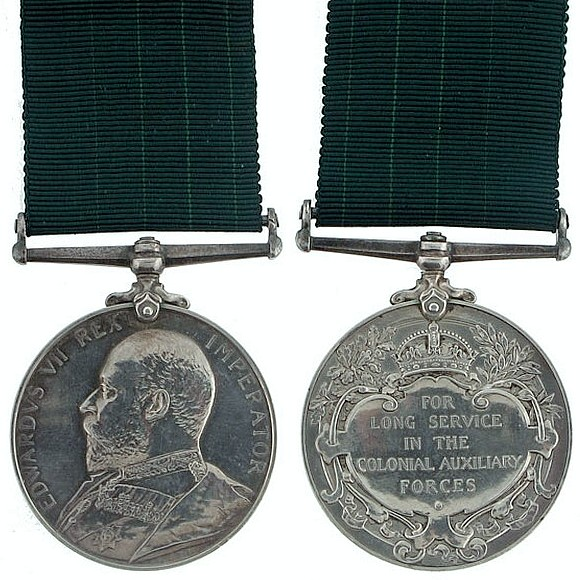
King Edward VII version

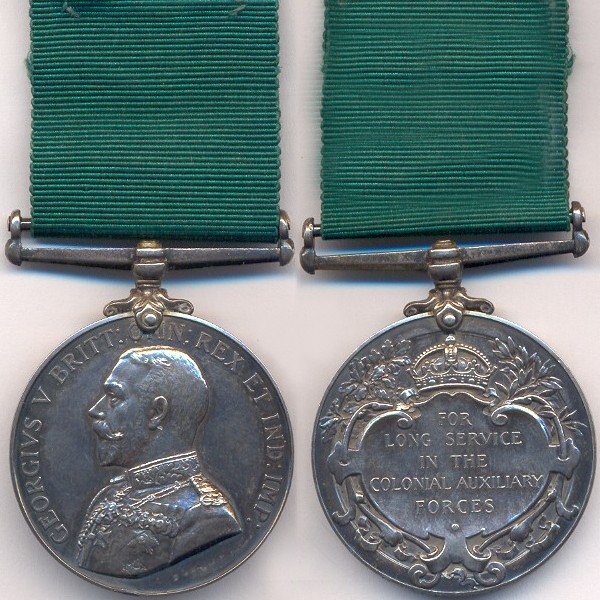
King George V version

The medal was struck in silver and is a disk, 1.42 inches (36 millimetres) in diameter, with a raised rim on each side. It is suspended from a plain, straight, swivelling silver bar, affixed to the medal by means of a single-toe claw and a pin through the upper edge of the medal, with double scroll claw supports on the rim.

Obverse

The obverse of the medal depicts the reigning monarch. Three obverse versions of the medal were struck.

- The original Queen Victoria version of 1899 has a diademed and veiled (widowed) effigy of the Queen, facing left, circumscribed with the legend "VICTORIA REGINA ET IMPERATRIX". The initials "TB" of medallist Sir Thomas Brock KCB RA are in the field below the bust.
- The King Edward VII version, introduced after his succession to the throne in 1901, displays his effigy in Field Marshal's uniform, facing left, circumscribed with the legend "EDWARDVS VII REX IMPERATOR". The initials "DES" of medallist George William de Saulles are in the field below the bust.
- The King George V version, introduced after his succession to the throne in 1910, shows the King in Field Marshal's uniform, facing left, and is circumscribed with the legend "GEORGIVS V BRITT: OMN: REX ET IND: IMP:". The initials "BM" of Australian medallist Sir Edgar Bertram Mackennal KCVO appear under the shoulder of the bust.

Reverse

The reverse shows an ornamental shield bearing the legend "FOR LONG SERVICE IN THE COLONIAL AUXILIARY FORCES" in five lines. Above the shield is the Imperial Crown with a spray of oak leaves to the left and a spray of laurel to the right.

Ribbon

The ribbon is plain dark green and 1 1/4 inches (32 millimetres) wide. The same ribbon was used for the Volunteer Long Service Medal, the Volunteer Long Service Medal for India and the Colonies and the Colonial Auxiliary Forces Officers Decoration.

== Discontinuation ==
The Colonial Auxiliary Forces Long Service Medal, along with the Volunteer Long Service Medal, the Volunteer Long Service Medal for India and the Colonies, the Militia Long Service Medal, the Special Reserve Long Service and Good Conduct Medal and the Territorial Efficiency Medal, were superseded by the Efficiency Medal on 23 September 1930 in an effort to standardise recognition for part-time service across the Empire by the award of one medal.
