= Imperial Yeomanry Long Service Medal =

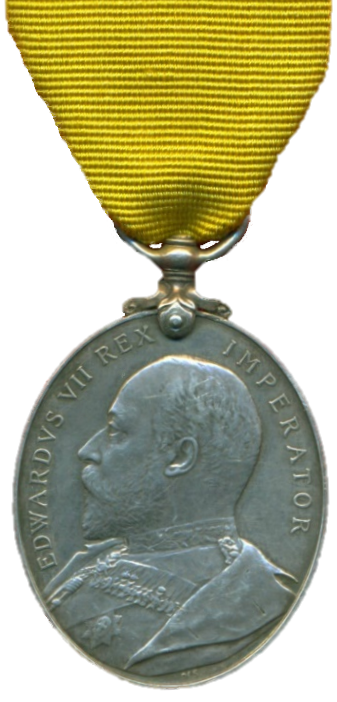
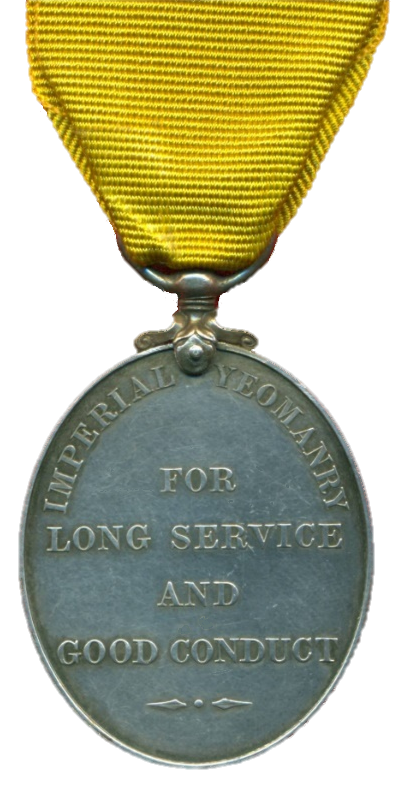
- Obverse and reverse of the medal
- Type: Long service and good conduct medal
- Awarded for: Awarded for 10 years service and attending 10 annual camps.
- Presented by: the United Kingdom
- Eligibility: Members of the Imperial Yeomanry serving on or after 9 November 1904.
- Established: 1904
- Final award: 1908

Highlights
- Total: 1,674
- Ribbon bar

Order of Wear
- Next (higher): Militia Long Service Medal
- Next (lower): Territorial Decoration

The Imperial Yeomanry Long Service Medal was a long service medal awarded by the United Kingdom. It is no longer awarded.

== Eligibility ==
Authorised by King Edward VII under Army Order No. 211 of 1904, the medal was awarded to troopers and non-commissioned officers in the Imperial Yeomanry for 10 years service and attending 10 annual camps. Any previous full time service in the Regular Army did not count towards this medal, although service in other volunteer and auxiliary forces could be counted, provided that five years immediately preceding the award were served in the Yeomanry.

In 1908, the Imperial Yeomanry along with the Volunteer Force were transferred to the newly created Territorial Force. The medal was then superseded by the Territorial Force Efficiency Medal.

Awards were published in Army Orders, with a total of 1,674 medals awarded, to men in over fifty different Yeomanry regiments, including 951 awards when the medal was first established.

Among the recipients was the military artist Harry Payne, who served with the Queen's Own West Kent Yeomanry.

== Appearance ==
The Imperial Yeomanry Long Service and Good Conduct Medal is an oval shaped silver medal with a fixed ring suspender at the top. The obverse depicts the bust of King Edward VII in uniform facing left. Around the top edge is the legend, EDWARDVS VII REX IMPERATOR. The reverse bears the words IMPERIAL YEOMANRY FOR LONG SERVICE AND GOOD CONDUCT. The medal hangs from a 32 mm light yellow ribbon threaded through the top ring suspender.

The medal was issued with the recipient's name, rank and unit impressed on the rim.
