= Royal Naval Auxiliary Service Long Service Medal =

- Ribbon bar of the medal
- Type: Long service medal
- Awarded for: At least 12 years of active service
- Presented by: the United Kingdom Royal Naval Auxiliary Service
- Eligibility: Members of the Royal Naval Auxiliary Service
- Established: July 1965

Order of Wear
- Next (higher): Royal Naval Wireless Auxiliary Reserve Long Service and Good Conduct Medal
- Next (lower): Air Efficiency Award

The Royal Naval Auxiliary Service Long Service Medal was an award of the Royal Naval Auxiliary Service. The medal recognized 12 years of service, with bars being awarded for 12 subsequent years of service.

== Appearance ==
The medal is 36 mm in diameter and made of cupro-nickel. The obverse depicts the crowned effigy of Elizabeth II. Around the edge are the words in relief ELIZABETH II DEI GRATIA REGINA F·D. The reverse bears an anchor surmounted by a naval crown surrounded by a wreath. Around the edge are the words in relief ROYAL NAVAL AUXILIARY SERVICE LONG SERVICE. Recipient's names are impressed upon the edge of the medal in capital letters.

The medal is suspended from a dark blue ribbon with a narrow central green stripe. Near the edges are narrow green stripes bordered in white.
