= Efficiency Decoration (New Zealand) =

- Ribbon bar of the decoration
- Awarded for: 12 years continuous and efficient service
- Country: New Zealand
- Eligibility: Officers of the New Zealand Territorial Force
- Post-nominals: ED
- Status: Currently awarded
- Established: 1930

Order of Wear
- Next (higher): New Zealand Customs Service Medal
- Next (lower): Efficiency Medal

The Efficiency Decoration is a medal awarded to New Zealand military officers. This medal is awarded to officers who have both served for twelve years continuously and been models of efficiency in that time. First awarded in 1931, it was a replacement for the Colonial Auxiliary Forces Officers' Decoration, which itself was only 29 years old in 1931, being first awarded in 1902. Recipients of this medal are also given the designation of 'ED' to use after their name.

== See also ==
- Efficiency Decoration
- Efficiency Medal
