= Territorial Decoration =

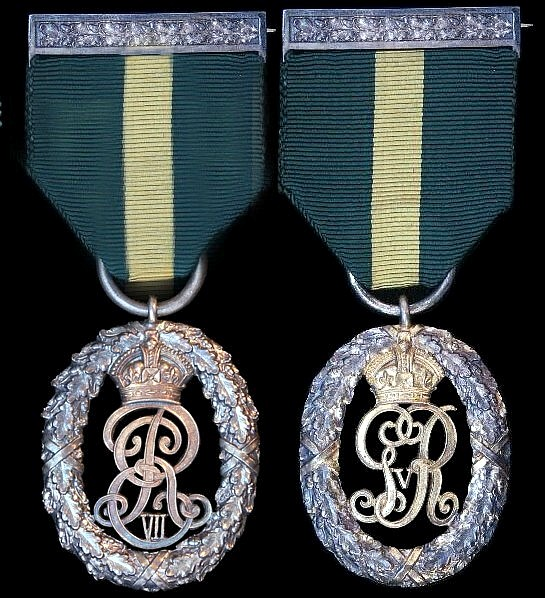
- King Edward VII (left) and King George V (right) versions
- Type: Military long service decoration
- Awarded for: Granted for a minimum of 20 years commissioned service, with service in the ranks counting half and war service counting double.
- Description: as follows: Ribbons; Regular: 38mm dark green with a central yellow stripe.; Honourable Artillery Company: Half blue, half scarlet with yellow edges.; Metal = Silver and silver-gilt; Size = Height 46mm; max.width 35mm; Shape = Skeletal with crowned monogram of sovereign, surrounded by oak wreath with a ring suspension.
- Presented by: the Monarch of the United Kingdom and the British Dominions, and Emperor of India
- Eligibility: Territorial Force, and later the Territorial Army - Commissioned Officers
- Status: This award: Superseded the Volunteer Officers' Decoration in the United Kingdom.; Was superseded by the Efficiency Decoration
- Established: 1908 (29 September)

Highlights
- Total recipients: 4,783
- Regular and HAC ribbon bars

The Territorial Decoration (TD) was a military medal of the United Kingdom awarded for long service in the Territorial Force and its successor, the Territorial Army.

This award superseded the Volunteer Officer's Decoration when the Territorial Force was formed on 1 April 1908, following the enactment of the Territorial and Reserve Forces Act 1907, (7 Edw.7, c.9) which was a large reorganisation of the old Volunteer Army and the remaining units of militia and Yeomanry. However, the Militia were transferred to the Special Reserve rather than becoming part of the Territorial Force. Recipients of this award are entitled to use the letters "TD" after their name (post-nominal).

== Criteria ==
The original criterion was for a minimum of 20 years service (subsequently reduced to 12 years service) in the Territorial Force and Territorial Army, with war service counting double and service in the ranks counting half.

In 1930 the new Efficiency Decoration or ‘ED’ was introduced to be awarded to all three services. When the ED was awarded to a Territorial Army officer it was officially known as Efficiency Decoration (Territorial), but it continued to be known informally as the Territorial Decoration and the recipient officially used the letters TD after their name.

The Efficiency Decoration was itself replaced in 1999 by the Volunteer Reserves Service Medal, awarded to all ranks in all services.

== Honourable Artillery Company ==
For members of the Honourable Artillery Company the ribbon differed, being a half blue, half scarlet ribbon, with yellow edges. This distinction was bestowed by King Edward VII for the Volunteer Long Service And Good Conduct Medal and the honour extended to the same medals under the Territorial designations. The HAC ribbon colours were the household colours of King Edward VII.

== Other details ==
Note that this medal is separate from the Territorial Force Imperial Service Badge.

The equivalent award for the ranks was the Territorial Force Efficiency Medal (1908–1921), the Territorial Efficiency Medal (1921–1930), and the Efficiency Medal (1930–1999).
