= Efficiency Medal (New Zealand) =

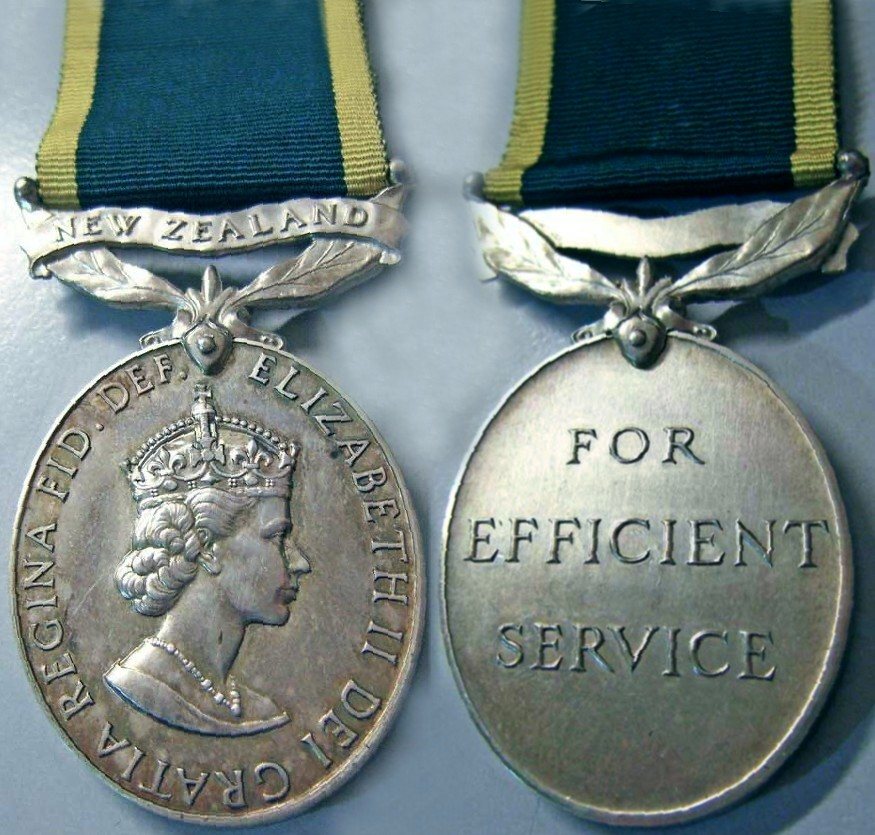
- Queen Elizabeth II version
- Awarded for: 12 years continuous and efficient service
- Country: New Zealand
- Eligibility: Officers of the New Zealand Territorial Force
- Post-nominals: None
- Status: Currently awarded
- Established: 1930
- Ribbon bar

Order of Wear
- Next (higher): Efficiency Decoration (New Zealand)
- Next (lower): Royal New Zealand Naval Reserve Decoration

The Efficiency Medal is a long service award for warrant officers, non-commissioned officers, and other ranks of the New Zealand Territorial Force. It is awarded for 12 years of continuous and efficient service. First awarded in 1931, it was a replacement for the Colonial Auxiliary Forces Long Service Medal, which was first awarded in 1902. New Zealand is one of the few countries that continues to award the Efficiency Medal.

== See also ==
- Efficiency Decoration
- Efficiency Medal
