= John Chard Medal =

- Type: Military long service medal
- Awarded for: Until 1986: 12 years service From 1986: 10 years service
- Country: South Africa
- Presented by: the Monarch of the United Kingdom and the Commonwealth realms, from 31 May 1961 by the State President of South Africa, and from 10 May 1994 by the President of South Africa
- Eligibility: Members of the Citizen Force
- Post-nominals: none like the Efficiency Medal (South Africa)
- Status: Discontinued in 2003
- Established: 1952
- Ribbon bar

SADF pre-1994 & SANDF post-2002 orders of wear
- Next (higher): SADF precedence: Permanent Force Good Service Medal; SANDF precedence: Permanent Force Good Service Medal
- Next (lower): SADF succession: Good Service Medal, Bronze; SANDF succession: Good Service Medal, Bronze

The John Chard Medal is a military long service medal which was instituted by the Union of South Africa on 6 April 1952. Until 1986, it was awarded to members of the Citizen Force of the South African Defence Force for twelve years of efficient service and good conduct. The period of qualifying service was reduced to ten years in 1986.

== The South African military ==
The Union Defence Forces (UDF) were established in 1912 and renamed the South African Defence Force (SADF) in 1958. On 27 April 1994, it was integrated with six other independent forces into the South African National Defence Force (SANDF).

== Institution ==
The John Chard Medal was instituted by Queen Elizabeth II on 6 April 1952, during the Tercentenary Van Riebeeck Festival, to replace the Efficiency Medal and the Air Efficiency Award which had been awarded to members of the Citizen Force between 1939 and 1952. It was named after John Chard VC, the lieutenant in command of the supply depot at Rorke's Drift during the Anglo-Zulu War, when it was attacked by Zulus in January 1879.

== Award criteria ==
The medal was awarded to all ranks of the Citizen Force for twelve years efficient service, not necessarily continuous. After a further eight years a recipient could qualify for the award of the John Chard Decoration (JCD). Upon being awarded the Decoration, the recipient was no longer allowed to wear the Medal.

From 1 July 1975, when the Good Service Medal, Bronze was instituted as the junior award in a new series of three medals for long service, for award to members of all three elements of the South African Defence Force, qualifying Citizen Force members who had not yet been awarded the John Chard Medal, could elect to receive the Good Service Medal, Bronze instead. Such members would thereafter be restricted to the series chosen.

The choice was therefore between, on the one hand, the new series of three medals, which would together eventually reward thirty years service and of which all three medals could be worn together, once awarded, and on the other hand the existing Citizen Force series of a Medal, a Decoration which entitled the recipient to the post-nominal letters JCD and, after thirty years, a clasp to the decoration, of which only the Decoration (and clasp) could be worn once awarded. In addition, the choice entailed that a member who qualified for the award of a Good Service Medal, Bronze after ten years service would have to elect to wait another two years for recognition, should the John Chard series of awards be preferred.

To resolve the issue, the period of qualifying service for the John Chard Medal was reduced to ten years in 1986, to bring the John Chard series of Citizen Force long service awards in line with the Good Service Medal series. In addition, recipients of the John Chard Decoration were now allowed to wear both the Decoration and the Medal. Members who elected to receive the John Chard series would, however, still be excluded from receiving the Good Service Medal, Gold after completing thirty years of qualifying service.

== Order of wear ==
With effect from 6 April 1952, when the John Chard Medal and several other new decorations and medals were instituted, these new awards took precedence before all earlier British orders, decorations and medals awarded to South Africans, with the exception of the Victoria Cross, which still took precedence before all other awards. The other older British awards continued to be worn in the order prescribed by the British Central Chancery of the Orders of Knighthood.

The position of the John Chard Medal in the official order of precedence was revised three times after 1975, to accommodate the inclusion or institution of new decorations and medals, first upon the integration into the South African National Defence Force on 27 April 1994, again when decorations and medals were belatedly instituted in April 1996 for the two former non-statutory forces, the Azanian People's Liberation Army and Umkhonto we Sizwe, and again when a new series of military orders, decorations and medals was instituted in South Africa on 27 April 2003. Its position in the military order of precedence remained unchanged upon all these occasions.

South African Defence Force until 26 April 1994

- Official SADF order of precedence:
  - Preceded by the Permanent Force Good Service Medal.
  - Succeeded by the Good Service Medal, Bronze.
- Official national order of precedence:
  - Preceded by the Medal for Faithful Service in the Railways Police.
  - Succeeded by the Police Medal for Faithful Service.

South African National Defence Force from 27 April 1994

- Official SANDF order of precedence:
  - Preceded by the Permanent Force Good Service Medal of the Republic of South Africa.
  - Succeeded by the Good Service Medal, Bronze of the Republic of South Africa.
- Official national order of precedence:
  - Preceded by the Prisons Medal for Faithful Service, Bronze of the Republic of Transkei.
  - Succeeded by the Police Medal for Faithful Service of the Republic of South Africa.

== Description ==
Initially all South African military orders, decorations and medals were minted by the South African Mint, but with effect from c. 1980, the manufacturing of all new awards as well as the further production of older awards were put out to tender by private enterprises. Since the tooling of the older awards was retained by the Mint, private manufacturers had to manufacture their own tooling, which resulted in several variations in appearance. Poor quality control and cost cutting by manufacturers resulted in the acceptance and award of a large number of medals which were less than 3 millimetres thick, with no raised rim on the reverse and with the suspender struck as an integral part of the medal, such as the one depicted.

No raised rim on reverse and integral suspender

Obverse

The John Chard Medal is an oval medallion struck in bronze, 39 millimetres wide, 51 millimetres high and 3 millimetres thick. It depicts a tree, the river and the mission station at Rorke's Drift in Natal, the scene of the 1879 battle in which Lieutenant Chard and ten of his men won the Victoria Cross, and is inscribed "RORKE'S DRIFT 1879". The scene is surrounded by the inscriptions "JOHN CHARD" at the top and "MEDALJE : MEDAL" at the bottom.

Reverse

The reverse has the pre-1994 South African Coat of Arms and the original medals, minted by the South African Mint, have a raised rim and a separately struck suspender which is soldered to the top of the medal, such as the one depicted at the top of the page. The medal number was impressed or engraved at the bottom on the rim. Medals awarded before the advent of the Republican era on 31 May 1961, had Queen Elizabeth II's royal cypher, the crown above "EIIR", above the coat of arms.

Ribbon

The ribbon is the same as the ribbon for the John Chard Decoration, 32 millimetres wide, with a 3 millimetres wide dark blue band, a 2 millimetres wide white band, a 22 millimetres wide dark red band, a 2 millimetres wide white band and a 3 millimetres wide dark blue band. Distinguishing insignia in silver are worn on the ribbon, but not on the ribbon bar, to denote the Arm of the Service in which the qualifying service was rendered, crossed swords for the South African Army, an eagle for the South African Air Force, an anchor for the South African Navy and a Rod of Asclepius for the South African Medical Service.

== Discontinuation ==
Conferment of the medal was discontinued in respect of services performed on or after 27 April 2003, when the John Chard Medal was replaced by the new Medalje vir Troue Diens.
