= Militia Long Service Medal =

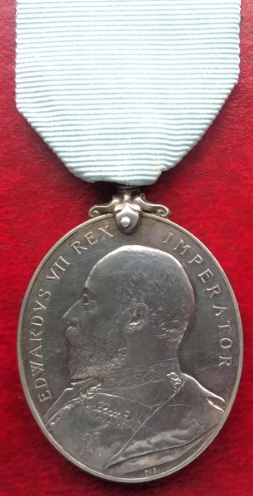
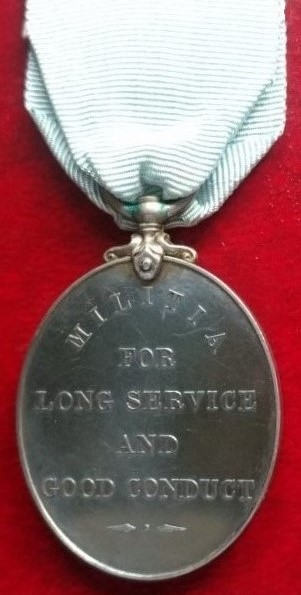
- Original obverse and reverse of the medal
- Type: Long service and good conduct medal
- Awarded for: Awarded for 18 years service and attending 15 annual camps
- Presented by: the United Kingdom
- Eligibility: Efficient and irreproachable service in the Militia.
- Status: Superseded by the Efficiency Medal
- Established: 1904
- Final award: 1930

Highlights
- Total recipients: 1,587
- Ribbon bar

Order of Wear
- Next (higher): Medal for Good Shooting (Naval)
- Next (lower): Imperial Yeomanry Long Service Medal

The Militia Long Service Medal was a long service medal awarded by the United Kingdom between 1904 and 1930.

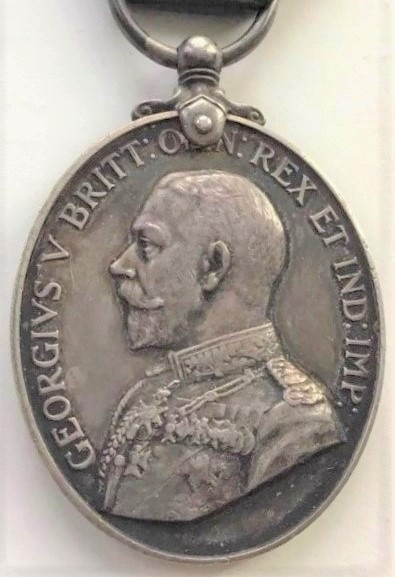
Obverse 1921-1930

== Eligibility ==
Established by King Edward VII by Army Order No. 211 of 1904, the medal was awarded to privates and non-commissioned officers for 18 years efficient and irreproachable service in the Militia and attending 15 annual camps. Any previous full-time service in the Regular Army did not count, although service in other volunteer, territorial or auxiliary forces could be counted, provided that five years immediately preceding the award were served with the Militia. Breaks of service of under one year were allowed. In 1906 eligibility was extended by Royal Warrant to certain militia forces overseas, including Bermuda and Malta.

The medal ceased to be awarded when, as part of the Haldane Reforms, the Militia was abolished and replaced by the Special Reserve on 1 April 1908. The Special Reserve Long Service and Good Conduct Medal was then introduced for service in the new force. The Militia Long Service Medal was again awarded from 1921 when, as part of the reform of part-time forces, the Special Reserve again became the Militia, being restructured in 1924 as a Supplementary Reserve providing specialist technical support to the Regular Army. The Militia Long Service Medal was finally superseded by the Efficiency Medal with bar "Militia" in 1930.

Awards were published in Army Orders, with a total of 1,587 medals awarded: 1,446 bearing the effigy of King Edward VII, (awarded 1904–1908); and 141 with that of George V, (awarded 1921–1930). In terms of unit, the following were conferred: Royal Garrison Artillery: 341; Royal Engineers: 15; Royal Engineer Submarine Miners: 8; Infantry: 988; Channel Islands (Jersey and Guernsey): 89; Malta: 131; Bermuda:15.

== Appearance ==
The Militia Long Service and Good Conduct Medal is an oval shaped silver medal with a fixed ring suspender at the top, of the following design:
The obverse depicts the bust of the King in uniform facing left. Originally Edward VII was shown, with the legend, EDWARDVS VII REX IMPERATOR. In 1911 the image was changed to that of George V, the legend reading GEORGIVS V BRITT: OMN: REX ET IND: IMP:.
The reverse bears the words MILITIA FOR LONG SERVICE AND GOOD CONDUCT.
The medal hangs from a 32 mm light blue ribbon threaded through the top ring suspender.
The recipient's service number, rank, name, and unit were impressed on the edge of the medal.
