= Karyakshama Seva Vibhushanaya =

- Type: Service medal
- Awarded for: 18 years of service with an exceptional record
- Description: Suspended from a plain suspension bar
- Presented by: Sri Lanka
- Eligibility: Commissioned officers of the Sri Lanka Army Volunteer Force
- Post-nominals: KSV
- Clasps: None
- Status: Currently awarded
- Established: 1972
- First award: 1990
- Ribbon bar

Precedence
- Next (higher): Riviresa Campaign Services Medal
- Equivalent: Prashansaniya Seva Vibhushanaya (Sri Lanka Navy)
- Next (lower): Karyakshama Seva Padakkama

The Karyakshama Seva Vibhushanaya (KSV, Efficient Service Order) (Sinhala: කාර්යක්ෂම සේවා විභූෂණය kāryakṣama sēvā vibhūṣaṇaya) is a medal awarded to commissioned officers of the Sri Lanka Army Volunteer Force. Established on 7 January 1986, it replaced the Efficiency Decoration (Ceylon) with effect from 22 May 1972 with volunteer officers who have completed the stipulated required years of service qualifying to the award. Since 2020, with the Karyakshama Seva Padakkama becoming opened to all ranks, the KSV became limited to award for senior volunteer officers.

== Award process ==
It is ordained that the period of service requisite to qualify for the Decoration shall be an aggregate of eighteen years of Efficient Commissioned Service on the Active List of the Sri Lanka Army Volunteer Force, provided that the period of service so rendered has not been previously rewarded by any other Decoration for Efficient Service in the Sri Lanka Army Volunteer Force. The recipient of the decoration will be entitled to use the symbol ‘KSV’ after his/her name

All commissioned officers of the Sri Lanka Army Volunteer Force (including those attached to the National Cadet Corps) who, by or after 22 May 1972, have completed 18 years of excellent service are eligible for the award.

Recipients are entitled to use the post-nominal letters "KSV".

== History ==
Volunteer officers of the Ceylon Defence Force, were awarded the Volunteer Officers' Decoration and thereafter the Efficiency Decoration (Ceylon). This practice continued following the formation the Ceylon Army in 1949 and the creation of the Ceylon Volunteer Force under the Army Act of 1949. The practice ended in 1972, when Ceylon became the Republic of Sri Lanka after the Republic Constitution was enacted on 22 May 1972. The Karyakshama Seva Vibhushanaya was established on 7 January 1986 with retroactive to 22 May 1972. The first recipients of this decoration, set out in The Sri Lanka Gazette of 12 October 1990, were:

Brig. C.N. Panabokke	Brig. A.E.R. Abeysinghe	Brig. P.N.K. Dias
Col. S.B.G. De Silva	Col. N.P.D. Pelpola	Col. R.M. Peris
Col. G.L. Premachandra	Lt. Col. A.P.D. Edirisuriya	Lt. Col. L.D.S. Kariyawasam
Lt. Col. S.V. Panabokke	Lt. Col. A.M.B. Amunugama	Lt. Col. P.V. Pathirana
Lt. Col. S.D. Lankadeva	Lt. Col. A. Weerakoon	Lt. Col. K. Amarasinghe
Lt. Col. S. Weragama	Lt. Col. S.A. Kulathunga	Lt. Col. C.P. Algama
Lt. Col. R.M.D. Ratnayake	Lt. Col. K.R.U. Gunawardana	Lt. Col. L.R. Attanayake
Lt. Col. D.G. Amaratunga	Lt. Col. D.M. Amarakoon	Lt. Col. G.K. Wickramasinghe
Bvt. Lt. Col. D.N. Alawathugoda	Maj. C. Gnaseswaran	Maj. M. Suriyarachchi
Maj. D.S.N. Gancgoda	Capt. T.C.M. Abeysekara	Capt. (QM) R.M.B. Ratnamalala
Lt. W.A.C. Dias	Lt. (QM) H.P. Jayasena	Lt. (QM) R.M.S. Hemapala
