= Efficiency Medal =

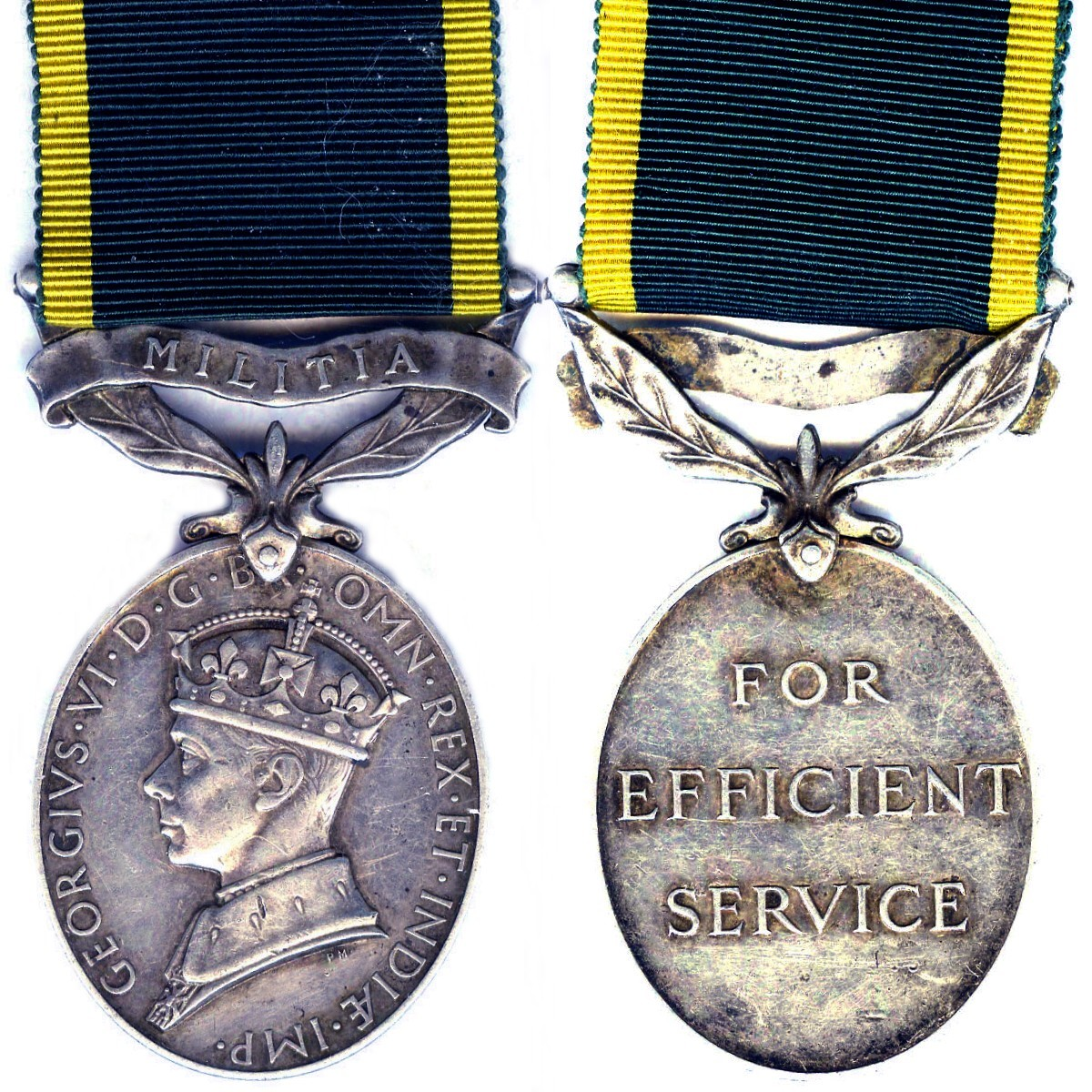
- First King George VI version with a "MILITIA" suspender bar
- Type: Military long service medal
- Awarded for: Twelve years of efficient service
- Country: United Kingdom
- Presented by: the Monarch of the United Kingdom and the British Dominions, and Emperor of India
- Eligibility: Part-time other ranks and some officers
- Clasps: For further periods of 6 years service
- Status: Still current in New Zealand
- Established: 1930
- Original, HAC and 1967 ribbon bars

Order of wear
- Next (higher): Territorial Efficiency Medal
- Equivalent: Efficiency Medal (New Zealand); Efficiency Medal (South Africa)
- Next (lower): Special Reserve Long Service and Good Conduct Medal

The Efficiency Medal was instituted in 1930 for award to part-time warrant officers, non-commissioned officers and men after twelve years of efficient service on the active list of the Militia or the Territorial Army of the United Kingdom, or of the other Auxiliary Military Forces throughout the British Empire. At the same time a clasp was instituted for award to holders of the medal upon completion of further periods of six years of efficient service.

The medal superseded the Volunteer Long Service Medal, the Volunteer Long Service Medal for India and the Colonies, the Colonial Auxiliary Forces Long Service Medal, the Militia Long Service Medal, the Special Reserve Long Service and Good Conduct Medal and the Territorial Efficiency Medal.

In the British Commonwealth, the Efficiency Medal was gradually superseded by national medals in some member countries, in Canada by the Canadian Forces' Decoration in 1951, in the Union of South Africa by the John Chard Medal in 1952 and in Australia by the Reserve Force Medal in 1982. In the United Kingdom the medal was superseded by the Volunteer Reserves Service Medal in 1999. New Zealand continues to award the Efficiency Medal (New Zealand) and is one of a few countries to still do so.

== Origin ==
The Volunteer Long Service Medal was instituted in 1894 as an award for long service by other ranks in the part-time Volunteer Force of the United Kingdom. In 1896 the grant of this medal was extended to members of Volunteer Forces throughout the British Empire and a separate new medal was instituted, the Volunteer Long Service Medal for India and the Colonies. The latter medal was superseded by the Colonial Auxiliary Forces Long Service Medal in 1899, but continued to be awarded by the Isle of Man, Bermuda and the Indian Empire.

The Militia Long Service Medal and the Special Reserve Long Service and Good Conduct Medal were instituted in the United Kingdom in 1904 and 1908 respectively. Also in 1908, when the Territorial Force was formed, the Volunteer Long Service Medal was superseded by the Territorial Force Efficiency Medal, which itself was superseded by the Territorial Efficiency Medal in 1921 when the Territorial Force became the Territorial Army.

== Institution ==
The Efficiency Medal was instituted by Royal Warrant on 23 September 1930, as a long service award for part-time warrant officers, non-commissioned officers and men of the Militia or the Territorial Army of the United Kingdom, and of the Auxiliary Military Forces of the British Dominions, Colonies and Protectorates and India. At the same time a clasp was instituted, for award to recipients of the medal upon completion of further periods of efficient service.

The medal consolidated the various existing long service medals for part-time service into one medal to reward the long service and good conduct of warrant officers, non-commissioned officers and men throughout the British Empire. It superseded the Volunteer Long Service Medal, the Volunteer Long Service Medal for India and the Colonies, the Colonial Auxiliary Forces Long Service Medal, the Militia Long Service Medal, the Special Reserve Long Service and Good Conduct Medal and the Territorial Efficiency Medal.

The medal bears a subsidiary title to denote whether the recipient qualified for its award while serving in the Militia or the Territorial Army or in one of the other Auxiliary Military Forces of the Empire. The subsidiary title was inscribed on a scroll bar attached to the medal suspender, "MILITIA", "TERRITORIAL" or "T.& A.V.R." in respect of the United Kingdom's Militia, Territorial Army and Territorial and Army Volunteer Reserve respectively, or the name of the applicable country in respect of other Auxiliary Military Forces.

The equivalent award for commissioned officers was the Efficiency Decoration.

== Award criteria ==
The medal could be awarded to part-time warrant officers, non-commissioned officers and men after twelve years of continuous efficient service on the active list of the Militia, the Territorial Army or of any other Auxiliary Military Force of the British Empire. War service was reckoned two-fold, as did service in West Africa, although service by natives of West Africa and periods spent on leave counted only singly. Service during the period from 3 September 1939 to 1 March 1950 inclusive need not have been continuous, while breaks in service under certain specified conditions, though not counting as qualifying service, were not considered as a break in the twelve years of continuous service qualifying for the medal.

Clasps could initially be awarded to holders of the medal upon completion of eighteen and twenty-four years of efficient service. This was amended on 26 August 1944 to authorise the award of additional clasps for each additional completed period of six years of efficient service after twenty-four years. Post war, the maximum number of clasps awarded to one recipient is six.

A further amendment on 10 May 1946 made part-time officers who served during the Second World War also eligible for the award of the medal and clasp, provided they were serving on the active list of the Territorial Army, the Auxiliary Territorial Service or any Auxiliary Military Force on 2 September 1939 and were embodied or called up for war service. The reason for this amendment originated from the anomaly that, during the war, a large number of officers were commissioned from the ranks, and merely by the fact that they were so promoted owing to their efficiency, would be denied the right to the Efficiency Medal. Such officers were allowed to reckon their service as officers as qualifying service for the medal and clasps. Officers who had already qualified for the award of the Efficiency Decoration before that date were, however, not eligible.

== Order of wear ==
In the order of wear prescribed by the British Central Chancery of the Orders of Knighthood, the Efficiency Medal takes precedence after the Territorial Efficiency Medal and before the Special Reserve Long Service and Good Conduct Medal.

== Description ==
The medal was struck in silver and is oval, 39 millimetres (1.54 inches) high and 32 millimetres (1.26 inches) wide. The fixed suspender bar, a pair of laurel leaves, is affixed to the medal by means of a single-toe claw and a horizontal pin through the upper edge of the medal. The suspender is decorated on the obverse with a scroll-pattern bar, inscribed to indicate the military force in which the recipient was serving at the time of qualification for the award.

=== Obverse ===
Six versions of the medal have been awarded, the sixth only in Canada. The obverse has a raised rim on all versions and bears the crowned effigy of the reigning monarch.

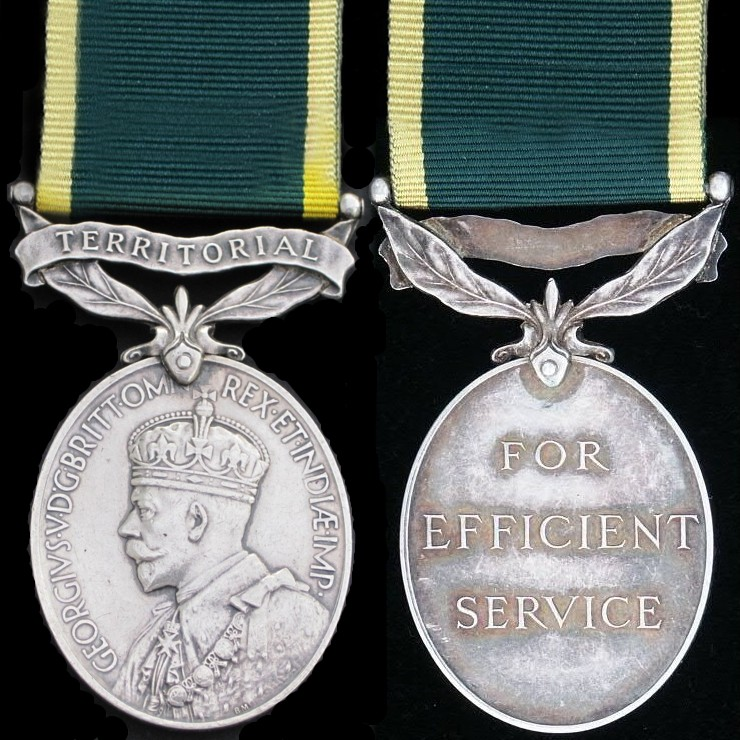
King George V version with a "TERRITORIAL" suspender bar

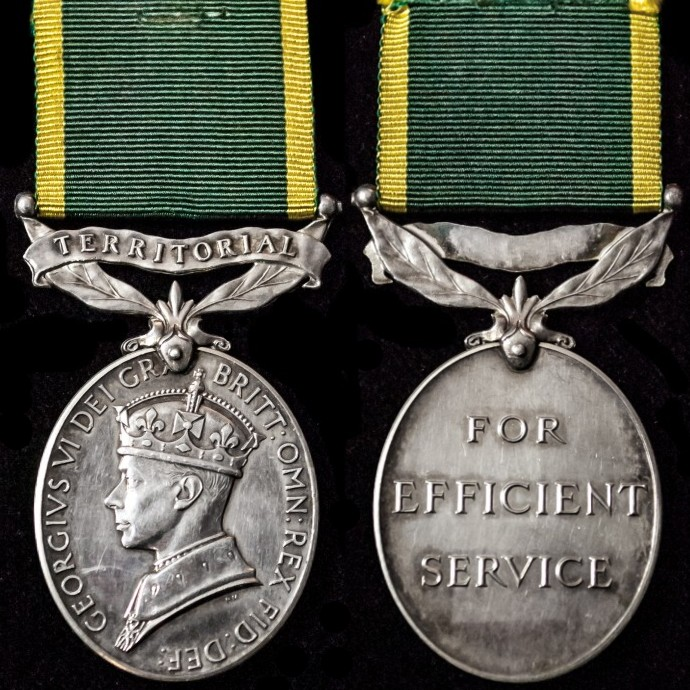
Second King George VI version with a "TERRITORIAL" suspender bar

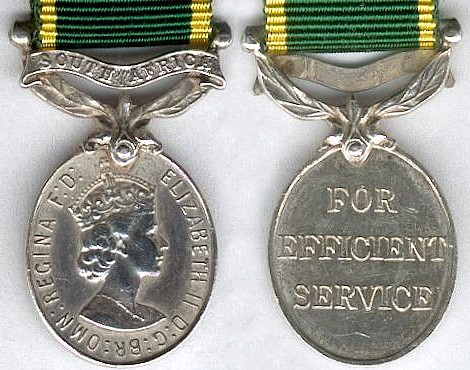
First Queen Elizabeth II version with a "SOUTH AFRICA" suspender bar

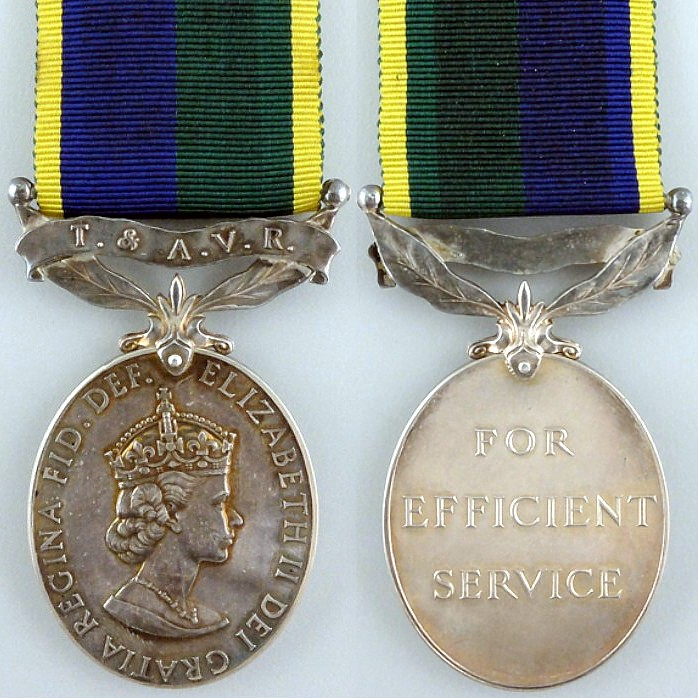
Second Queen Elizabeth II version with a "T.& A.V.R." suspender bar

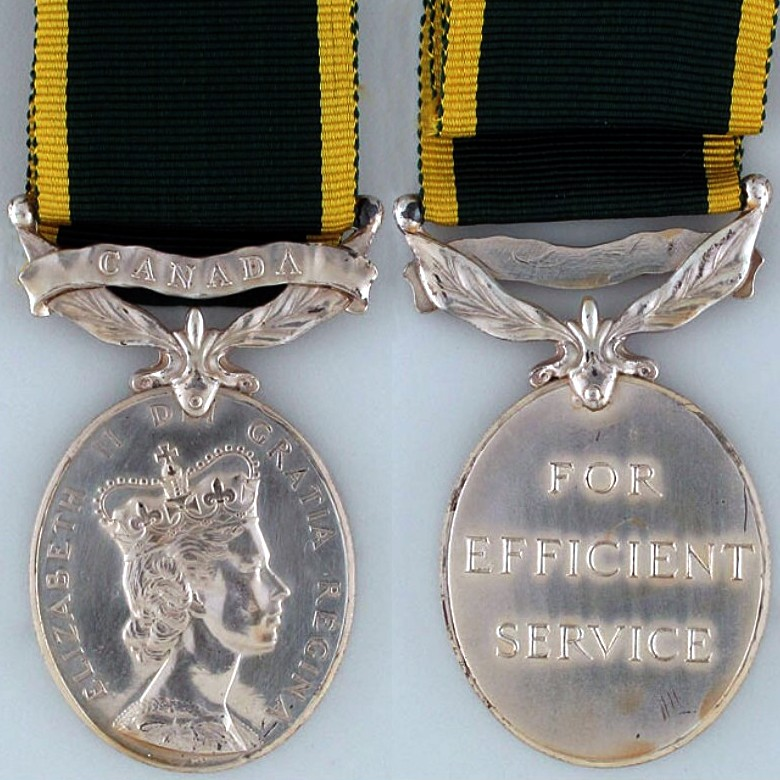
Third Queen Elizabeth II version with a "CANADA" suspender bar

- The original version has the effigy of King George V in coronation robes and wearing the Tudor Crown. It is circumscribed "GEORGIVS•V•D•G•BRITT•OMN REX•ET•INDIÆ•IMP•". The initials "BM" at the bottom of the effigy are those of the designer of the obverse, Sir Bertram Mackennal KCVO, an Australian sculptor.
- The first King George VI version was introduced after his succession to the throne in 1936 and has his effigy in coronation robes and wearing the Tudor Crown, facing left and circumscribed "GEORGIVS•VI•D•G•BR•OMN•REX•ET•INDIÆ•IMP•". The initials "PM" below the effigy are those of the designer of the obverse, sculptor Percy Metcalfe CVO RDI.
- The second King George VI version was introduced after 1947, when his title "Emperor of India" was abandoned and reference to India was omitted from the medal inscription. The effigy on the obverse remained the same, but the circumscription was changed to "GEORGIVS VI DEI GRA BRITT: OMN: REX FID: DEF:".
- The first Queen Elizabeth II version was introduced after her succession to the throne in 1952 and has her effigy, facing right and wearing the Tudor Crown. It is circumscribed "ELIZABETH II D: G: BR: OMN: REGINA F: D:" reading around from the top.
- The second Queen Elizabeth II version was introduced after her coronation in 1953 and has the same effigy, but is circumscribed "ELIZABETH II DEI GRATIA REGINA FID. DEF." reading around from the top.
- The third Queen Elizabeth II version, created by Canada utilising a unique Royal Canadian Mint effigy of the Queen and awarded only to Canadians, has her crowned effigy, facing right and wearing the Saint Edward's Crown. It is circumscribed "ELIZABETH II DEI GRATIA REGINA".

=== Scroll bar ===
Three suspender scroll bar inscriptions were used on medals awarded to members of part-time forces in the United Kingdom.

- Militia. Medals awarded to members serving in those categories of the Supplementary Reserve whose roots lay in the Militia bore a scroll bar inscribed "MILITIA". Medals with this scroll bar version were awarded from 1930 until the formation of the Army Emergency Reserve in 1951. This scroll bar version appeared on the King George V and both King George VI versions of the medal.
- Territorial. Medals awarded to members serving in the Territorial Army bore a scroll bar inscribed "TERRITORIAL". Medals with this scroll bar version were awarded from 1930 to 1967, when the Territorial and Army Volunteer Reserve was formed and a new scroll bar version was introduced. The "TERRITORIAL" scroll bar version was reinstated in 1982 and remained in use until the medal was superseded in the United Kingdom in 1999. This scroll bar version appeared on the King George V, both King George VI and first two Queen Elizabeth II versions of the medal.
- T. & A.V.R. Medals awarded to members serving in the Territorial and Army Volunteer Reserve, established in 1967, bore a scroll bar inscribed "T. & A.V.R.". Along with this scroll bar version, a new medal ribbon was introduced, half blue and half green, edged in yellow. This scroll bar version appeared only on the second Queen Elizabeth II version of the medal and remained in use until 1982, when the use of the "TERRITORIAL" scroll bar version was resumed.

Medals awarded to members of the Auxiliary Military Forces of the British Dominions, Colonies and Protectorates and India bore scroll bars inscribed with the names of the respective countries. All six obverse versions of the medal were used for the Auxiliary Military Forces, but no country awarded all six versions.

- Antigua. Only the first Queen Elizabeth II version was awarded.
- Australia. The first five versions were awarded.
- Barbados. The first five versions were awarded.
- Bermuda. The first five versions were awarded.
- British Guiana. The first four versions were awarded.
- British Honduras. The first four versions were awarded.
- Burma. Only the first King George VI version was awarded.
- Canada. All three King's versions and the second and third Queen Elizabeth II versions were awarded.
- Ceylon. The first four versions were awarded.
- Dominica. Only the first King George VI version was awarded.
- Falkland Islands. The King George V, first King George VI and first two Queen Elizabeth II versions were awarded.
- Fiji. The second King George VI and the first two Queen Elizabeth II versions were awarded.
- Gibraltar. The second King George VI and the first two Queen Elizabeth II versions were awarded.
- Gold Coast. Only the two King George VI versions were awarded.
- Grenada. Only the first King George VI version was awarded.
- Guernsey. Both King George VI and the first two Queen Elizabeth II versions were awarded.
- Hong Kong. The first five versions were awarded.
- India. The first two versions were awarded.
- Jamaica. The first four versions were awarded.
- Jersey. Both King George VI and the second Queen Elizabeth II versions were awarded.
- Kenya. Both King George VI and the first Queen Elizabeth II versions were awarded.
- Leeward Islands. Both King George VI and the first Queen Elizabeth II versions were awarded.
- Malaya. Both King George VI and the first Queen Elizabeth II versions were awarded.
- Malta. Both King George VI and the first two Queen Elizabeth II versions were awarded.
- Mauritius. Only the first Queen Elizabeth II version was awarded.
- Montserrat. Only the second Queen Elizabeth II version was awarded.
- New Zealand. The first five versions were awarded.
- Nigeria. The King George V, second King George VI and first Queen Elizabeth II versions were awarded.
- Rhodesia and Nyasaland. Only the first Queen Elizabeth II version was awarded.
- Saint Kitts and Nevis. Only the first Queen Elizabeth II version was awarded.
- Saint Lucia. Only the first King George VI version was awarded.
- Saint Vincent. Only the first King George VI version was awarded.
- South Africa. The first two versions were awarded.
- Southern Rhodesia. The first four versions were awarded.
- Trinidad and Tobago. The two King George VI and first Queen Elizabeth II versions were awarded.

=== South Africa ===
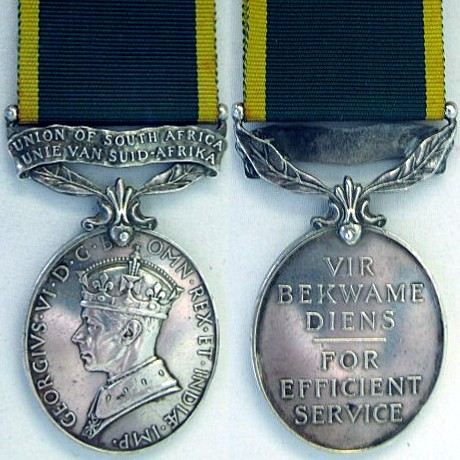
First King George VI version with a bilingual reverse and "UNION OF SOUTH AFRICA" "UNIE VAN SUID-AFRIKA" suspender bar

The South African version of the medal was unique since the inscriptions on the scroll bar and the reverse of the medal were bilingual, in English and Afrikaans on the scroll bar and in Afrikaans and English on the medal's reverse.

The English-only Queen Elizabeth II version of the Efficiency Medal (South Africa), of which a miniature is depicted above to illustrate the first Queen Elizabeth II version of the obverse, was never awarded since the medal was superseded within a few months of the Queen's succession to the throne.

=== Reverse ===
The reverse is smooth with a raised rim and bears the inscription "FOR EFFICIENT SERVICE" in three lines. On the South African version, the Afrikaans and English inscriptions are "VIR BEKWAME DIENS" and "FOR EFFICIENT SERVICE", each language in three lines and the languages separated by a 13 millimetres long line. The name of the recipient was impressed on the rim of the medal.

=== Clasps ===
Clasp versions: Top: Elizabeth II Below: George V & VI

Two versions of the clasp were created. The King George V version, illustrated at the bottom alongside, is decorated with an embossed Tudor Crown and remained unaltered during the reign of King George VI. The Queen Elizabeth II version, illustrated at the top alongside, is decorated with an embossed Saint Edward's Crown. The clasps were struck in silver and were designed to be sewn onto the medal ribbon.

=== Ribbons ===
Three ribbons are used with the medal, all 32 millimetres wide. In the United Kingdom, an alternative ribbon is used when the medal is awarded to members of the Honourable Artillery Company, while a new regular ribbon was introduced in 1967.

- The medal's original ribbon, which is still being used for awards outside the United Kingdom, is dark green, edged with 3 millimetres wide lime yellow bands. It is identical to the ribbon of the superseded Territorial Efficiency Medal.
- Medals awarded to members of the Honourable Artillery Company (HAC) are suspended from a half dark blue and half red ribbon with 2½ millimetre wide yellow edges, representing the racing colours of King Edward VII. An administrative oversight resulted in members of the HAC, reckoned as the oldest regiment of the British Army, not being made eligible for the Volunteer Long Service Medal until 1906. To compensate the HAC for this omission, that medal was awarded to its members with a special ribbon to distinguish it from regular awards, a distinction continued with subsequent Territorial and reserve long service awards, including the current Volunteer Reserves Service Medal.
- Following the formation of the Territorial and Army Volunteer Reserve in 1967, the subsidiary title on the scroll bar was changed from "TERRITORIAL" to "T. & A.V.R." and the dark green and lime yellow ribbon was replaced by a half blue, half green ribbon, edged with 2½ millimetres wide lime yellow bands. In 1982 the title "Territorial and Army Volunteer Reserve" reverted to the earlier "Territorial Army" and the subsidiary title on the medal reverted to "TERRITORIAL", but this new ribbon remained in use.

== Army Emergency Reserve Efficiency Medal ==
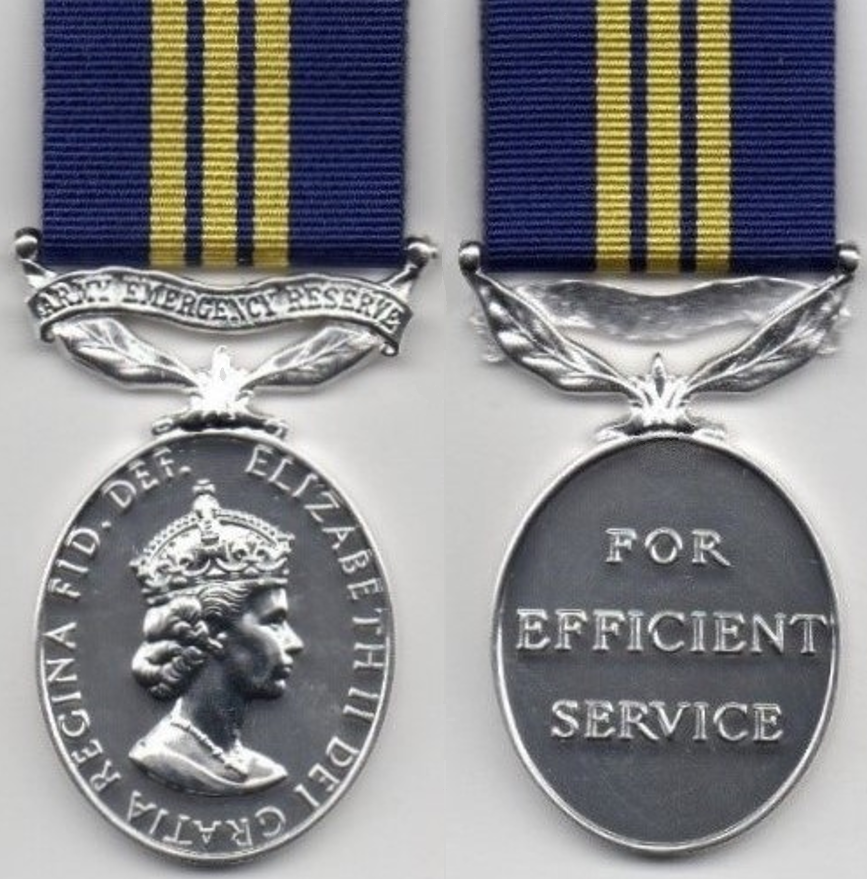
Version with "ARMY EMERGENCY RESERVE" suspender bar

A separate Army Emergency Reserve Efficiency Medal was instituted in September 1953 to reward long service in the Army Supplementary Reserve from 1924, and the Army Emergency Reserve from 1948. Awards were made on the same basis as the Efficiency Medal, with the same design of medal, save for the scroll bar which bore the inscription "Army Emergency Reserve" and the ribbon, which was dark blue ribbon with three yellow stripes towards the centre. The medal ceased to be awarded after 1967 on the creation of the Territorial and Army Volunteer Reserve, when it was replaced by the Efficiency Medal with scroll bar inscribed T. & A.V.R.

Officers in the Emergency Reserve were eligible for the Emergency Reserve Decoration.

== Discontinuation ==
New Zealand continues to award the Efficiency Medal (New Zealand) and is one of a few countries to still do so. In the United Kingdom and some countries of the Commonwealth the medal was gradually superseded by new national medals.

- Canada was the first to institute another medal to supersede the Efficiency Medal (Canada) on 7 June 1951, when the Canadian Forces Decoration was first awarded. Members who had joined the Canadian Forces before 1 September 1939, however, remained eligible for the award of the Efficiency Medal (Canada).
- In Ceylon, the Efficiency Medal (Ceylon) was suspended on 7 March 1972 and was later replaced by the Karyakshama Seva Vibhushanaya (Efficient Service Order) on 7 January 1986.
- In South Africa, the Efficiency Medal (South Africa) was superseded on 6 April 1952 by the John Chard Medal, which could be awarded to all ranks after twelve years of continuous efficient service in the Citizen Force.
- In Australia, the Efficiency Medal (Australia) was superseded on 20 April 1982 by the Reserve Force Medal, which could be awarded to other ranks of the Australian Defence Force Reserves after fifteen years of service.
- In the United Kingdom, the Efficiency Medal was superseded on 1 April 1999 by the Volunteer Reserves Service Medal, which can be awarded to all ranks after ten years of service in the Reserves.
