= Efficiency Decoration =

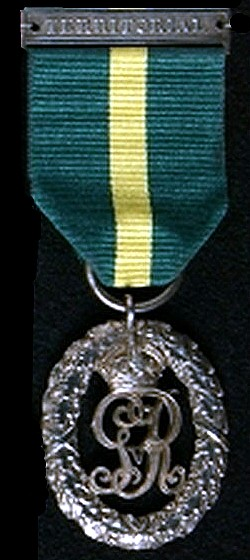
- King George V version with a "TERRITORIAL" bar-brooch
- Type: Military long service decoration
- Awarded for: Twenty years service until 1949; Twelve years service from 1949
- Country: United Kingdom
- Presented by: the Monarch of the United Kingdom and the British Dominions, and Emperor of India
- Eligibility: Part-time commissioned officers of the Territorial Army and Auxiliary Military Forces
- Post-nominals: TD (Territorial Army); ED (Auxiliary Military Forces)
- Status: Still current in New Zealand
- Established: 1930
- Original, HAC and 1967 ribbon bars

Order of wear
- Next (higher): Ceylon Armed Services Long Service Medal
- Equivalent: Efficiency Decoration (Canada); Efficiency Decoration (New Zealand); Efficiency Decoration (South Africa); Emergency Reserve Decoration
- Next (lower): Territorial Efficiency Medal

The Efficiency Decoration, post-nominal letters TD for recipients serving in the Territorial Army of the United Kingdom or ED for those serving in the Auxiliary Military Forces, was instituted in 1930 for award to part-time officers after twenty years of service as an efficient and thoroughly capable officer. The decoration superseded the Volunteer Officers' Decoration, the Colonial Auxiliary Forces Officers' Decoration and the Territorial Decoration.

In the British Commonwealth, the decoration was gradually superseded by national decorations in some member countries, in Canada by the Canadian Forces' Decoration in 1951, in the Union of South Africa by the John Chard Decoration in 1952 and in Australia by the Reserve Force Decoration in 1982. In the United Kingdom, the decoration was superseded by the Volunteer Reserves Service Medal in 1999. New Zealand continues to award the Efficiency Decoration (New Zealand) and is one of a few countries still to do so.

== Origin ==
In 1892 the Volunteer Officers' Decoration was instituted as an award for long and meritorious service by officers of the United Kingdom's Volunteer Force. In 1894, the grant of the decoration was extended to officers of volunteer forces throughout the British Empire by instituting a separate new decoration, the Volunteer Officers' Decoration for India and the Colonies.

The Volunteer Officers' Decoration for India and the Colonies was superseded in 1899 by the Colonial Auxiliary Forces Officers' Decoration. In the United Kingdom, the Volunteer Officers' Decoration was superseded by the Territorial Decoration in 1908, but it continued to be awarded in a few Crown Dependencies until 1930.

== Institution ==
The Efficiency Decoration was instituted by Royal Warrant on 23 September 1930 as a long service award for part-time officers of the Territorial Army of the United Kingdom and of the Auxiliary Military Forces of the British Dominions, Colonies and Protectorates and India. It superseded the Volunteer Officers' Decoration, the Colonial Auxiliary Forces Officers' Decoration and the Territorial Decoration.

The decoration bore a subsidiary title to denote whether the recipient qualified for its award while serving in the Territorial Army or in one of the other Auxiliary Military Forces of the Empire. The subsidiary title was inscribed on the bar-brooch of the decoration, "TERRITORIAL" in respect of the Territorial Army or the name of the applicable country in respect of other Auxiliary Military Forces.

When the medal was awarded to Territorial Army officers, it is officially known as the Efficiency Decoration (Territorial). However, it is also unofficially known as the Territorial Decoration, the name of its predecessor.

The Royal Warrant of 23 September 1930 was amended by Royal Warrants dated 1 February 1940, 4 April 1946, 8 April 1949, 8 August 1949 and 6 August 1951. On 17 November 1952, these earlier warrants were annulled and, along with some new amendments, incorporated in one new Royal Warrant.

== Award criteria ==
The decoration could be awarded to part-time officers after twenty years of commissioned service, not necessarily continuous, as an efficient and thoroughly capable officer on the active list of the Territorial Army or of any other Auxiliary Military Force of the British Empire. Half of the time served in the ranks could be reckoned as qualifying service for the decoration. Service in West Africa, natives of West Africa and periods spent on leave excluded, and war service was reckoned two-fold as qualifying service for the decoration. The award could also be made to any Princes or Princesses of the Blood Royal.

The equivalent award for other ranks was the Efficiency Medal.

Recipients serving in the Territorial Army of the United Kingdom are entitled to use the post-nominal letters TD, while recipients serving in the Auxiliary Military Forces are entitled to use the post-nominal letters ED. A recipient who had earlier been awarded any Long Service and Good Conduct Medal or the Efficiency Medal or a clasp to either for service in the ranks, was not permitted to wear the medal or clasp together with the decoration until the full service periods prescribed for each medal or clasp and the decoration had been completed.

From 1949, the required period of qualifying service was reduced to a minimum twelve years of commissioned service in the Territorial Force and the Auxiliary forces of the Commonwealth. In respect of officers whose service terminated before 3 September 1939, the qualifying period of commissioned service remained twenty years.

At the same time, a clasp was instituted which could be awarded upon the completion of each further period of six years of qualifying service. The maximum number of clasps awarded to one recipient is five.

== Order of wear ==
In the order of wear prescribed by the British Central Chancery of the Orders of Knighthood, the Efficiency Decoration takes precedence after the Ceylon Armed Services Long Service Medal and before the Territorial Efficiency Medal.

== Description ==
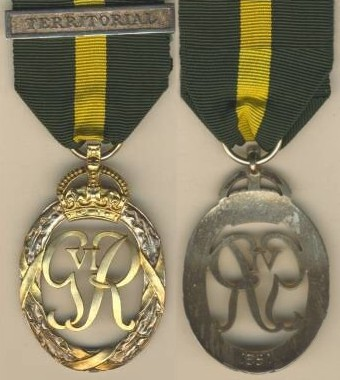
Second King George VI version with a "TERRITORIAL" bar-brooch

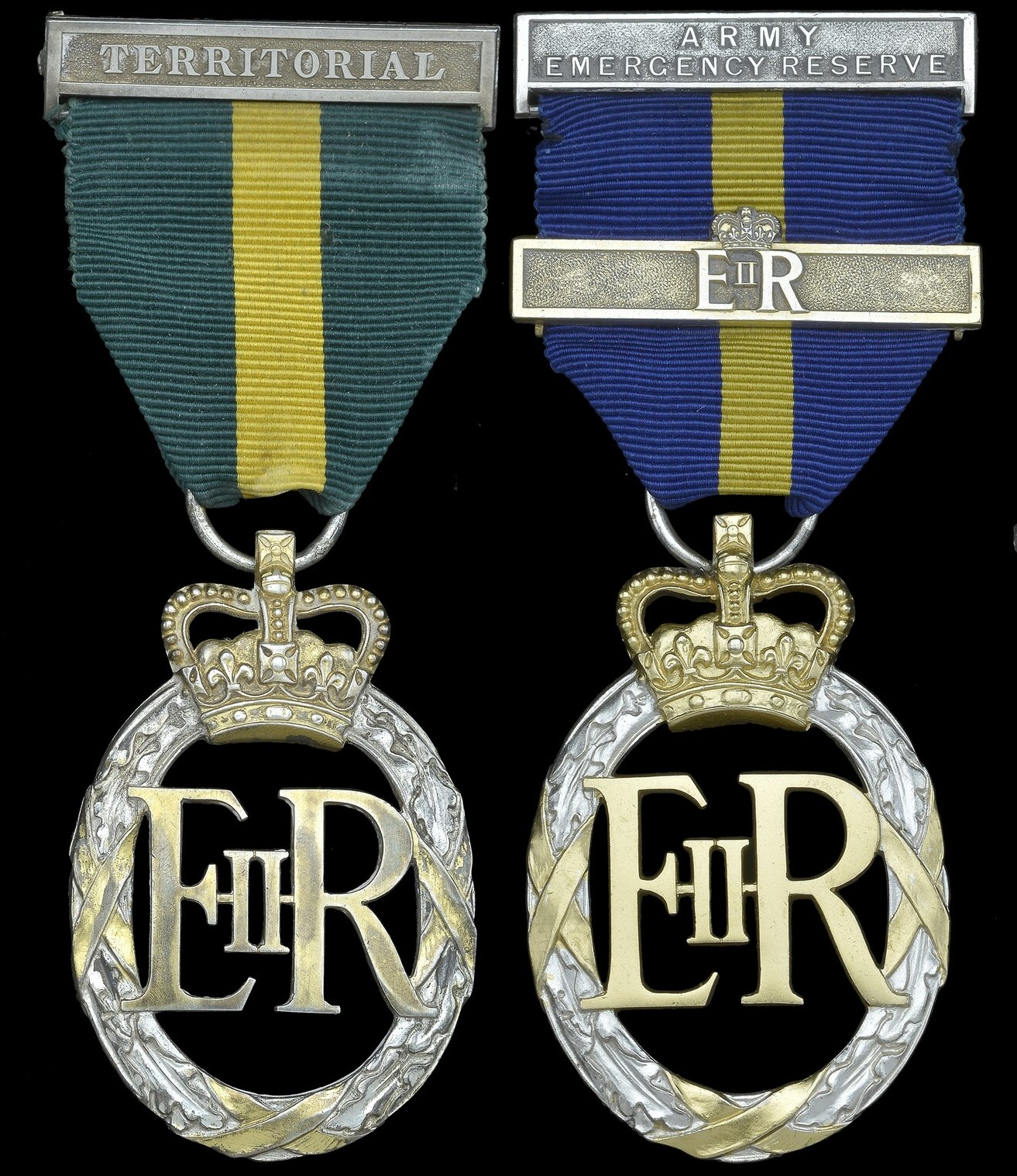
Queen Elizabeth II version with a "TERRITORIAL" bar-brooch, alongside the Emergency Reserve Decoration

The decoration is an oval skeletal design and was struck in silver, with parts of the obverse in silver-gilt. The original badge is the same as that of the King George V version of the Territorial Decoration, 43 millimetres (1.69 inches) high and 35.5 millimetres (1.40 inches) wide, but with the decoration's subsidiary title inscribed on the bar-brooch.

The subsequent King George V, King George VI and Queen Elizabeth II versions are of a new design, 54 millimetres (2.13 inches) high and 37 millimetres (1.46 inches) wide, with a 15 millimetres (0.59 inches) diameter ring suspender, formed of silver wire, which passes through a small ring affixed to the top back of the crown.

=== Obverse ===
The obverse is an oval oak leaf wreath in silver, tied with gold, with the Royal Cypher of the reigning monarch in the centre below the Royal Crown, both in gold. Four versions of the decoration have been awarded.

- On the decoration's original King George V version of 1930, the Royal Cypher "GvR", for "Georgivs V Rex", and the crown are both encircled by the wreath.
- The first King George VI version has his Royal Cypher "GRI" for "Georgivs Rex Imperator". On this and the subsequent versions, the crown is located higher and covers the top part of the wreath.
- The second King George VI version, introduced after India became independent in 1947, has his Royal Cypher "GviR" for "Georgivs VI Rex".
- The Queen Elizabeth II version, with her Royal Cypher "EIIR" for "Elizabeth II Regina", was introduced after her succession to the throne in 1952. This version of the badge of the decoration is identical to that of the Emergency Reserve Decoration, instituted in 1952.

=== Subsidiary title ===
The medal ribbon is suspended from a rectangular silver bar-brooch, inscribed "TERRITORIAL" in respect of the Territorial Army or with the name of the applicable country in respect of other Auxiliary Military Forces. In South Africa a bilingual subsidiary title was used, with the bar-brooch inscribed "UNION OF SOUTH AFRICA" and "UNIE VAN SUID-AFRIKA" in two lines. On the reverse the bar-brooch is impressed with silver hallmarks.

=== Reverse ===
The reverse is smooth and undecorated, with the year the decoration was awarded impressed at the bottom on decorations awarded in the United Kingdom, or with the rank, initials and surname of the recipient impressed around the perimeter in some countries.

=== Clasps ===
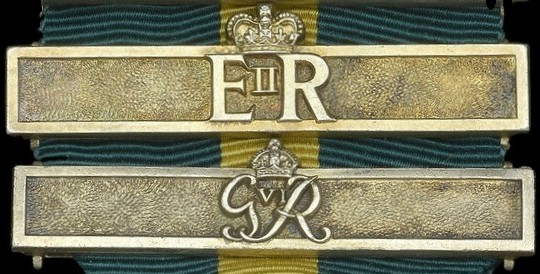

The clasps have either the Royal Cypher of King George VI (GVIR) or Queen Elizabeth II (EIIR) in the centre, surmounted by the Royal Crown, with the year of the award impressed on the reverse. In undress uniform or when ribbon bars alone are worn, a recipient of one or more clasps would wear a silver rosette on the ribbon bar to denote each clasp.

=== Ribbons ===
Three ribbons are used with the decoration, all 38 millimetres (1.50 inches) wide. In the United Kingdom, an alternative ribbon is used when the decoration is awarded to officers of the Honourable Artillery Company, while a new regular ribbon was introduced in 1967.

- The decoration's original ribbon, which is still being used for awards outside the United Kingdom, is dark green with a 7 millimetres wide lime yellow band in the centre. It is identical to the ribbon of the superseded Territorial Decoration.
- Decorations awarded to members of the Honourable Artillery Company (HAC) are suspended from a half dark blue and half red ribbon with yellow edges, representing the racing colours of King Edward VII. An administrative oversight resulted in members of the HAC, the oldest regiment of the British Army, not being made eligible for the Volunteer Long Service Medal until 1906. To compensate the HAC for this omission, that medal was awarded to its members with this special ribbon to distinguish it from regular awards, a distinction continued with subsequent Territorial and reserve long service awards, including the current Volunteer Reserves Service Medal.
- Following the formation of the Territorial and Army Volunteer Reserve in 1967, the subsidiary title on the bar-brooch was changed from "TERRITORIAL" to "T. & A.V.R." and the dark green and lime yellow ribbon was replaced by a half blue, half green ribbon with a 7 millimetres wide lime yellow band in the centre. In 1982 the title "Territorial and Army Volunteer Reserve" reverted to the earlier "Territorial Army" and the subsidiary title on the decoration reverted to "TERRITORIAL", but this new ribbon remained in use.

== Discontinuation ==
New Zealand continues to award the Efficiency Decoration (New Zealand) and is one of a few countries to still do so. In the United Kingdom and some countries of the Commonwealth, the decoration was gradually superseded by new decorations.

- Canada was the first to institute another decoration to supersede the Efficiency Decoration (Canada) from 1951, after the Canadian Forces' Decoration was instituted on 15 December 1949.
- In South Africa, the Efficiency Decoration (South Africa) was superseded on 6 April 1952 by the John Chard Decoration, which could be awarded to all ranks of the Citizen Force for twenty years of efficient service and good conduct.
- In Ceylon, the Efficiency Decoration (Ceylon) was superseded by the Karyakshama Seva Vibhushanaya (Efficient Service Order) on 22 May 1972.
- In Australia, the Efficiency Decoration (Australia) was superseded by the Reserve Force Decoration on 20 April 1982.
- In the United Kingdom, the Efficiency Decoration was superseded by the Volunteer Reserves Service Medal on 1 April 1999.
