= Territorial Force Efficiency Medal =

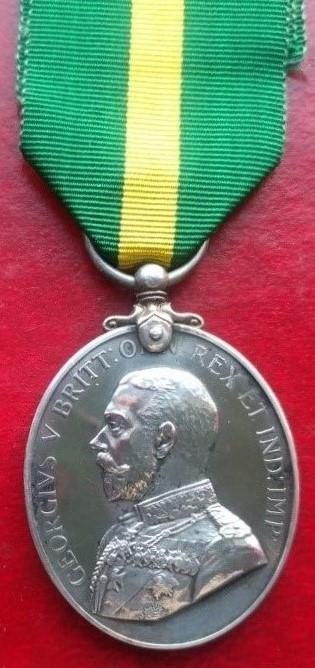
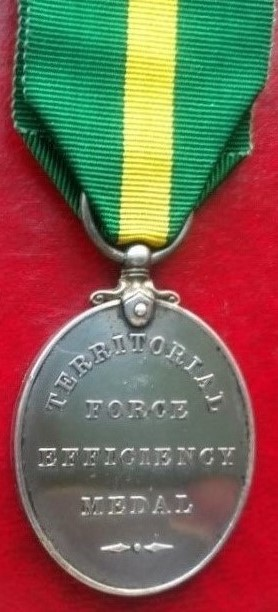
- Obverse (George V) and reverse of the medal
- Type: Long service medal
- Awarded for: A minimum of 12 years service, with war service counting double
- Description: Oval silver medal
- Presented by: The United Kingdom
- Eligibility: Territorial Force – other ranks
- Clasps: Bars awarded for further periods of 12 years service
- Status: This award: Superseded the Volunteer Long Service Medal in 1908; Superseded by the Territorial Efficiency Medal in 1921
- Established: 1908

Highlights
- Total recipients: 49,526 (899 with bar, 64 with second bar)
- Regular and HAC ribbon bars

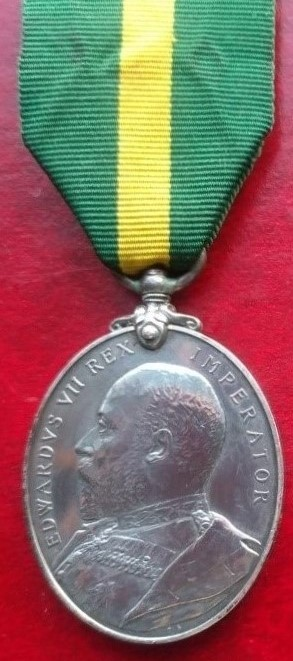
Obverse, Edward VII, 1908–11

The Territorial Force Efficiency Medal was a United Kingdom award for long service in the Territorial Force between 1908 and 1921.

== Institution ==
Established in 1908, the medal superseded the Volunteer Long Service Medal and the Imperial Yeomanry Long Service Medal when the Territorial Force was formed on 1 April 1908. This followed the enactment of the Territorial and Reserve Forces Act 1907, (7 Edw.7, c.9) which instigated a major re-organisation of the old Volunteer Force and the remaining units of Militia and Yeomanry. The Militia were transferred to the Special Reserve rather than the Territorial Force, and were therefore eligible for the Special Reserve Long Service and Good Conduct Medal.

The medal was superseded by the Territorial Efficiency Medal when the Territorial Force was elevated to become the Territorial Army in 1921.

== Award criteria ==
The Territorial Force Efficiency Medal was awarded to non-commissioned officers and men for a minimum of 12 years service in the Territorial Force, providing they attended 12 annual training camps. Previous service in other part-time forces including the Volunteer Force could count, while war service counted double. Bars were awarded for further periods of 12 years.

The equivalent award for commissioned officers was the Territorial Decoration. A recipient could wear both awards together, provided they completed the full periods of qualifying service for each.

== Description ==
The Territorial Force Efficiency Medal is an oval silver medal, 38 millimetres (1.5 inches) high and 31 millimetres (1.2 inches) wide.
The obverse depicts the bust of the reigning King in Field Marshal's uniform, facing left. Originally Edward VII was shown, with the legend, EDWARDVS VII REX IMPERATOR. In 1911 the image was changed to that of George V, the legend reading GEORGIVS V BRITT: OMN: REX ET IND: IMP:.
The reverse has a raised rim and bears the inscription "TERRITORIAL FORCE EFFICIENCY MEDAL" on four lines.
The recipient's service number, rank, name, and unit were impressed on the edge of the medal.

The medal hangs from a ring suspension, attached to the medal by a claw fixing. The 32 millimetres (1.26 inches) wide ribbon was originally plain dark green with a central yellow stripe, but in December 1919 was changed to plain dark green with yellow edges.

=== Honourable Artillery Company ===
For members of the Honourable Artillery Company (HAC) the ribbon differed, being half blue, half scarlet with yellow edges, reflecting the racing colours of King Edward VII. This distinction was bestowed by Edward VII for the Volunteer Long Service And Good Conduct Medal and was extended to long service medals under the Territorial designations.

== Bibliography ==
- Beckett, Ian Frederick William (2011). Britain's Part-Time Soldiers: The Amateur Military Tradition: 1558–1945. Barnsley, South Yorkshire: Pen & Sword Military. ISBN 978-1-84-884395-0.
- Collett, D. W. (10 April 1981). Brant, J. G. (ed.). Medals Yearbook. London, UK: Medals Year Book. ISBN 978-0-95-069431-3.
- Dorling, H. Taprell (1956). Ribbons and Medals. London: A.H.Baldwin & Sons. OCLC 930416375.
- Mussell, John, ed. (20 September 2014). Medal Yearbook 2015. Honiton, Devon: Token Publishing Ltd. p. 177. ISBN 978-1-908828-17-0.
