= Special Reserve Long Service and Good Conduct Medal =

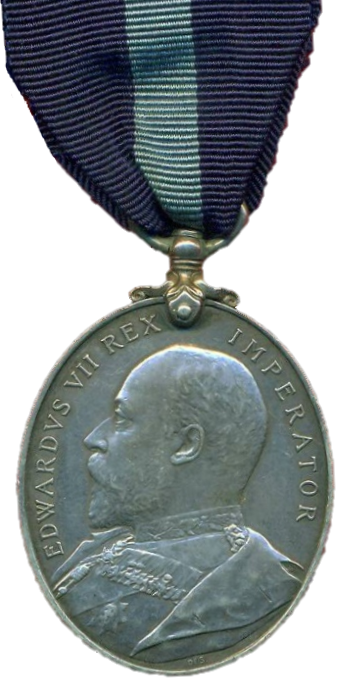
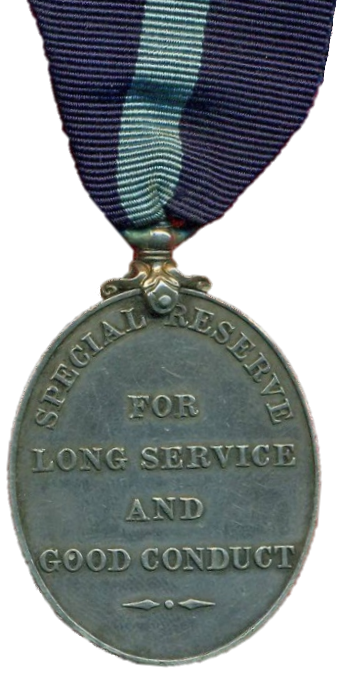
- Obverse and reverse of the medal
- Type: Long service and good conduct medal
- Awarded for: Awarded for 15 years service and attending 15 annual camps.
- Presented by: the United Kingdom
- Eligibility: Efficient and irreproachable service in the Special Reserve
- Status: Superseded by the Efficiency Medal
- Established: 1908
- Final award: 1930

Highlights
- Total: 1,078
- Ribbon bar

Order of Wear
- Next (higher): Efficiency Medal
- Next (lower): Decoration for Officers of the Royal Naval Volunteer Reserve
- Related: Militia Long Service Medal

The Special Reserve Long Service and Good Conduct Medal was a long service medal awarded by the United Kingdom. The medal was awarded for service in the Army Special Reserve, or a combination of service in the Special Reserve and other part-time military forces. Awarded between 1908 and 1930, the medal was only awarded 1,078 times.

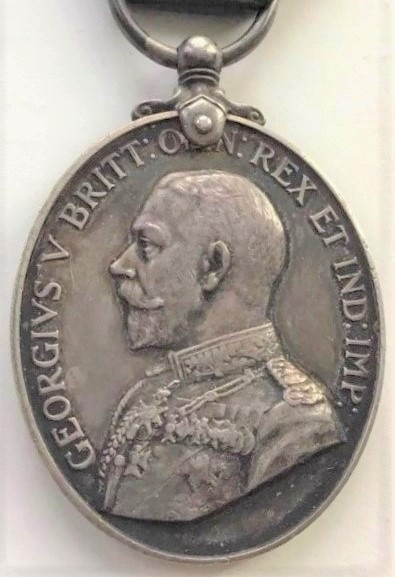
Obverse 1911-1930

== Award criteria ==
The medal was established in June 1908 by King Edward VII after, as part of the Haldane Reforms, the Special Reserve replaced the Militia, the new medal superseding the Militia Long Service Medal. It was awarded to privates and non-commissioned officers for 15 years efficient and irreproachable service in the Special Reserve and attending 15 annual trainings, although members of the two Irish Yeomanry regiments qualified with 10 years service and 10 annual trainings. Qualifying service for the medal could come from service in the Militia, Imperial Yeomanry, Volunteer Force, or Territorial Force, but not the Regular Army, as long as the last five years was in the Militia or Special Reserve. The medal was superseded by the Efficiency Medal in 1930.

No recipient could receive both this and the concurrently awarded Territorial Force Efficiency Medal.

Awards were published in Army Orders, with a total of 1,078 medals awarded: 428 bearing the effigy of King Edward VII and 650 with that of George V. In terms of unit, the following were conferred: Royal Artillery: 164; Royal Engineers: 9; Anglesey Royal Engineers: 3; Monmouthshire Regiment: 5; RAMC: 4; Labour Corps: 4; Machine Gun Corps: 1; North Irish Horse: 16; South Irish Horse: 30; King Edward's Horse: 14; Infantry: 823; Channel Islands (Jersey and Guernsey): 5.

== Appearance ==
The Special Reserve Long Service and Good Conduct Medal is a silver 32 millimetres (1.3 in) wide oval shaped medal of the following design:
The obverse depicts the bust of the reigning King in Field Marshal's uniform facing left. Originally Edward VII was shown, with the legend, EDWARDVS VII REX IMPERATOR. In 1911 the image was changed to that of George V, the legend reading GEORGIVS V BRITT: OMN: REX ET IND: IMP:.
The reverse bears the words SPECIAL RESERVE arched above FOR LONG SERVICE AND GOOD CONDUCT on four lines.
A claw suspension and ring suspender attaches the medal from a 32 mm wide dark blue ribbon with a centre stripe of light blue.
The recipient's service number, rank, name, and unit were impressed on the edge of the medal.
