= Territorial Efficiency Medal =

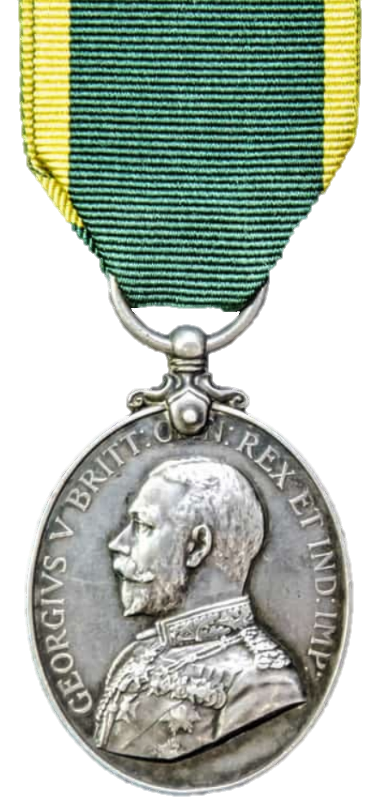
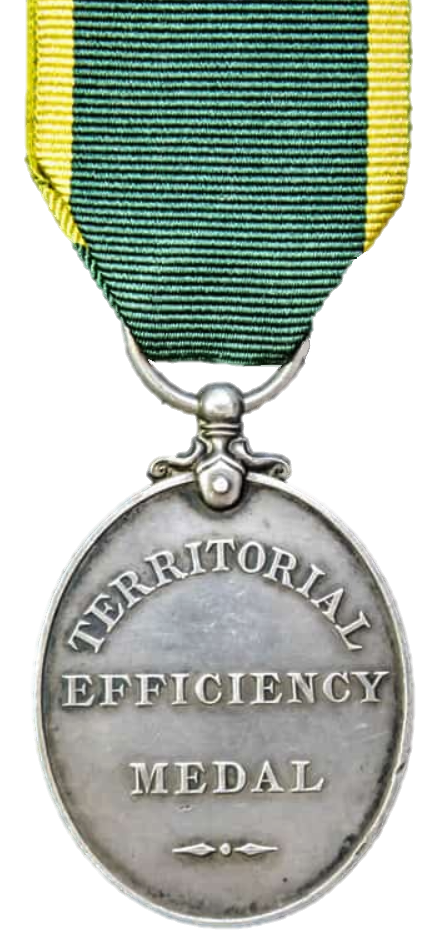
- Obverse and reverse of the medal
- Type: Long service medal
- Awarded for: A minimum of 12 years service, with war service counting double
- Description: Oval silver medal
- Presented by: The United Kingdom
- Eligibility: Territorial Army – other ranks
- Status: This award: Superseded the Territorial Force Efficiency Medal in 1921; Was superseded by the Efficiency Medal in 1930
- Established: 1921
- Regular and HAC ribbon bars

Precedence
- Next (higher): Efficiency Decoration
- Next (lower): Efficiency Medal

The Territorial Efficiency Medal (TEM) was a United Kingdom award for long service in the Territorial Army. It superseded the Territorial Force Efficiency Medal when the Territorial Force became the Territorial Army in 1921. It was superseded by the Efficiency Medal in 1930.

== Award criteria ==
The medal was awarded to non-commissioned officers and men for a minimum of 12 years service in the Territorial Army, providing they attended 12 annual training camps. Previous service in other part-time forces including the Territorial Force could count, while war service counted double. Clasps for further periods of 12 years service were intended but never issued, since the medal was superseded by the Efficiency Medal after 9 years.

The equivalent award for commissioned officers was the Territorial Decoration. A recipient could wear both awards together, provided they completed the full periods of qualifying service for each.

== Description ==
The Territorial Efficiency Medal is an oval silver medal, 38 millimetres (1.5 inches) high and 31 millimetres (1.2 inches) wide.
The obverse bears the effigy of King George V in Field Marshal's uniform facing left, circumscribed by the inscription "GEORGIVS V BRITT: OMN: REX ET IND: IMP:". The reverse has a raised rim and bears the inscription "TERRITORIAL EFFICIENCY MEDAL" on three lines.
The recipient's service number, rank, name, and unit were impressed on the edge of the medal.

The medal hangs from a ring suspension, attached to the medal by a claw fixing. The 32 millimetres (1.26 inches) wide ribbon is plain dark green with yellow edges.

=== Honourable Artillery Company ===
For members of the Honourable Artillery Company (HAC) the ribbon differed, being half blue, half scarlet with yellow edges, reflecting the racing colours of King Edward VII. This distinction was bestowed by Edward VII for the Volunteer Long Service And Good Conduct Medal and the honour was extended to long service medals under the Territorial designations.
