= Volunteer Long Service Medal =

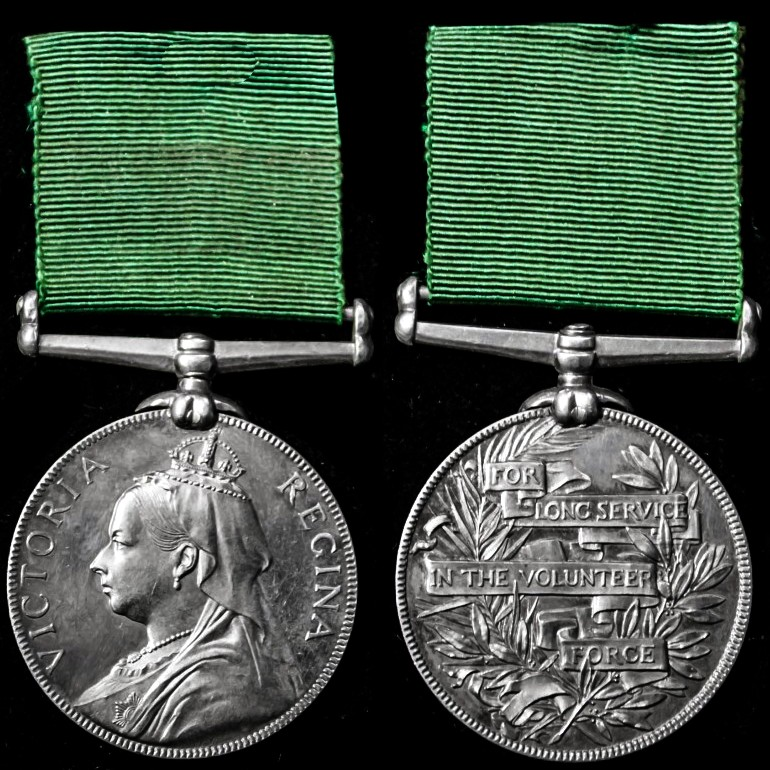
- Queen Victoria version
- Type: Military long service medal
- Awarded for: Twenty years service
- Country: United Kingdom
- Presented by: the Monarch of the United Kingdom of Great Britain and Ireland, and Empress of India
- Eligibility: Other ranks and Officers who have served in the ranks of the Volunteer Force
- Status: Discontinued in 1908
- Established: 1894
- First award: 1894
- Final award: 1908

Highlights
- Total: 45,000
- Regular & Honourable Artillery Company ribbon bars

Order of Wear
- Next (higher): Volunteer Officers' Decoration
- Next (lower): Volunteer Officers' Decoration for India and the Colonies
- Related: Volunteer Long Service Medal for India and the Colonies

The Volunteer Long Service Medal was instituted in 1894 as an award for long service by other ranks and some officers of the United Kingdom's Volunteer Force. Award of the medal was discontinued when it was superseded by the Territorial Force Efficiency Medal in 1908.

The grant of the medal was extended in 1896 by the institution of a separate new medal, the Volunteer Long Service Medal for India and the Colonies, that could be awarded to other ranks of all Volunteer Forces throughout the British Empire and India.

== Institution ==
More than sixty years after a medal for long service was introduced for the Regular Army upon the institution of the Army Long Service and Good Conduct Medal in 1830, the first such awards were instituted for the part-time Volunteer Force.

The Volunteer Long Service Medal was established by Queen Victoria in 1894 and its regulations were published in Special Army Order no. 85 of June 1894, as amended. The medal could be awarded to other ranks in the part-time Volunteer Force of the United Kingdom, as well as to officers who had served in the ranks but who had not qualified for the award of the Volunteer Officers' Decoration.

== Award criteria ==
The qualifying period of service was twenty years and the medal could be awarded upon the recommendation by an individual's present or, if retired, former commanding officer. Service had to have been consecutive, with allowance being made for special circumstances. Officer recipients who were subsequently awarded the Volunteer Officers' Decoration would have to surrender the medal.

== Colonial version ==
On 13 June 1896 the grant of the Volunteer Long Service Medal was extended by Queen Victoria to members of Volunteer Forces throughout the British Empire, defined as being India, the Dominion of Canada, the Crown Colonies and the British Protectorates. A separate new medal was instituted, the Volunteer Long Service Medal for India and the Colonies. Institution of this medal was not, as usual, by Royal Warrant but in terms of a special Army Order. This medal was similar in design to the Volunteer Long Service Medal, but bore different inscriptions on the obverse of each monarch's version to include India, the Dominion, the Colonies and the Protectorates as subjects of the reigning monarch.

== Order of wear ==
In the order of wear prescribed by the British Central Chancery of the Orders of Knighthood, the Volunteer Long Service Medal takes precedence after the Volunteer Officers' Decoration and before the Volunteer Officers' Decoration for India and the Colonies.

== Description ==
The Volunteer Long Service Medal was struck in silver and is a disc, 1.45 inches (37 millimetres) in diameter, with a raised rim on each side. It is suspended from a straight swivelling silver bar, affixed to the medal by means of a claw and a pin through the upper edge of the medal.

Obverse

The obverse of the medal depicts the reigning monarch. Two versions of the Volunteer Long Service Medal were struck.

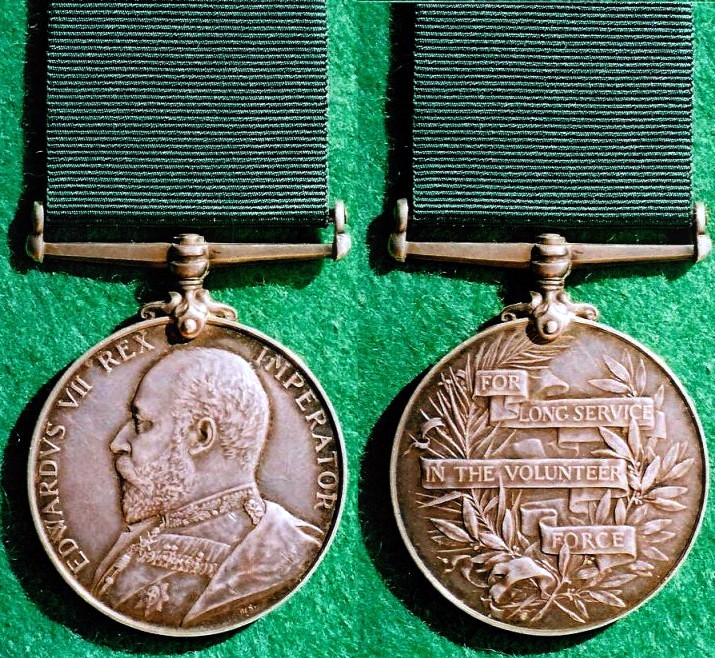
King Edward VII version

- The original version of 1894, created by George William de Saulles, shows the effigy of Queen Victoria wearing the Crown, a veil and the Star of the Order of the Garter. The effigy is circumscribed "VICTORIA REGINA". This version's suspender is affixed to the medal by means of a double-toe claw. Some Queen Victoria versions of the medal were awarded up to the Army Order of July 1902, post-dating her death.
- The King Edward VII version, introduced after his succession to the throne in 1901, displays his effigy in Field Marshal's uniform and is circumscribed "EDWARDVS VII REX IMPERATOR". This version's suspender is affixed to the medal by means of a single-toe claw.

Reverse

The reverse shows a palm and laurel wreath that supports a scrolled banner bearing the inscription "FOR LONG SERVICE IN THE VOLUNTEER FORCE" in four lines.

Ribbons

The medal's regular ribbon is plain dark green and 1 1/4 inches (32 millimetres) wide.

An administrative oversight resulted in members of the Honourable Artillery Company, reckoned as the oldest regiment of the Royal Army, not being made eligible for the Volunteer Long Service Medal until 1906. To compensate the venerable regiment for this omission, the medal was awarded to its members with a special ribbon to distinguish it from regular awards. This ribbon is dark blue and red, 1 1/4 inches (32 millimetres) wide and edged with 2½ millimetres wide yellow bands, the household colours of King Edward VII. This special honour was extended in respect of the medal's successors and subsequent incarnations to the present day.

== Recipients ==
More than 45,000 Volunteer Long Service Medals were awarded in the United Kingdom.

== Discontinuation ==
The Volunteer Force was the precursor of the Territorial Force, which was established in the United Kingdom in 1908. At the same time, the award of the Volunteer Long Service Medal was discontinued and superseded by the new Territorial Force Efficiency Medal.
